= William Mariner =

William Mariner may refer to:

- William Mariner (VC) (1882–1916), English recipient of the Victoria Cross during the First World War
- William Mariner (writer) (1791–1853), Englishman who wrote of his experiences in the Polynesian island kingdom of Tonga
