= Yarrow Bridge =

Bridge in Lancashire, England

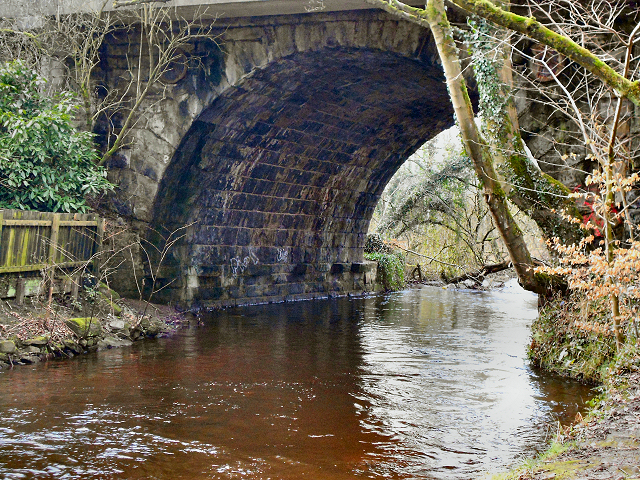
- Coordinates: 53.641°N 2.619°W
- Carries: A6 road
- Crosses: River Yarrow
- Locale: Chorley, Lancashire, England

History
- Opened: 17th century

Location
- Interactive map of Yarrow Bridge

Yarrow Bridge is a small road bridge which crosses the River Yarrow in Chorley, Lancashire, England. The bridge carries the A6 road over the river. There is also a pub and garage next door to bridge which carries the same name.

The bridge has existed since the late 17th century when the road leading to Bolton (A6) was put east away from Duxbury Woods. Before this a previous road bridge existed with its foundations still remaining within the woodland.

A spa was also established behind the bridge on Hoggs Lane in the 1850s; so much was the popularity of the spa was that over 10,000 people attended the spa on one day in remarkably hot summer of 1850. The small cottage which exists in the shadow of the bridge is the only remnant of the spa's existence.

The public house which is adjacent and carries the bridge's name is one of the oldest in Chorley. The establishment was previously known as the Standish Arms after the local manor lords of Duxbury Hall and carries local historical significance as it was believed to be the staging point for local constables from Preston during the Battle of Duxbury Hall in 1813.

The bridge is also at the point were the River Yarrow and the Black Brook meet; a smaller adjacent bridge carries Hoggs Lane over the Black Brook.
