= Spitlers Edge =

- Location within the Borough of Chorley

Highest point
- Elevation: 392 m (1,286 ft)
- Prominence: 70 m (230 ft)
- Coordinates: 53°39′07″N 2°31′31″W

Geography
- Location: Anglezarke Moor, Chorley, Lancashire, England
- Parent range: West Pennine Moors

Spitlers Edge is a ridge running along the eastern edge of Anglezarke Moor, Chorley, Lancashire, England from Standing Stones Hill to Hordern Stoops. The peak, complete with a cairn at 1,286 feet (392 m), is the high point of the moorland. Redmonds Edge links Spitlers Edge to Great Hill and is paved. As of 2017, there are plans to extend the paving along the length of Spitlers Edge - with funding secured from the Lancashire Environmental Fund and United Utilities.

Along the length of the edge is a stone wall of some historical importance - the boundary was built in 1841 as a relief measure to provide respite from the Hungry Forties, and is the parliamentary division boundary between Chorley and Blackburn. The name is derived from the fact that in mediaeval times, the Knights Hospitallers of St. John of Jerusalem used this route when travelling to their holdings in this district. The ridge provides the peaks that supply the source water to the River Yarrow.
