= River Yarrow (Lancashire) =

River in Lancashire, England

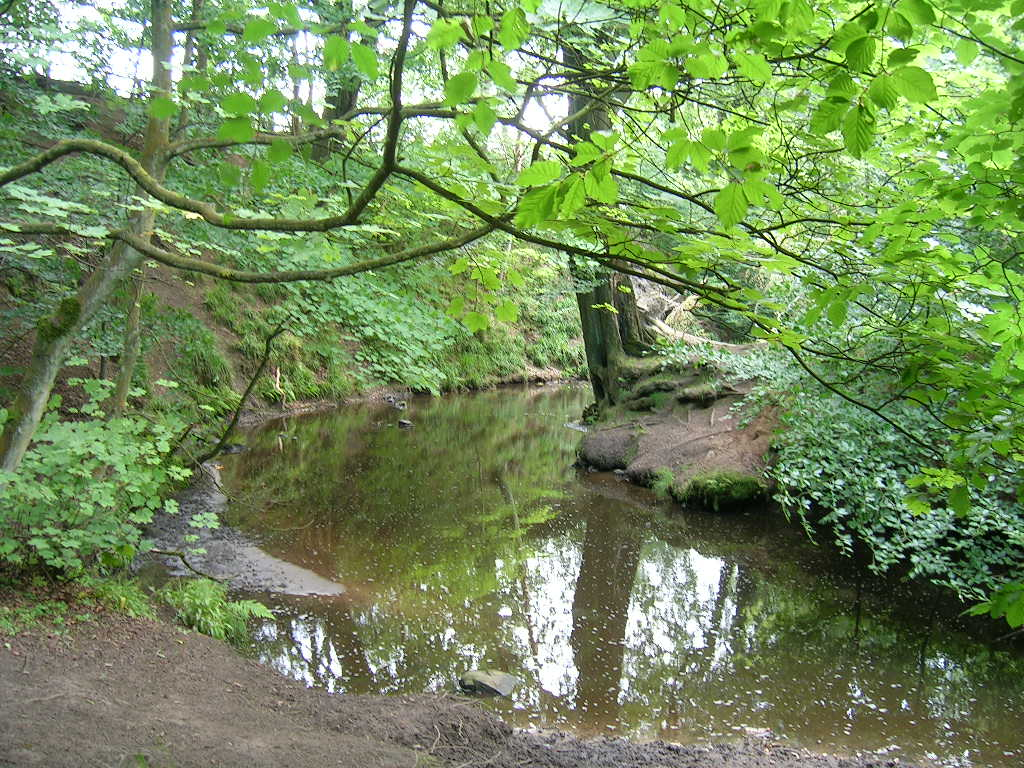
- River Yarrow in Duxbury Woods

Location
- Country: England
- Region: North West England

Physical characteristics
- Source: Will Narr
  - location: Anglezarke Moor
  - coordinates: 53°38′20.87″N 2°31′26.04″W
  - elevation: 325 m (1,066 ft)
- Mouth: River Douglas
  - location: Sollom
  - coordinates: 53°39′41.46″N 2°48′32.7″W
  - elevation: 5 m (16 ft)

Basin features
- Tributaries
  - left: see article

The River Yarrow is in Lancashire, with its source at an area called Will Narr at Hordern Stoops, along Spitlers Edge - the Chorley/Blackburn boundary - on the West Pennine Moors. The river feeds the Yarrow Reservoir, which in turn feeds the Anglezarke and Upper and Lower Rivington Reservoirs. Upon leaving the reservoirs via a pumping station, the river passes through an area that was formerly known as Abyssinia. Currently, this area is within the boundaries of Heath Charnock and Limbrick, but the original name was given because it was a route frequented by coal miners, and the workers were said to look like natives of Abyssinia (modern day Ethiopia): until the mid 20th century it was usual for miners to return from work covered in coal dust.

From here, the river flows underneath the Leeds and Liverpool Canal, joining Black Brook at Yarrow Bridge, then continuing through the ancient woodland of Duxbury into Yarrow Valley Park forming a boundary of Euxton and on through Eccleston and Croston, where it feeds the River Douglas at Sollom just before its inlet into the River Ribble's brackish final stretch. The entire course of the River Yarrow falls within Chorley and its villages. Parts of the river are a County Biological Heritage Site.

== Croston Flood Risk Management Scheme ==
The Croston Flood Risk Management Scheme involved the construction of a dam on the River just east of Eccleston. The dam was constructed to protect over 300 properties in Croston and Eccleston from flooding. The dam was proposed after the 2012 floods which flooded over 200 properties in Croston. Construction had already commenced when the 2015 boxing day floods caused over 300 properties in Croston and Eccleston to flood. This consequently meant that the construction suffered a major delay due to unworkable ground conditions as a result of the floods. The dam was finally completed in July 2017 at a cost of £7 million, £5.4 million in Government Grant in Aid funding, £1 million from Chorley Council, £181,000 from Lancashire County Council and £667,000 was received from local levy. The dam works by monitoring the river level in croston and either lowers or raises gates to control the flow of water. A Large bank was constructed to hold excess water back. The scheme has so far proved successful at protecting Croston and Eccleston from flooding.

== Etymology ==
The name Yarrow is obscure, and there are multiple explanations as to the origin of the name. It may have the same origin as the River Yarrow in Selkirkshire in Scotland, and therefore be derived from the Brittonic element garw, meaning "rough, harsh, rugged, uncultivated". However, it may also be related to the River Arrow in Warwickshire (Brittonic *ar-w-ā-), and derived either from Brittonic *ar, an ancient river-name element implying either horizontal motion, "flowing", or else "rising" or "springing up", or *arβ, *arw, found in the Celtic languages as Welsh irfin and Breton irvin, both meaning "a wild turnip". A relationship with the River Arrow in the Welsh Marches is also possible, deriving therefore from a form of Brittonic arɣant, meaning "silver, white, bright".

== Wildlife ==
After suffering many years of pollution due to effluent discharge from Whitter's factory and Stanley's factory, the river is now much cleaner, and as such has attracted birds such as dippers, grey wagtails and kingfishers, and fish including trout, chub, Dace and barbel.

Fish passes have been installed at Pincock, Birkacre and Duxbury, to enable upstream spawning of fish which would be unable to navigate the weirs. Salmon have been recorded at Duxbury for the first time in over 100 years.

Removal of Himalayan Balsam, Japanese Knotweed and Rhododendron plants is undertaken to allow low-growing native species to flourish.

== Tributaries ==
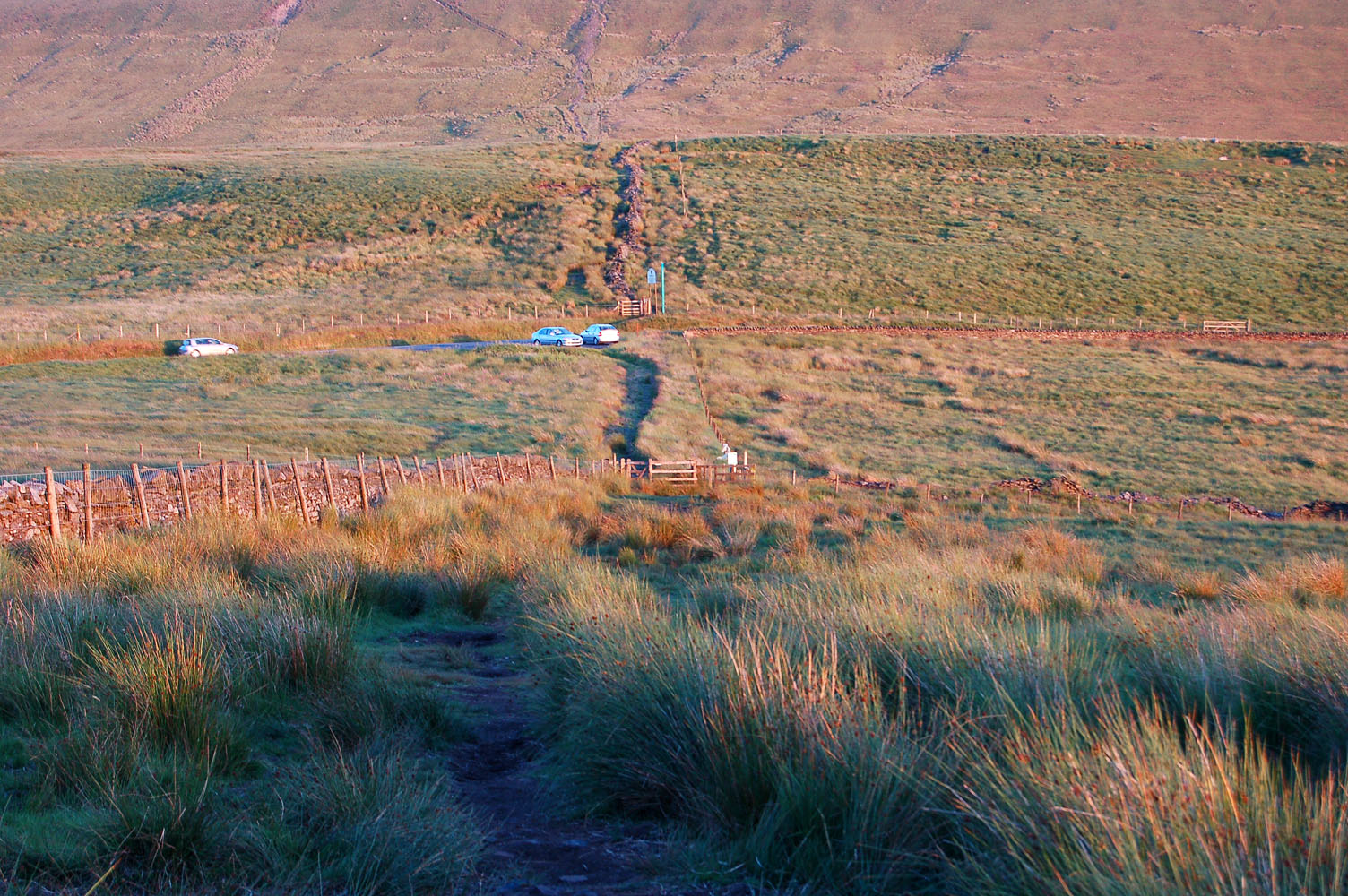
The source of the river at the base of Will Narr, Hordern Stoops, Lancashire. At the top of the picture are the slopes of Winter Hill

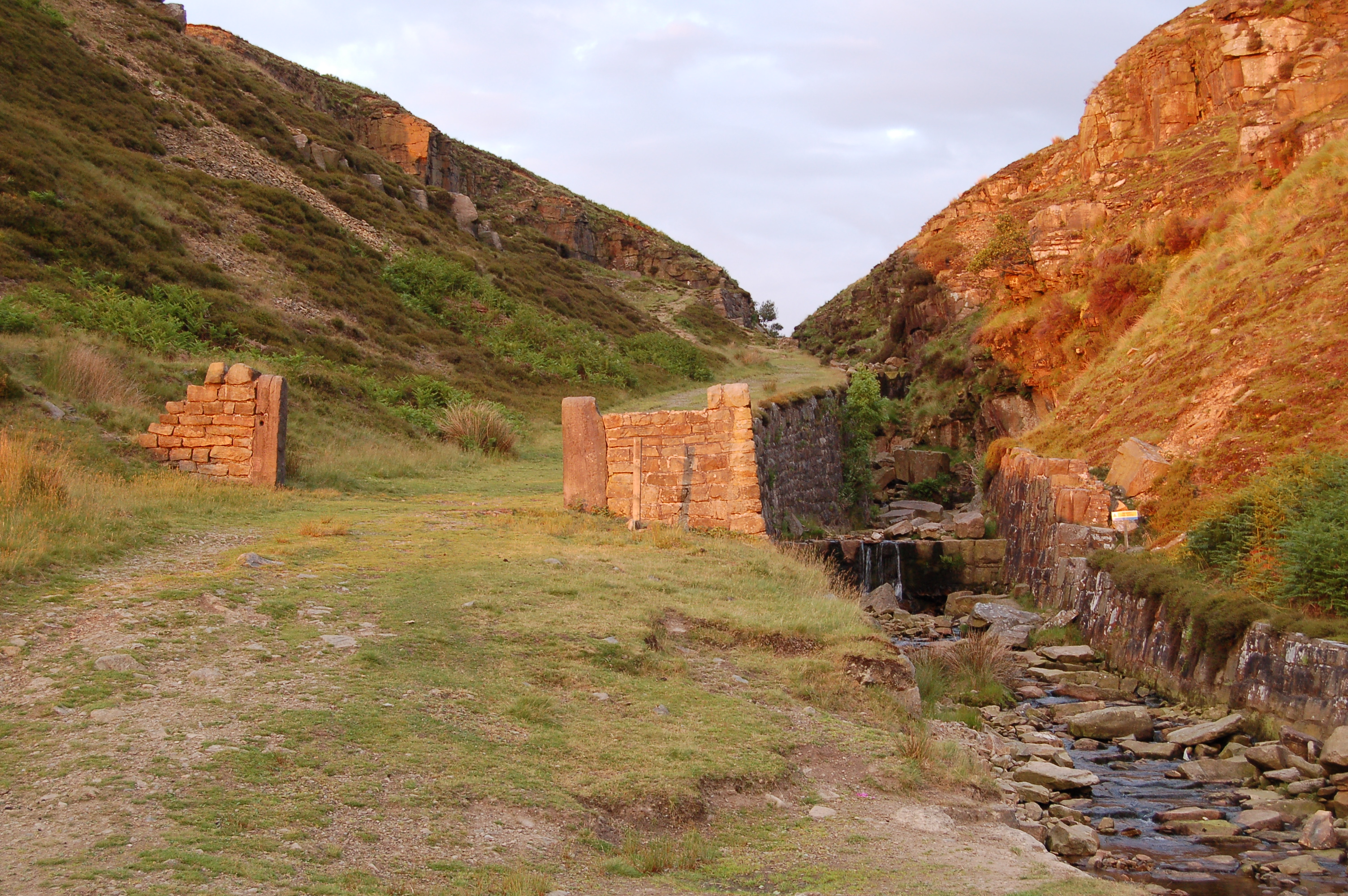
Black Brook - a tributary at White Coppice

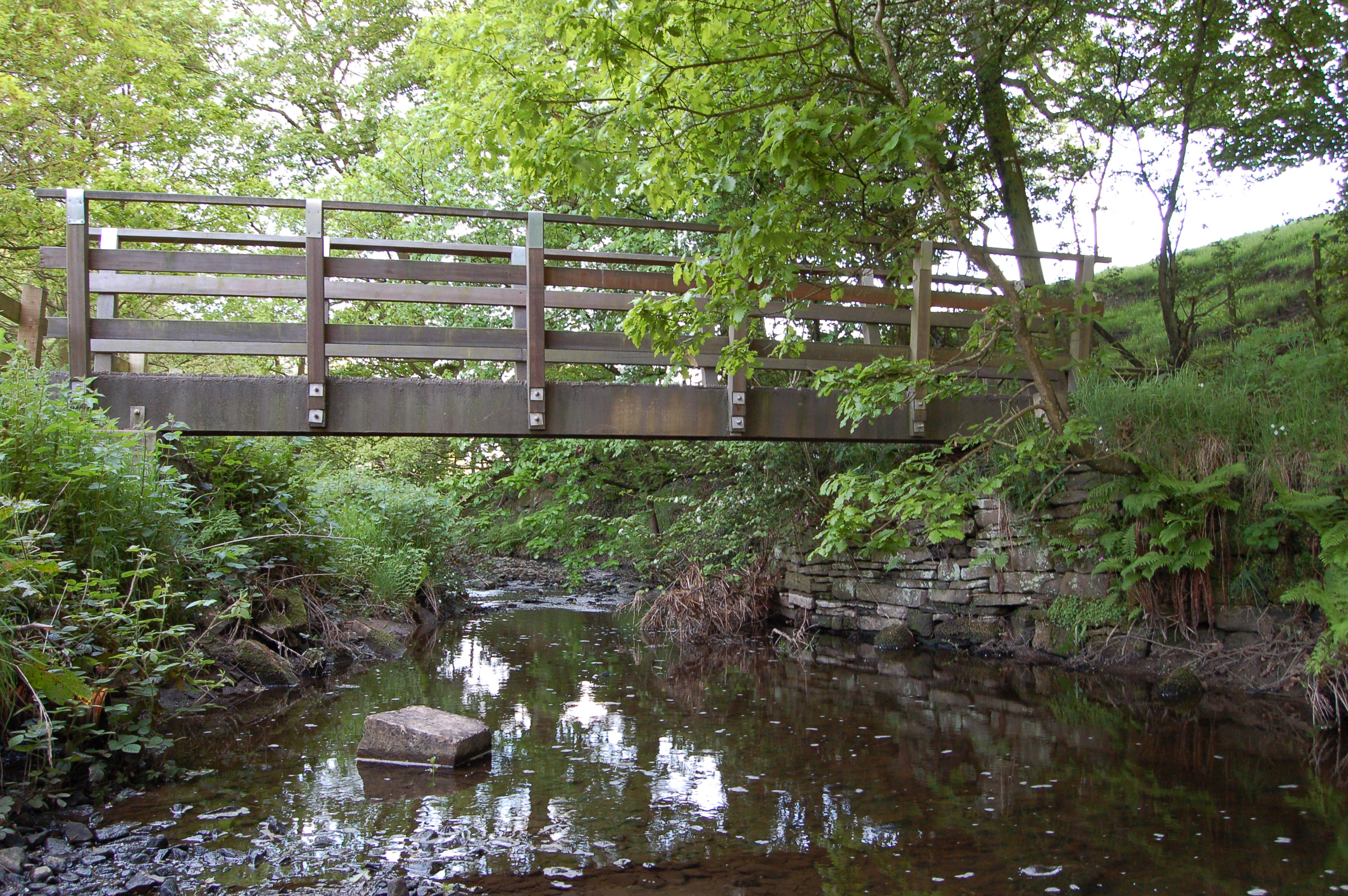
Shortly after departing the reservoirs, the river passes through an area of Chorley formerly known as Abyssinia

Locations that are listed on Ordnance Survey maps are italicised:

Green Withins Brook — near to the ruins of Simm's Farm. It starts at Standing Stones Hill.

Limestone Brook — has its source near to Devils Ditch, and flows via Shooting Huts on Anglezarke Moor where it joins at the Meeting of the Waters.

Black Brook — flows from Great Hill through White Coppice (where it is known as Warth Brook), and lesserly from Eagle Tower at Heapey. The brook joins the river at the Yarrow Bridge prior to entering Duxbury Woods. The brook has today more flow than the Yarrow, due to the large amount of water removed from the Yarrow for consumption. In fact, the Yarrow flooded when Anglezarke Reservoir was drained in 2002, waterlogging the fields at Nick Hilton's Bridge.

Eller Brook — partial offtake, between Duxbury Woods and Drybones (off Burgh Lane) from Adlington

Clancutt Brook — flows away from the sea, and feeds in at Birkacre near Coppull.

River Chor — at the Common Bank area of Chorley, near to Euxton.

German Brook — shortly after.

Culbeck Brook — at Euxton.

Syd Brook — at Croston.

River Lostock — at Bretherton near its confluence with the Douglas.

== Tributaries continued ==
  - River Lostock
    - Wymott Brook
    - Clayton Brook
    - Slack Brook
    - Whave's Brook
  - Spent Brook
  - Syd Brook
    - Howe Brook
    - Pye Brook
  - Culbeck Brook
    - Chapel Brook
      - Ransnap Brook
      - German Brook
  - Hodge Brook
  - River Chor
  - Clancutt Brook
    - Tanyard Brook
    - Whittle Brook
  - Eller Brook
    - Moss Ditch
  - Black Brook
    - Tan House Brook
    - Warth Brook
      - Brinscall Brook
      - Fill Brook
  - Roaring Lum
  - Dean Brook
    - Hall Brook
    - Cote Slack
  - Limestone Brook
  - Green Withins Brook
- The Sluice
  - Mill
  - Old Reed Brook

== Water quality ==
The Environment Agency measure the water quality of the river systems in England. Each is given an overall ecological status, which may be one of five levels: high, good, moderate, poor and bad. There are several components that are used to determine this, including biological status, which looks at the quantity and varieties of invertebrates, angiosperms and fish, and chemical status, which compares the concentrations of various chemicals against known safe concentrations. Chemical status is rated good or fail.

The water quality of the River Yarrow system was as follows in 2016. Reasons for the quality being less than good include sewage discharge, physical modification of the channel and poor nutrient management of agricultural land.

Section	Ecological Status	Chemical Status	Overall Status	Length	Catchment	Channel
Yarrow US Big Lodge Water	Moderate	Good	Moderate	13.2 miles (21.2 km)	14.45 square miles (37.4 km^{2})	heavily modified
Yarrow DS Big Lodge Water	Moderate	Good	Moderate	11.7 miles (18.8 km)	8.59 square miles (22.2 km^{2})	heavily modified
Syd Brook	Moderate	Good	Moderate	5.6 miles (9.0 km)	6.58 square miles (17.0 km^{2})	heavily modified
Lostock DS Farington Weir	Moderate	Good	Moderate	13.9 miles (22.4 km)	15.52 square miles (40.2 km^{2})	heavily modified
Yarrow Culbeck Brook to tidal	Moderate	Good	Moderate	8.3 miles (13.4 km)	4.34 square miles (11.2 km^{2})	heavily modified
