= Healey Nab =

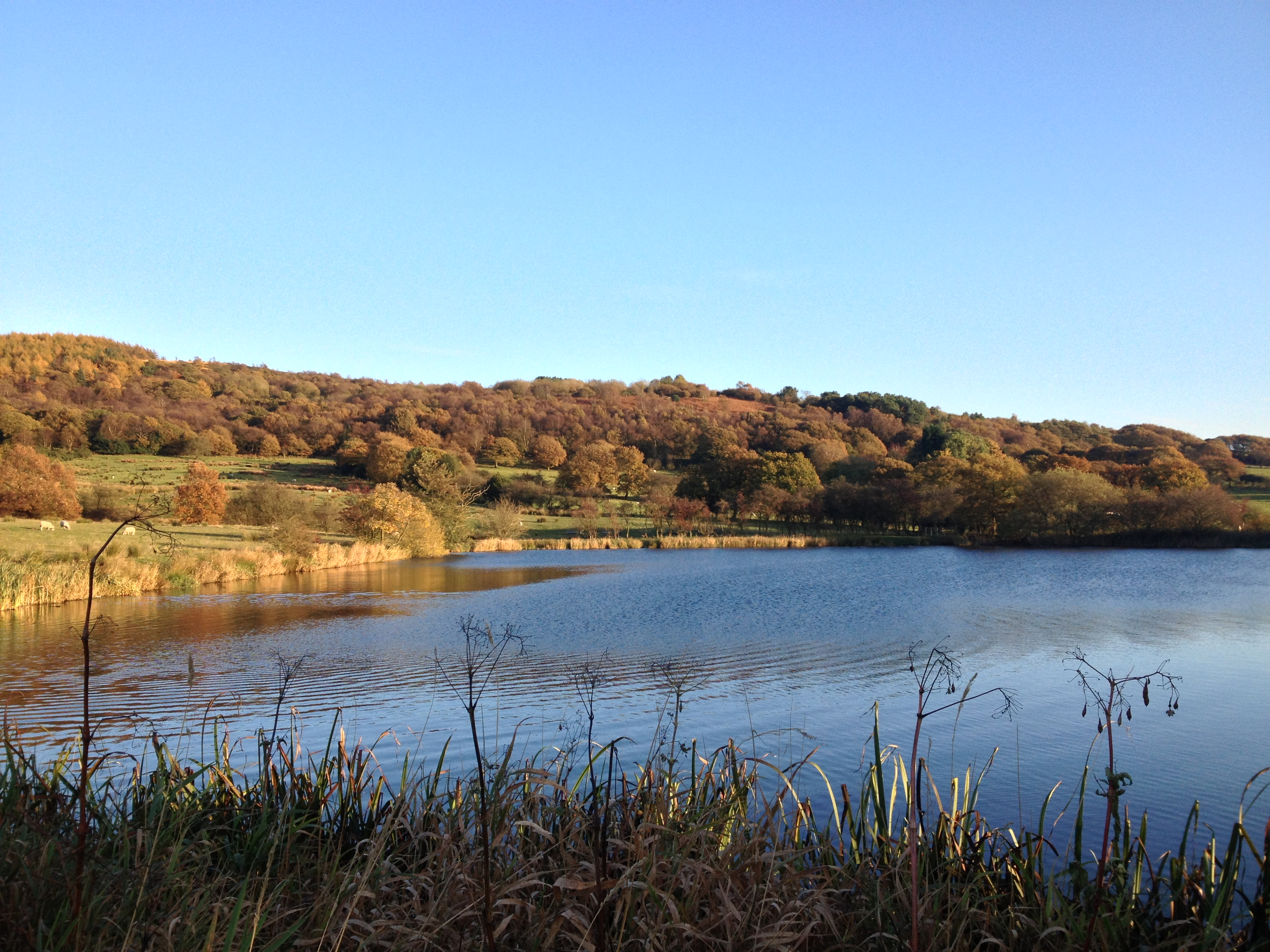

Highest point
- Elevation: 208 m (682 ft)
- Prominence: 64 m (210 ft)
- Coordinates: 53.6568°N 2.5953°W

Geography
- Location within Lancashire Location within the Borough of Chorley
- Location: Lancashire, England
- Parent range: West Pennine Moors
- OS grid: SD607179
- Topo map: OS Landranger 109

Healey Nab or "The Nab" is an area of countryside owned partly by Lancashire County Council containing rolling hills, moorland, woodland, ponds and streams to the east of Chorley, Lancashire, between the M61 and the West Pennine Moors. To its southeast is Anglezarke Reservoir and to its northeast is White Coppice.

The name "Healey Nab" is derived from heagh (high) and ley (woodland). "Nab" is believed to derive from the Middle-English nabb, meaning promontory or headland.

The area is popular with walkers; a network of hiking trails criss-crosses it. It has two small human-made lakes: Bottom Lodge, and Top Lodge, a private fishing lake. They used to be linked to Lower Healey Bleach Works, a finishing works of the town's cotton industry, whose remaining structure has been incorporated into the site's conversion into a small industrial estate. The summit is Grey Heights, and near it is a disused quarry known as Devil's Rock. Its highest point is Grey Heights, at 682 feet, with views of Chorley, the skyline of Preston, Fiddlers Ferry power station in Merseyside, Jodrell Bank Telescope, and the silhouette of Blackpool Tower, Blackpool Pleasure Beach and the Irish Sea. From Chorley, "The Nab" dominates the landscape and is the first significant height gain in the transition from a heavily populated area to the moorland of the West Pennine Moors.

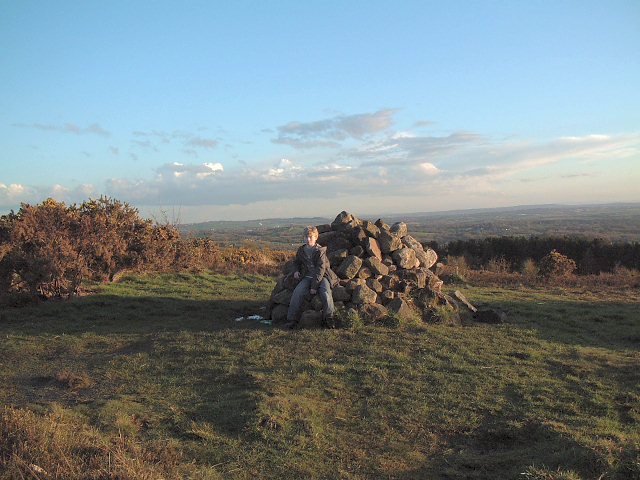
The Summit of Healey Nab, showing The Cairn
