= Porter Lancastrian =

British point-of-sale equipment manufacturer

Porter Lancastrian Limited is a British manufacturer of point-of-sale dispense equipment for the brewing industry. The company sells its products under the Porta brand. It is also a fully accredited certified ISO 9001:2015 company.

The company is located in the town of Chorley and was established in 1936.
