= River Chor =

River in Lancashire, England

Coordinates: 53.6469°N 2.6559°W

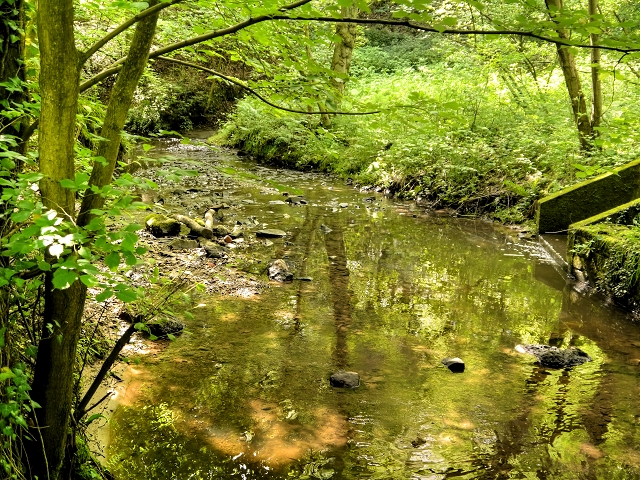
River Chor near Chorley

The River Chor is a largely culverted stream in the Lancashire town of Chorley. Its name was back-formed from "Chorley".

The source of the river is in the hills near Heapey.

Subsequently, the young stream flows through Chorley North Industrial Estate, past B&Q and then underground to enter Astley Park from under Park Road.

The river exits at the Southport Road end of the park, flowing behind Chorley Nissan and through Big Wood at the foot of Stansted Road, before connecting into Gillibrand Reservoir.

At the end of the reservoir, the river continues for approximately one hundred metres and flows into the River Yarrow.
