= Yarrow Valley Country Park =

Country park in Lancashire, England

Coordinates: 53.632°N 2.636°W

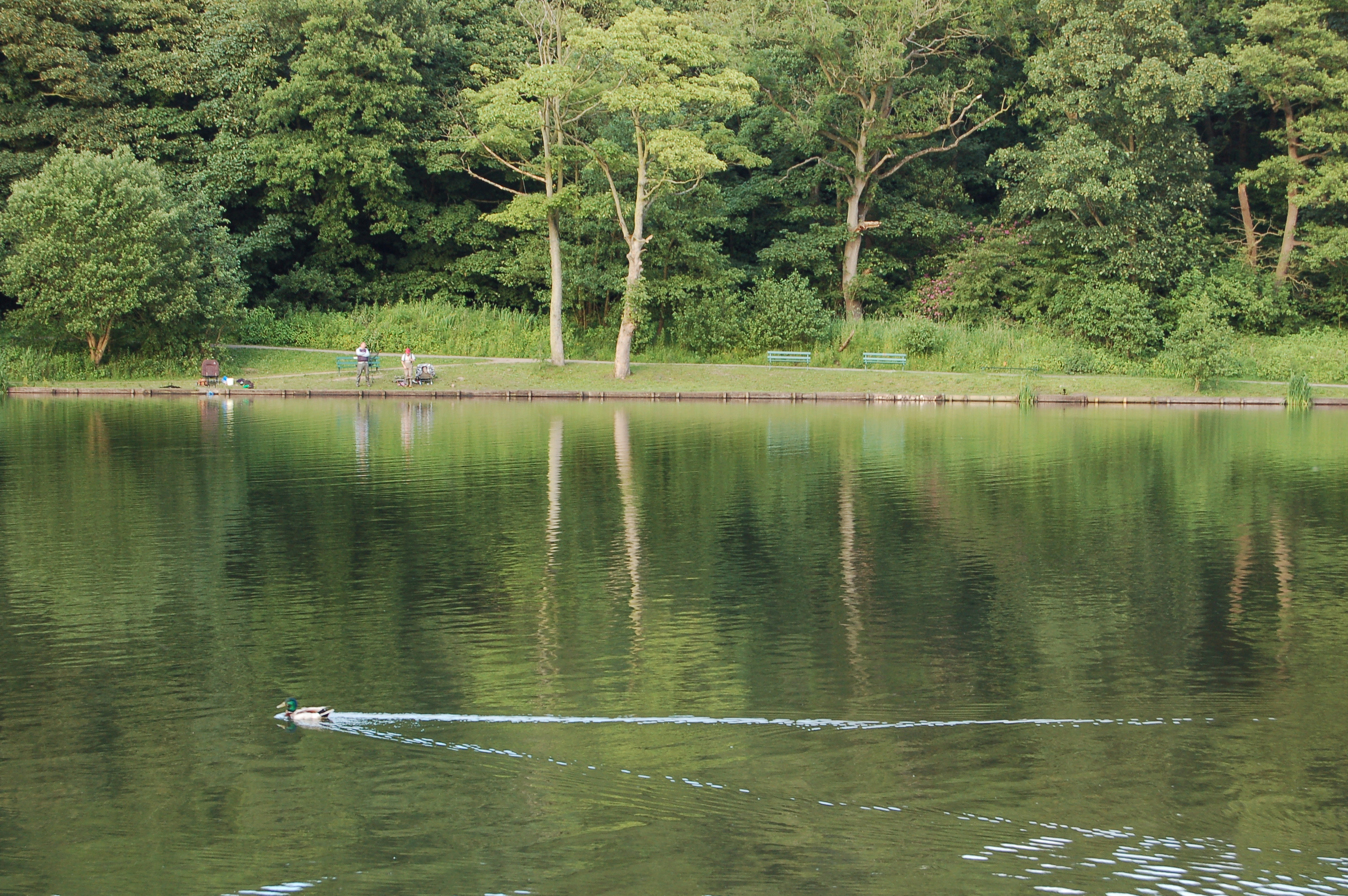
Looking across the "Big Lodge"

Yarrow Valley Country Park is a country park managed by Chorley Borough Council in Lancashire, England. It follows the River Yarrow for about 6 miles (9.7 km). It contains much woodland and includes nature reserves, the best known being Birkacre and Duxbury Woods. Parts of the park are reclaimed collieries and other old industrial sites.

A visitors' centre is on site, with regular conservation events. Angling is permitted on the two lodges.

The park provides recreation for the nearby town of Chorley and its surrounding villages. The Council notes that access points have been improved in recent years.
