= Jack Nelson (footballer) =

English footballer (1906–1986)

Personal information
- Full name: John Henry Nelson
- Date of birth: 15 March 1906
- Place of birth: Chorley, England
- Date of death: 1986 (aged 79–80)
- Height: 6 ft 1 1/2 in (1.87 m)
- Position: Defender

Senior career*
Years	Team	Apps	(Gls)
1925–1926	Chorley All Saints		
1926–1927	Chorley		
1928–1932	Preston North End	71	(2)
1932–1935	Wolverhampton Wanderers	74	(4)
1935–1939	Luton Town	134	(1)
Total		279	(7)
- * Club domestic league appearances and goals

John Henry Nelson (15 March 1906 – 1986) was an English footballer who played in the Football League for Luton Town, Preston North End and Wolverhampton Wanderers.
