= Duxbury Woods =

Woodland in Chorley, Lancashire, England

Coordinates: 53.633°N 2.624°W

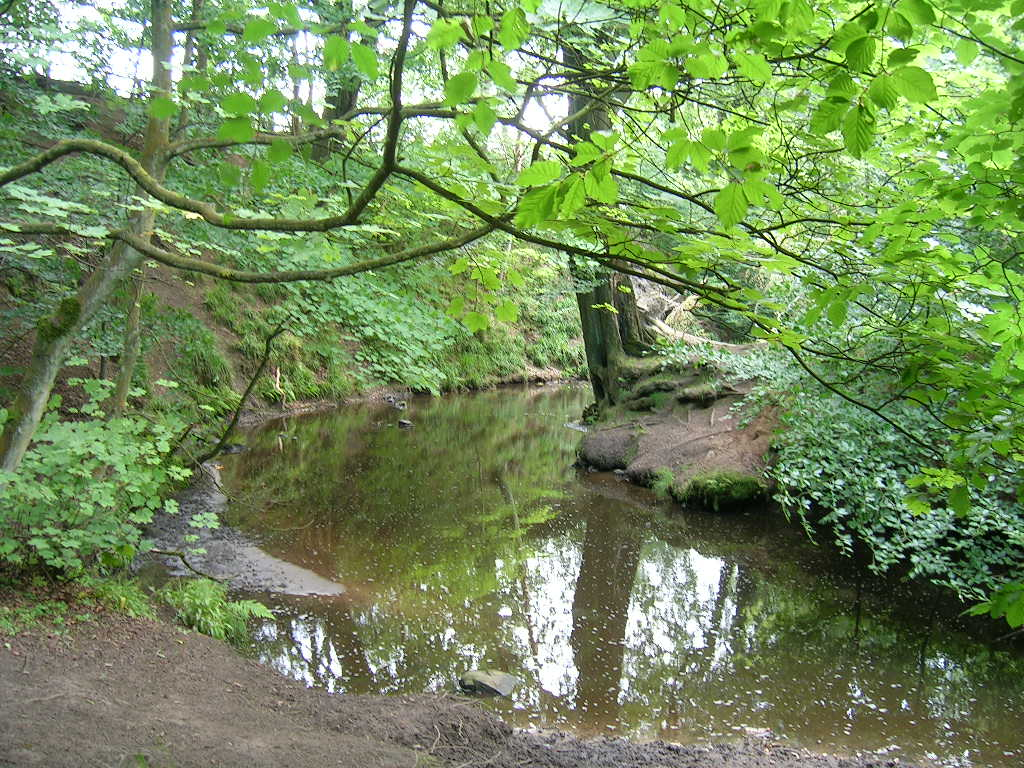
The River Yarrow in Duxbury Woods

Duxbury Woods is an area of woodland and parkland situated in Chorley, Lancashire, at the foot of the West Pennine Moors. The area originally existed as a township with the council meeting at the Yarrow Bridge pub; this was absorbed into Chorley Rural District in the early 20th century.

Duxbury today is home to Duxbury Jubilee Park, Duxbury Golf Course, the woods and the River Yarrow. It was also home to Duxbury Hall, the seat of the Standish family. The estate and grounds still exist with the gardens, stables, coachhouse, 16th century barn and Lodges on Bolton Road and Wigan Lane remaining. The Hall itself was built in the 17th century, and was demolished to make way for housing in 1957. Many consider the great barn (which remains) to be the original home of the pilgrim father Myles Standish.

Duxbury, Massachusetts was named after this area.

== History ==
Duxbury has existed with this name (Deuksburie, Dokesbirie, etc.) since an Angle named Deowuc settled there in 600-900 AD, before the arrival of Vikings at the latter date. He is believed during the rule of King Offa to have set up a fortified farm known as a burh on land near the present day Saw Mills on Wigan Lane.

The first Old Hall was in the south of Duxbury (many believe on the site of Bretters Farm near to the Leeds-Liverpool Canal) and the Elizabethan Hall in the centre of the manor was built c. 1600 (many think this was the home of Myles Standish).

Other buildings include game preserves, stables and coachhouses. A peel tower was constructed in the north of Duxbury during the Scottish Wars of Independence where in 1322, Chorley was raided by the Scots. The peel tower was thought to have been built soon afterwards, although documents suggest that it was prior to 1319. The rectangular hall pictured was first built in the 17th century, with many later modifications, but was demolished in the 1950s. The site of the manor is now home of Duxbury Jubilee Golf Course. The Great Hall (known as the barn) is now home of Dodd architects and the stables and coachhouses are home to Glendale Managed services. A conservatory and various other buildings within the manor wall were built for Chorley Rural Council but are now used as staff blocks for the Golf course staff.

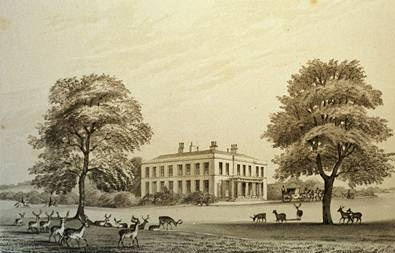
Duxbury Hall as it looked in 1840

The woodland was home to Duxbury Mill which ground corn. Today only traces can be found deep into the woodland at the edge of Red Bank Lane off Carr Lane on the grounds of the Vertex Centre. The weir and mill race which powered the mill still exist and can be seen from the Yarrow Bridge. As well as the mill four coal mines existed; Duxbury Park, Duxbury, Carr and Yarrow Collieries existed. Duxbury Park's old railway bridge ruins can still be seen on Wigan lane. This means there are many tunnels underneath Duxbury with many now disappeared. The latter three collieries were all located around the grounds of the Marconi factory and Vertex Centre whilst Duxbury Park was located near to Wigan Lane.

Some of Duxbury is now part of the Yarrow Valley Park which also includes the nearby Birkacre lodges and the large Burgh estate which was once owned by Duxbury Hall.

Today the parkland is home to the Chorley Red Bank Scout Group, who meet at the (St Georges) Red Bank Mission. This building was formerly used to serve the workers of the collieries of Carr Lane.
