= Chorley Theatre =

Community theatre in Wigan, England

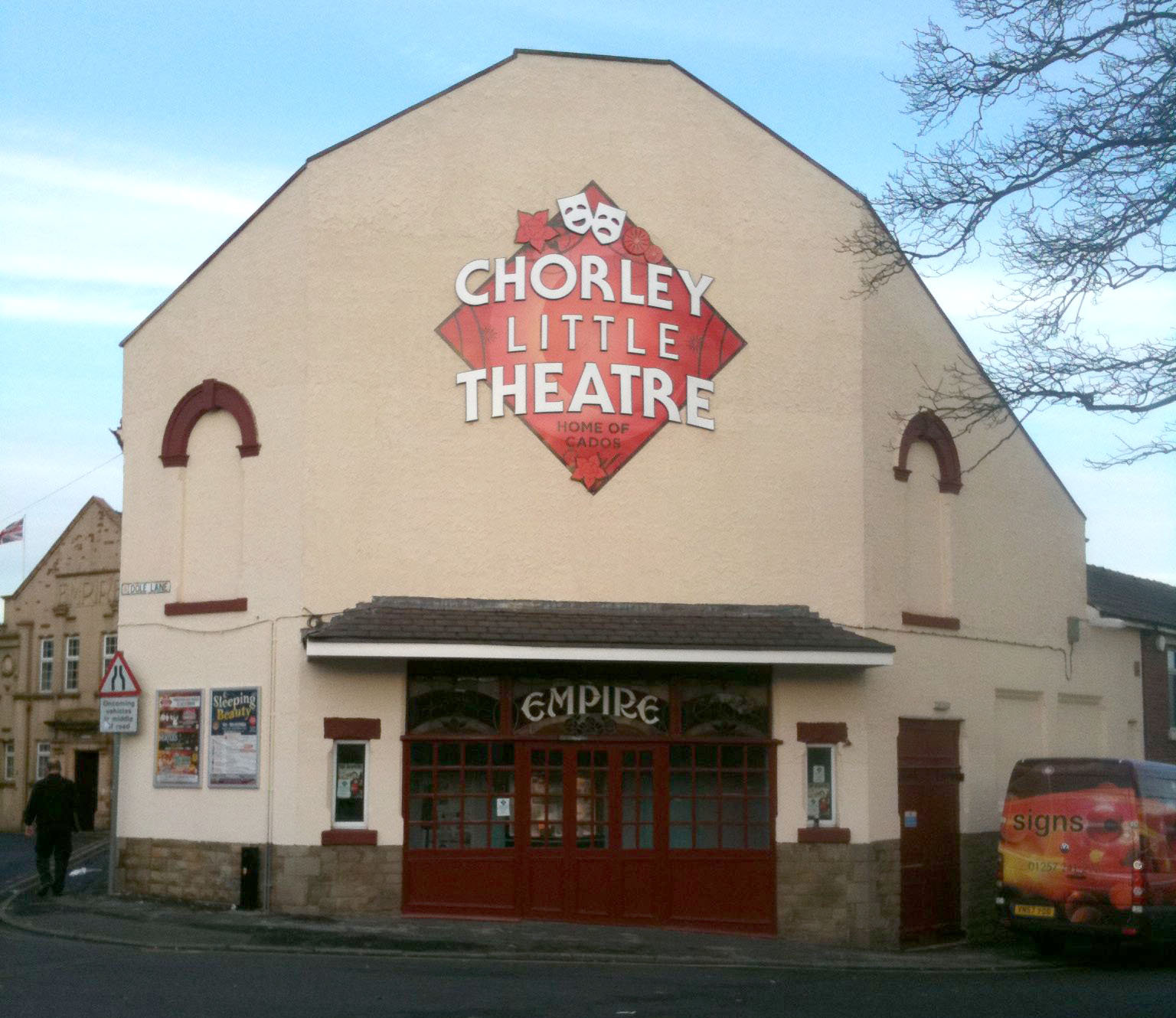
- Entrance to Chorley Theatre
- Interactive map of Chorley Theatre
- Address: Dole Ln, Chorley PR7 2RL; Chorley; UK
- Coordinates: 53°39′11″N 2°38′03″W
- Capacity: 234

Construction
- Opened: 1910

Website
- chorleytheatre.com

Chorley Theatre is a volunteer-run community theatre in Chorley, Lancashire, England. It stages theatre, film, comedy, music and community arts, and is one of the oldest purpose-built cinemas still operating in the UK. The venue is operated by Chorley Amateur Dramatic and Operatic Society (CADOS), which stages a wide range of productions throughout the year, including drama, comedy, pantomime, and youth theatre performances. CADOS typically presents six major shows per season. The theatre is also home to the Chorley Youth Theatre, which meets every Saturday. Originally built as a cinema in 1910, the venue has become a key cultural landmark in the town and continues to show films as the Chorley Empire Cinema, featuring its 21-foot screen.

== History ==
It first opened as a cinema on 3 September 1910 as the New Empire Electric Theatre, built by the Perfecto Filmograph Co. Ltd. The original capacity was 700 seats; the cheaper seats at the front were wooden, while at the back were the more expensive "plush seats". The highest-quality seating featured green fabric and decorative gold details, while the other seats were red leather and upholstery fabric. The interior of the hall was 66 by 55 feet (20 by 17 m) and it had, for the time, modern central heating and ventilation systems with a mixture of electric and gas lighting. When opened, it screened silent movies, underscored by live piano music. During the 1920s, a new entrance was added at the rear of the theatre, accessible from Dole Lane, designed in a Georgian style with stone-facing, decorative wreaths, and the word EMPIRE inscribed in the gable, this entrance remains in use for access to backstage areas. It gained distinction in the 1950s for its pioneering use of 3D film screenings, among the earliest in the region. After the cinema shut its doors in 1955, the building saw a short period as a dance hall before it was later acquired by someone who ran a car dealership.

In 1960, the building was purchased by the Chorley Amateur Dramatic and Operatic Society (CADOS), who converted it for use as a community theatre called Chorley Little Theatre. Since 1990, the venue returned to its role as a cinema screening films in between productions. The venue has become a hub for local arts, with CADOS staging around six major productions a year, including an annual pantomime, alongside performances by Chorley Youth Theatre, touring comedians, musicians, and film screenings.

In 2009, the theatre first started showing stand-up comedy.

In 2010, CADOS temporarily closed the theatre after discovering a decayed girder in the roof. The closure enabled a £100,000 programme of restoration and improvements, including an expanded bar, new dressing and rehearsal rooms, a new green room, wardrobe space, and a third-floor storage area. Externally, the building was repainted and fitted with new signage.

In January 2019, Chorley Little Theatre announced it would change its name to Chorley Theatre as part of a major rebranding project. At a meeting, members voted in a secret ballot, with 85% supporting the change over the alternatives.

In 2021, the theatre opened the Studio, a 100-seat performance and rehearsal space created in the neighbouring former Indian restaurant. Located next door to the main theatre, the Studio seats up includes a bar and toilets, and is used for smaller productions, comedy and special events.
