= William Mariner (VC) =

Recipient of the Victoria Cross

William Mariner VC
- Born: 29 May 1882; Chorley, Lancashire, England
- Died: 1 July 1916 (aged 34); Loos, France
- Military career
- Allegiance: United Kingdom
- Branch: British Army
- Service years: 1900–1908,1908-1912; 1914–1916
- Rank: Private
- Unit: King's Royal Rifle Corps
- Conflicts: World War I †
- Awards: Victoria Cross

William Mariner VC (29 May 1882 – 1 July 1916) was an English recipient of the Victoria Cross, the highest and most prestigious award for gallantry in the face of the enemy that can be awarded to British and Commonwealth forces.

== Early life ==
William Mariner was born the son of Alice Mariner, who later married John Wignall.

On 3 January 1900 he joined the Army, serving in India. He was twice court martialled, serving a prison sentence for striking an officer. After eight years serving with the colours, he was discharged to the Army Reserve, and returned to Manchester. His service expired after 12 years, and his service record has survived. He had another civilian conviction in that city.

Following the outbreak of war, under the Special Reserve terms of service available to former soldiers, as an inducement to re-enlist, on 26 August 1914 he was able to re-join his old regiment. He failed to declare that he was a former convict. On 29 November 1914, he arrived in France, among a draft of reinforcements for 2nd Battalion, KRRC. (Note: 'Born at 12 Wellington Street, Chorley, Preston, Lancashire, son of Mrs A Wignall and was educated at the Parochial School, Chorley, joining the 2nd King's Royal Rifle Corps about 1902.[sic] He served seven years in India with the Colours and five years afterwards in the Reserve and was discharged on the termination of his engagement. On 26 August 1914, he re-enlisted with his old battalion, the 2nd King's Royal Rifles and proceeded to France, 29 November 1914.')

== Details ==
Mariner was 32 years old, and a private in the 2nd Battalion, The King's Royal Rifle Corps, British Army during the First World War when the following deed took place for which he was awarded the VC.

The citation for the award, published in the London Gazette on 23 June 1915, read:

No. 2052 Private William Mariner, 2nd Battalion, The King's Royal Rifle Corps.

During a violent thunderstorm on the night of 22nd May, 1915, he left his trench near Cambrin, and crept out through the German wire entanglements till he reached the emplacement of a German machine gun which had been damaging our parapets and hindering our working parties.

After climbing on the top of the German parapet he threw a bomb in under the roof of the gun emplacement and- heard some groaning and the enemy running away. After about a quarter of an hour he heard some of them coming back again, and climbed up on the other side of the emplacement and threw another bomb among them left-handed. He then lay still while the Germans opened a heavy fire on the wire entanglement behind him, and it was only after about an hour that he was able to crawl back to his own trench.

Before starting out he had requested a serjeant to open fire on the enemy's trenches as soon as he had thrown his bombs. Rifleman Mariner was out alone for one and a half hours carrying out this gallant work.

== Death ==
William Mariner was killed on the evening of 30 June 1916 or the early morning of 1 July 1916 during a large scale raid in the Railway Triangle, south of Loos. This raid was a diversionary attack on the eve of the Somme offensive. His death was witnessed by Giles E. M. Eyre and others who wrote "that Mariner seemed to lose control during a heavy bombardment, ran down an enemy trench and was last seen bayoneting a German as a shell exploded on him, blowing him to pieces." (Note: 'The author... returned to France, when his new battalion (2 KRRC ) launched a large scale raid on the Triangle at Loos – a raid which cost over 240 casualties, including Rifleman William Mariner VC, who was blown to pieces in front of the author!')

== Medal ==
In late 2005, during a house clearance of the property of William Wignall, the Victoria Cross medal was found in a drawer, without any campaign medals. The following year William Mariner's cross was sold by his relatives at auction for £120,750.
