= Chorley =

Town in Lancashire, England

Coordinates: 53°39′13″N 2°37′46″W

- Town
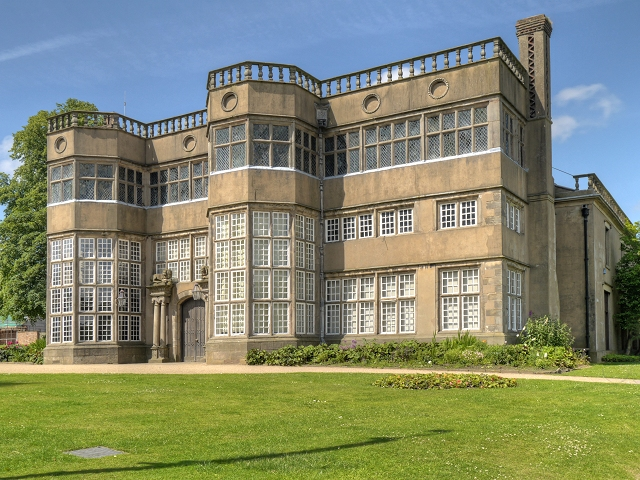
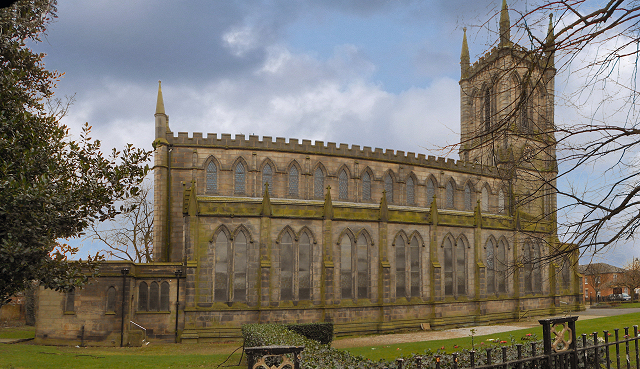
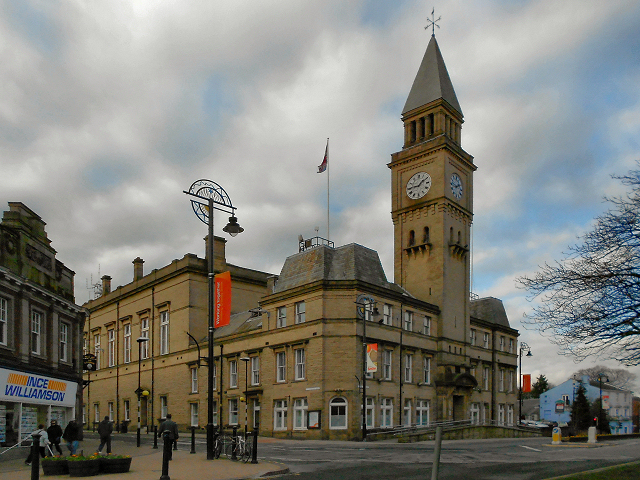
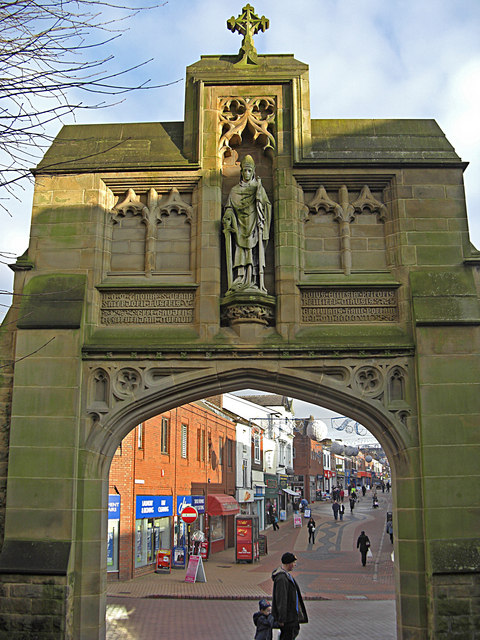
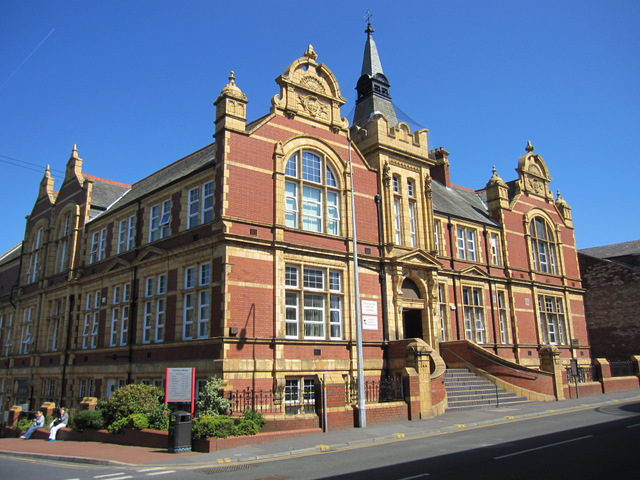
- Astley Hall St George's Church Chorley Town Hall Chapel Street Chorley Library

- Shown within Chorley Borough Location within Lancashire
- Population: 39,523 (2021)
- OS grid reference: SD5817
- District: Chorley
- Shire county: Lancashire
- Region: North West
- Country: England
- Sovereign state: United Kingdom
- Post town: CHORLEY
- Postcode district: PR6, PR7
- Dialling code: 01257
- Police: Lancashire
- Fire: Lancashire
- Ambulance: North West
- UK Parliament: Chorley

Chorley is a town and the administrative centre of the wider Borough of Chorley in Lancashire, England, 8 miles (13 km) north of Wigan, 11 miles (18 km) south west of Blackburn, 11 miles (18 km) north west of Bolton, 12 miles (19 km) south of Preston and 20 miles (32 km) north west of Manchester. The town's wealth came principally from the cotton industry. In 2021, it had a population of 39,523.

In the 1970s, the skyline was dominated by factory chimneys, but most have now been demolished: remnants of the industrial past include Morrisons chimney and other mill buildings, and the streets of terraced houses for mill workers. Chorley is the home of the Chorley cake.

== History ==
=== Toponymy ===
The name Chorley comes from two Anglo-Saxon words, ċeorl and lēah, probably meaning "the peasants' clearing". Ley (also lēah or leigh) is a common element of place-name, meaning a clearing in a woodland; ċeorl refers to a person of status similar to a freeman or a yeoman.

=== Prehistory ===
There was no known occupation in Chorley until the Middle Ages, though archaeological evidence has shown that the area around the town has been inhabited since at least the Bronze Age. There are various remains of prehistoric occupation on the nearby Anglezarke Moor, including the Round Loaf tumulus which is believed to date from 3500 BC.

A pottery burial urn from this period was discovered in 1963 on land next to Astley Hall Farm and later excavation in the 1970s revealed another burial urn and four cremation pits dating from the Bronze Age.

=== Roman period ===
During the Roman era a Roman road ran near Chorley between Wigan and Walton-le-Dale. Hoards dating from the Roman period have also been found nearby at Whittle-le-Woods and Heapey.

=== Medieval period ===
Chorley was not listed in the Domesday Book of 1086, though it is thought to be one of the twelve berewicks in the Leyland Hundred.

Chorley first appears in historical records in the mid thirteenth century as part of the portion of the Croston Lordship acquired by William de Ferrers, Earl of Derby, around 1250. The Earl established Chorley as a small borough comprising a two-row settlement arranged along what later became Market Street. It appears that the borough was short lived, as it does not appear in a report of a commission on the Leyland Hundred in 1341. It is most likely that the borough was sacked by the Scots during the Great Raid of 1322, with Chorley being one of the southernmost points reached in Northern England. This led to the construction of a Peel tower, which said to have been located somewhere close to Duxbury Hall.

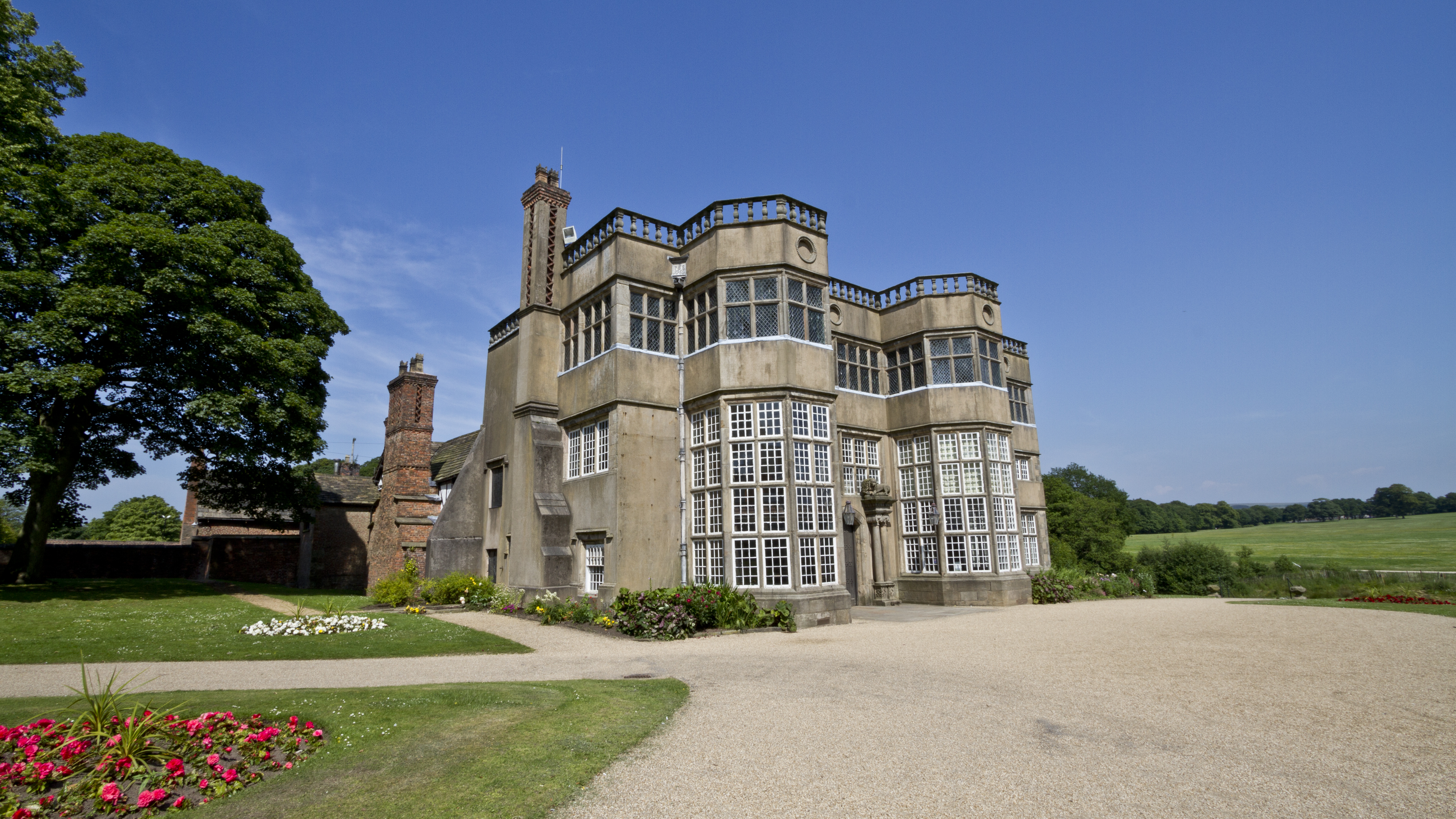
Astley Hall

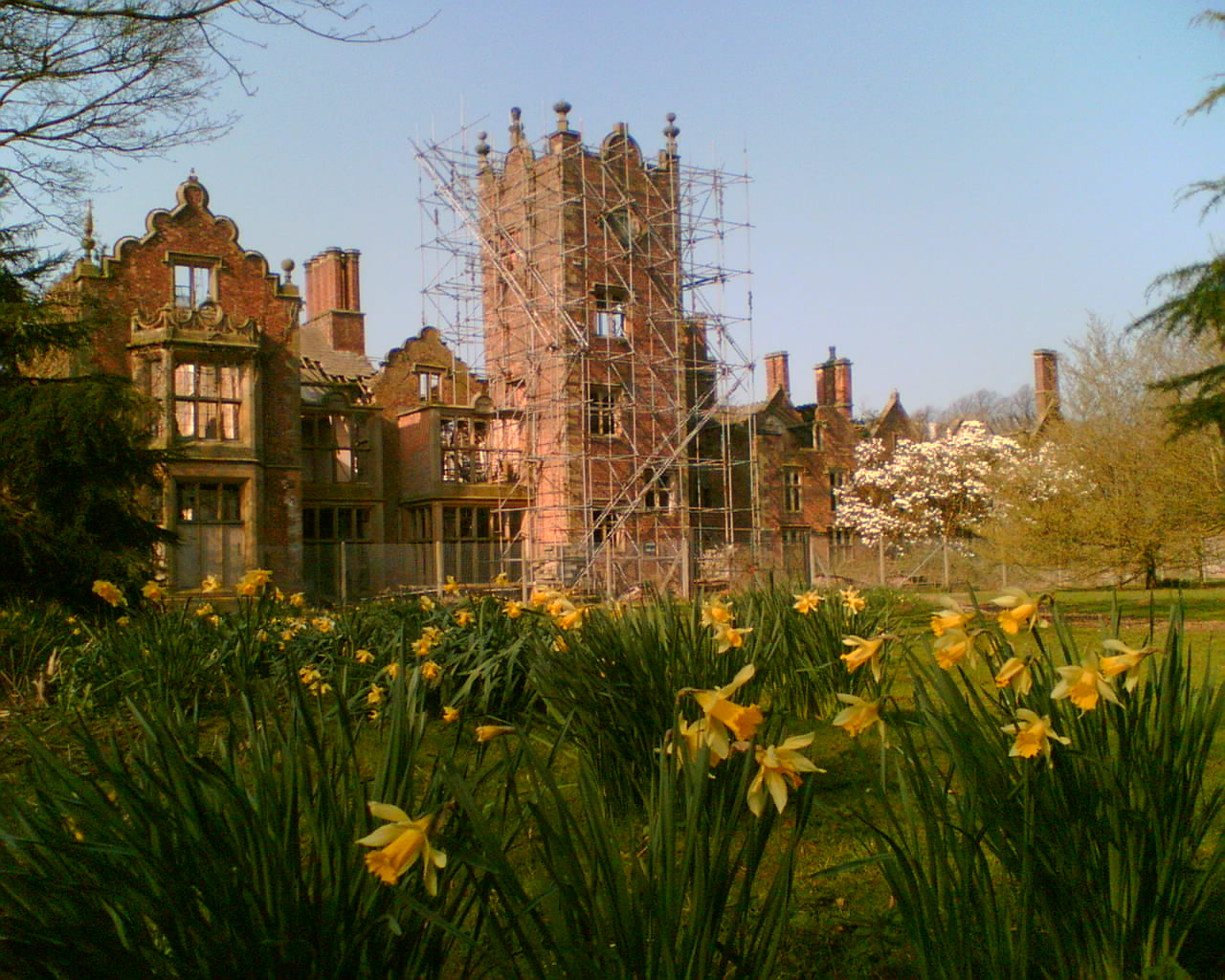
Bank Hall, Bretherton, a Jacobean mansion house, awaiting restoration. Home to Lancashire's oldest Yew tree and one of the two fallen sequoia in the UK. Open on limited open days arranged by the Bank Hall Action Group.

The manorial history of Chorley is complex. The manor had no single lord throughout most of this period, as it had been split into moieties and was managed by several different families. This led to Chorley having several manorial halls, which in this period included Chorley Hall, which was built in the 14th century by the de Chorley family but was demolished in the 19th or 20th century. Very little is known of Chorley Hall, although, according to what the painter John Bird depicted in 1795, its location to where it once stood is said to have been where The Parish of St Laurence Church of England Primary School now stands, with phantom steps near to the school within Astley Park being the only physical clue to the hall's existence. There is also Lower Chorley Hall, which was owned by the Gillibrand family from 1583 (later rebuilt in the 19th century as Gillibrand Hall). It is believed the borough of Chorley was not a success in this period because of the lack of manorial leadership and the dispersed nature of the small population.

St Laurence's Church is the oldest remaining building in Chorley and first appears in historical records when it was dedicated in 1362. However, it is believed there was already an earlier Anglo-Saxon chapel on the site, which was a daughter foundation of Croston Parish Church. It is believed that the church is named after Saint Laurence, an Irish saint who died in Normandy in the 12th century, whose bones were conveyed to the church by local noble Sir Rowland Standish of Duxbury, an ancestor of Myles Standish (an English military officer hired by the Pilgrims as military adviser for their Plymouth expedition to the New World).

As happened in many other instances following the Dissolution of the Monasteries, these relics went missing in the turmoil of the English Reformation under the rule of Henry VIII.

Chorley was granted a market charter by Henry VII in 1498 and have since held it every Tuesday. Before the reformation, it would coincide with a fair that was held annually on the feast of St Lawrence.

=== 19th century to present ===
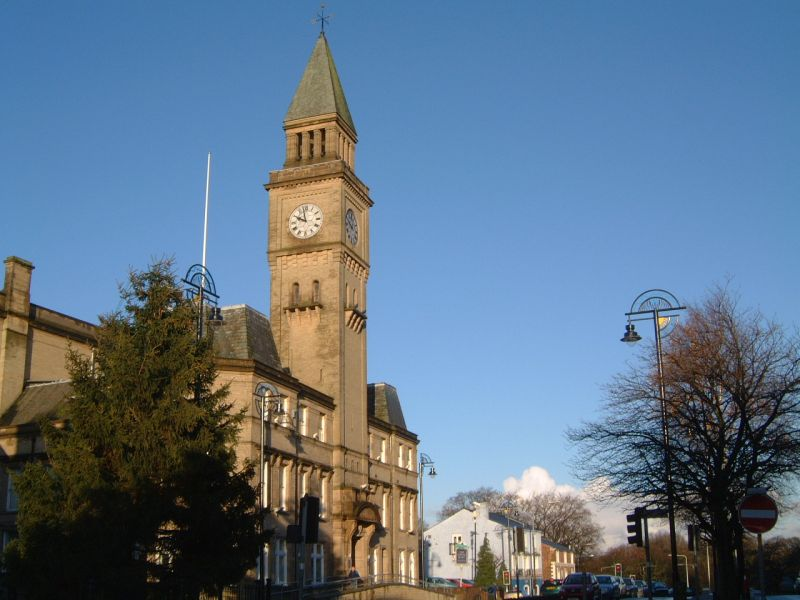
Chorley Town Hall by the architects John Ladds and William Henry Powell (opened 1879)

Chorley, like most Lancashire towns, gained its wealth from the Industrial Revolution of the 19th century which was also responsible for the town's growth. Chorley was a vital cotton town with many mills littering the skyline up to the late twentieth century. Most mills were demolished between the 1950s and 2000s with those remaining converted for modern business purposes. Today only a minority remain in use for actual manufacturing, and the last mill to stop producing textiles was Lawrence's in 2009.

Also, given its location on the edge of Lancashire Coalfield, Chorley was vital in coal mining. Several pits existed in Duxbury Woods, the Gillibrand area and more numerously in Coppull. Chisnall Hall Colliery at Coppull was considered the biggest Lancashire pit outside of Wigan and one of many located in the Chorley suburb. The last pit in the area to close was the Ellerbeck Colliery in 1987 which was located south of Chorley, between Coppull and Adlington.

The town played an important role during the Second World War, when it was home to the Royal Ordnance Factory, a large munitions manufacturer in the village of Euxton about 2 miles (3 km) from the town centre. A smaller factory was also built near the railway line of Blackburn–Wigan in Heapey.

== Religion ==
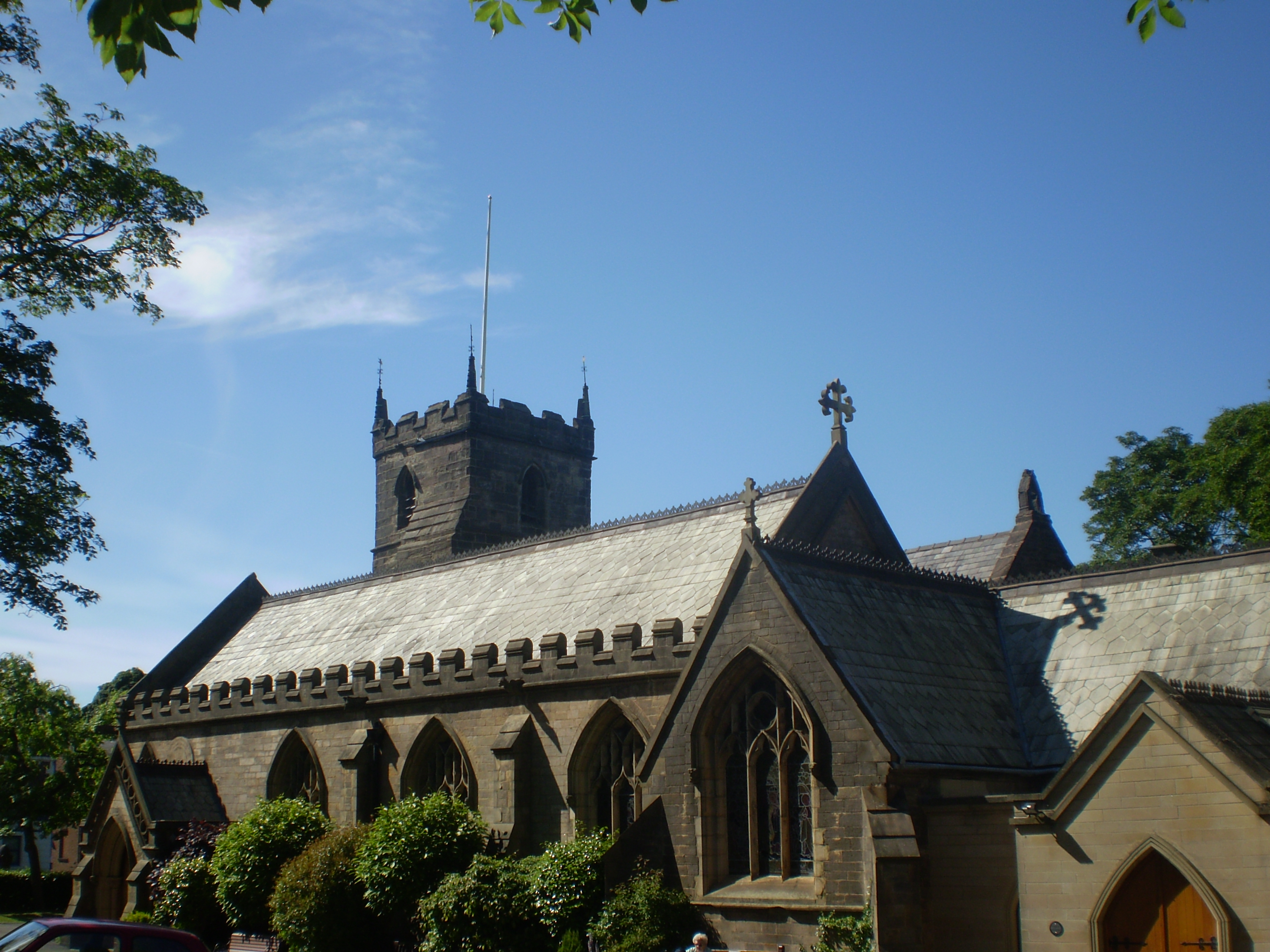
St. Laurence's Church

The Church of England parish church of St Laurence, located on Union Street, has been a place of Christian worship for over 800 years. The Church of England parish church of St George, situated on St George's Street, is an important example of the work of architect Thomas Rickman, a major figure in the Gothic Revival. It was built as a Commissioners' church in 1822.

St Mary's Roman Catholic Church is based in the town centre at Mount Pleasant. The parish was founded in 1847, in a chapel in Chapel Street. The land for the church was purchased in 1851 and the first building erected in 1853, designed by Pugin & Pugin of London and Hansom.. It was opened in June 1853. The church can sit 750 persons.

Chorley United Reformed Church (URC) is one of the oldest and largest URC in the north west. Founded in 1792 as an Independent Church it later affiliated to the Congregational church and in 1972 voted to become part of the new United Reformed Church. The church is home to the oldest Scout Troop in the town, established in 1919. In January 2017 it was announced that the church building, which had been at its current site since 1792, would be demolished, and the congregation relocated to other premises. These plans never came to fruition and the church building was instead refurbished in 2020.

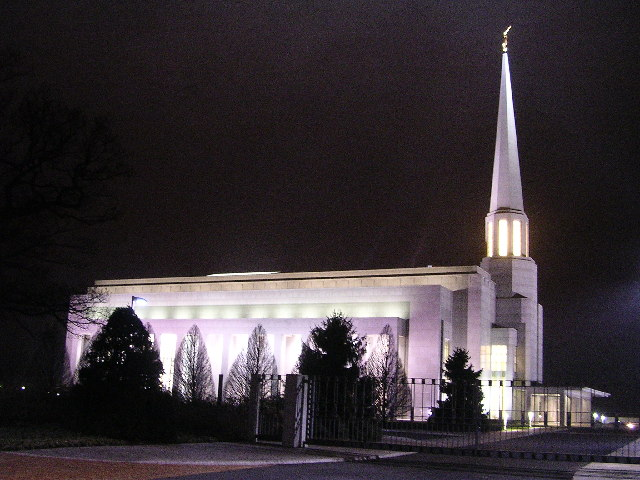
Preston England Temple which serves the Latter-day Saint population of Northern England, Scotland and all Ireland

In the north of the town, there is a park containing a meeting house and a temple of the Church of Jesus Christ of Latter-day Saints (LDS Church). The temple, which is regarded as a local landmark, is the largest LDS temple in Europe and named the Preston England Temple. Construction on the temple commenced in 1994 and was completed in 1998. Connected to the temple campus is the England Missionary Training Centre for the LDS Church which houses church representatives preparing to fill proselytizing and service assignments in Great Britain and other parts of Europe.

Chorley's first mosque is on the corner of Brooke Street and Charnock Street. The building officially opened in March 2006, having been in planning for over three years. A second mosque opened in 2020.

== Governance ==
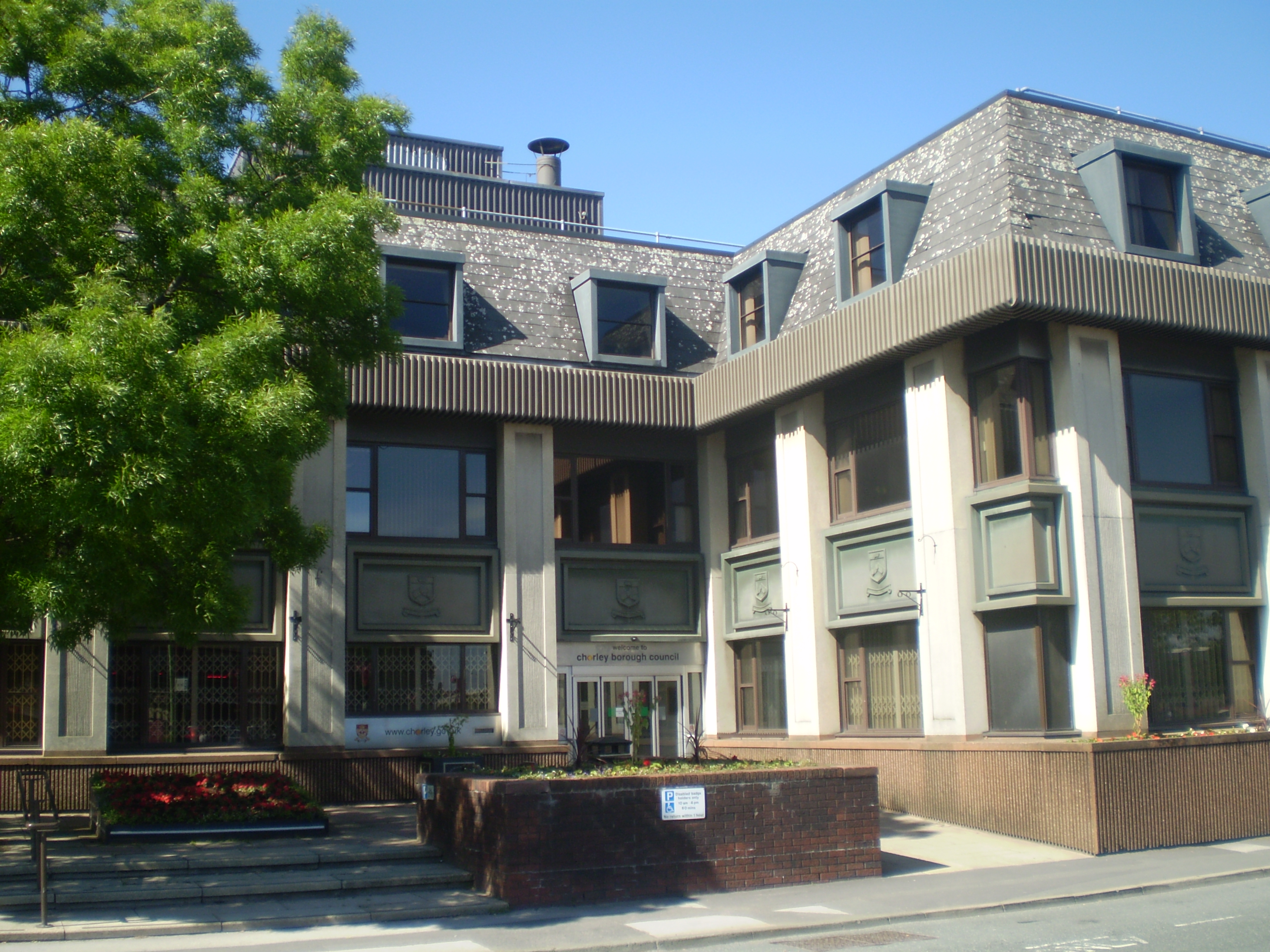
Chorley Council Building, Union Street

In 1837, Chorley joined with other townships (or civil parishes) in the area to become head of the Chorley Poor Law Union, which took responsibility for the administration and funding of the Poor Law in the area. Chorley became incorporated as a municipal borough in 1881; it was governed by a mayor, a council of eight aldermen and twenty four councillors.

The population of the Municipal Borough of Chorley remained roughly static in the 20th century, with the 1911 census showing 30,315 people and the 1971 census showing 31,665. Under the Local Government Act 1972, Chorley became the core of a larger non-metropolitan district on 1 April 1974. The present Borough of Chorley has forty-two councillors, representing 14 three-member electoral wards in Chorley town council.

The Member of Parliament for the constituency of Chorley, since 1997, is Lindsay Hoyle, Speaker of the House of Commons. He was formerly a Labour MP.

== Geography ==
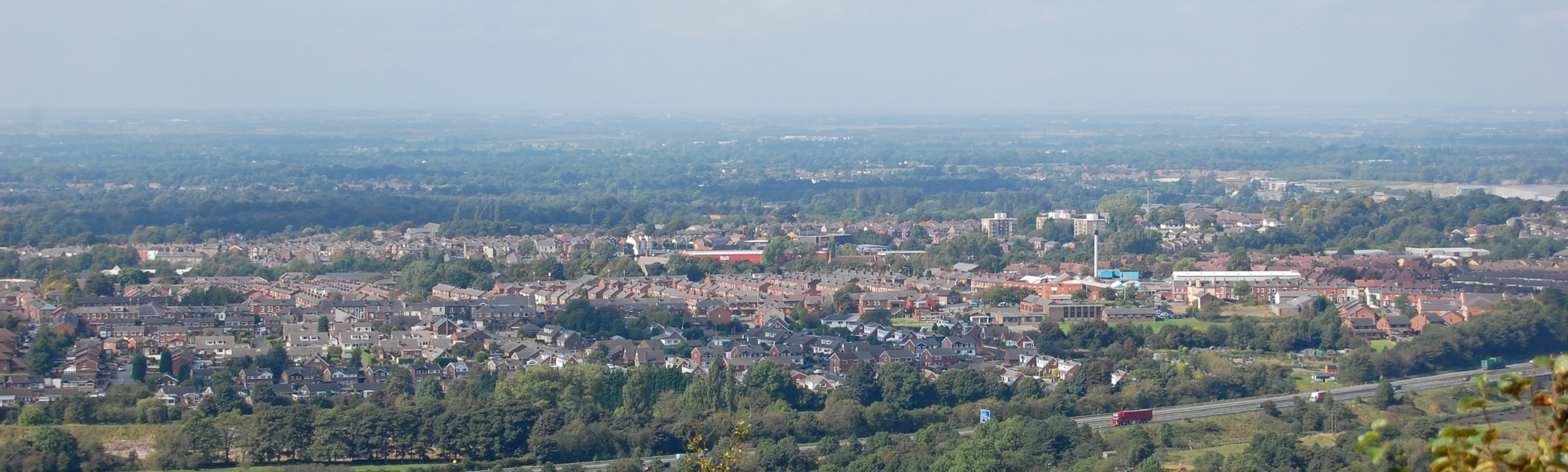
A panoramic view over Chorley from Healey Nab

The principal river in the town is the Yarrow. The Black Brook is a tributary of the Yarrow. The name of the River Chor was back-formed from Chorley and runs not far from the centre of the town, notably through Astley Park. Chorley is located at the foot of the West Pennine Moors and is overlooked by Healey Nab, a small hill which is part of the West Pennine Moors. It is the seat for the Borough of Chorley, which is made up of Chorley and its surrounding villages.

Climate data for Chorley based on nearest station at Preston, elevation 33 m, 1971–2000, extremes 1960–2005
| Month | Jan | Feb | Mar | Apr | May | Jun | Jul | Aug | Sep | Oct | Nov | Dec | Year |
|---|---|---|---|---|---|---|---|---|---|---|---|---|---|
| Record high °C (°F) | 14.1 (57.4) | 16.2 (61.2) | 22.2 (72.0) | 24.0 (75.2) | 27.3 (81.1) | 30.6 (87.1) | 38.2 (100.8) | 33.1 (91.6) | 26.8 (80.2) | 23.6 (74.5) | 18.4 (65.1) | 15.6 (60.1) | 33.1 (91.6) |
| Mean daily maximum °C (°F) | 6.9 (44.4) | 7.3 (45.1) | 9.4 (48.9) | 12.0 (53.6) | 15.6 (60.1) | 17.7 (63.9) | 19.8 (67.6) | 19.5 (67.1) | 16.8 (62.2) | 13.4 (56.1) | 9.7 (49.5) | 7.7 (45.9) | 13.0 (55.4) |
| Mean daily minimum °C (°F) | 1.7 (35.1) | 1.9 (35.4) | 3.1 (37.6) | 4.5 (40.1) | 7.1 (44.8) | 10.0 (50.0) | 12.2 (54.0) | 12.1 (53.8) | 9.9 (49.8) | 7.3 (45.1) | 4.0 (39.2) | 2.4 (36.3) | 6.4 (43.5) |
| Record low °C (°F) | −11.1 (12.0) | −13.3 (8.1) | −9.4 (15.1) | −4.5 (23.9) | −2.3 (27.9) | 0.6 (33.1) | 4.4 (39.9) | 2.8 (37.0) | −0.5 (31.1) | −5.2 (22.6) | −6.7 (19.9) | −12.8 (9.0) | −13.3 (8.1) |
| Average precipitation mm (inches) | 93.83 (3.69) | 63.66 (2.51) | 79.11 (3.11) | 52.08 (2.05) | 58.79 (2.31) | 73.51 (2.89) | 65.40 (2.57) | 86.51 (3.41) | 92.00 (3.62) | 113.78 (4.48) | 103.86 (4.09) | 112.02 (4.41) | 997.99 (39.29) |
| Average snowy days | 2 | 2 | 1 | 1 | 0 | 0 | 0 | 0 | 0 | 0 | 1 | 2 | 9 |
Source: KNMI

Chorley had a population of 33,424 at the 2001 census, with the wider borough of Chorley having a population of 101,991. Chorley forms a conurbation with Preston and Leyland and was once proposed as being designated part of the Central Lancashire New Town under the New Towns Act, a proposal which was eventually scaled back.

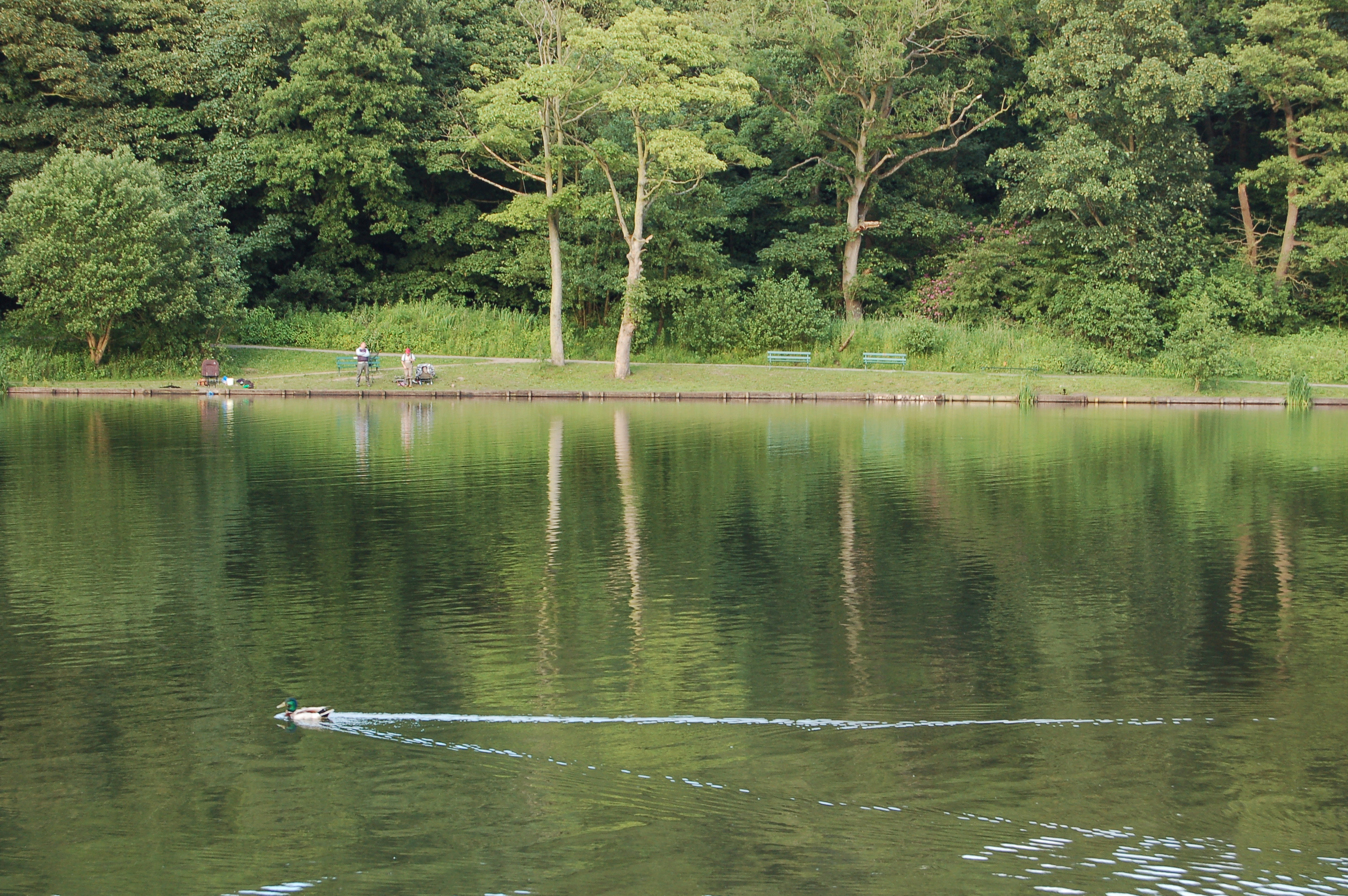
Yarrow Valley Country Park

== Economy ==
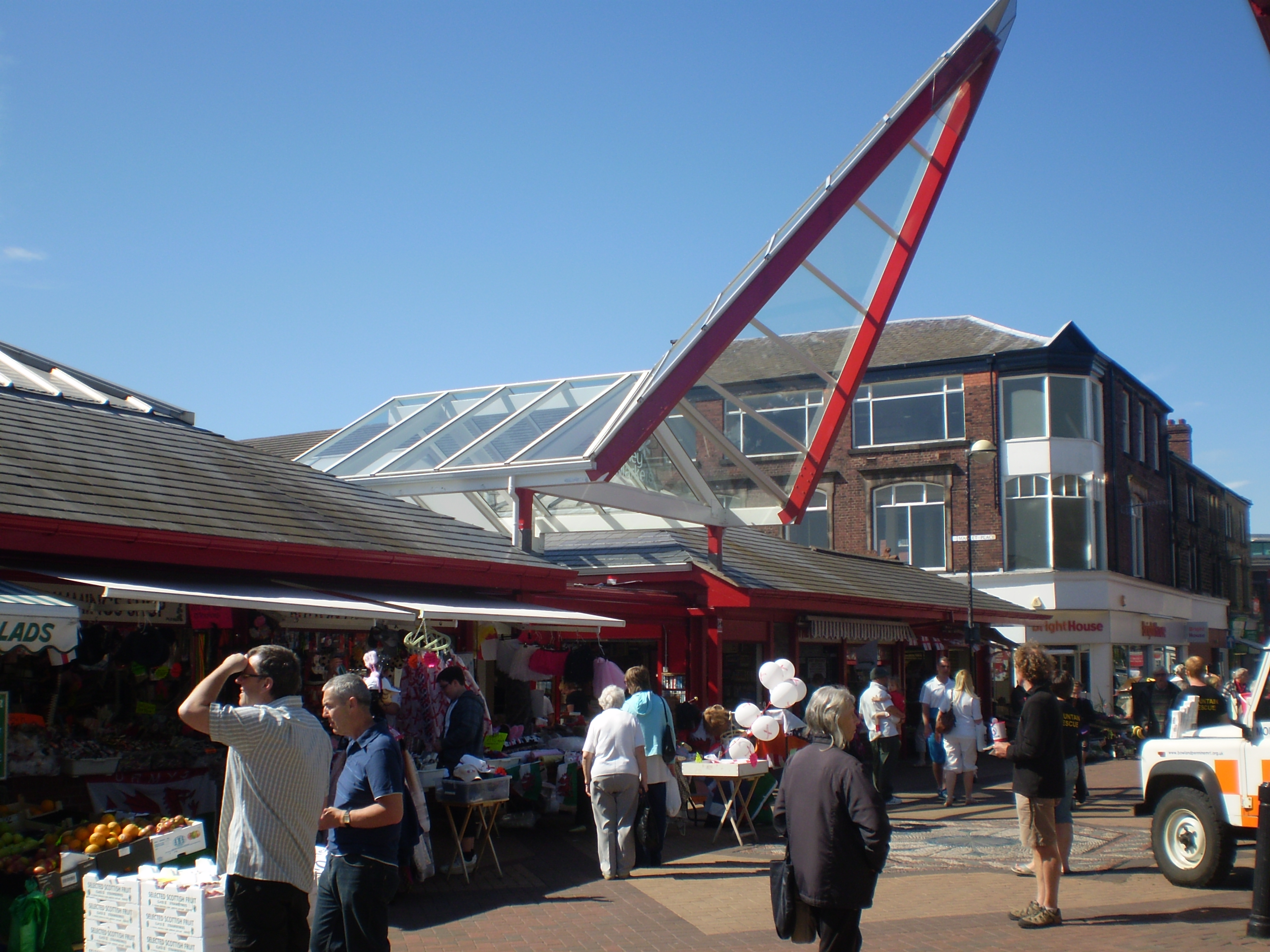
Chorley Market

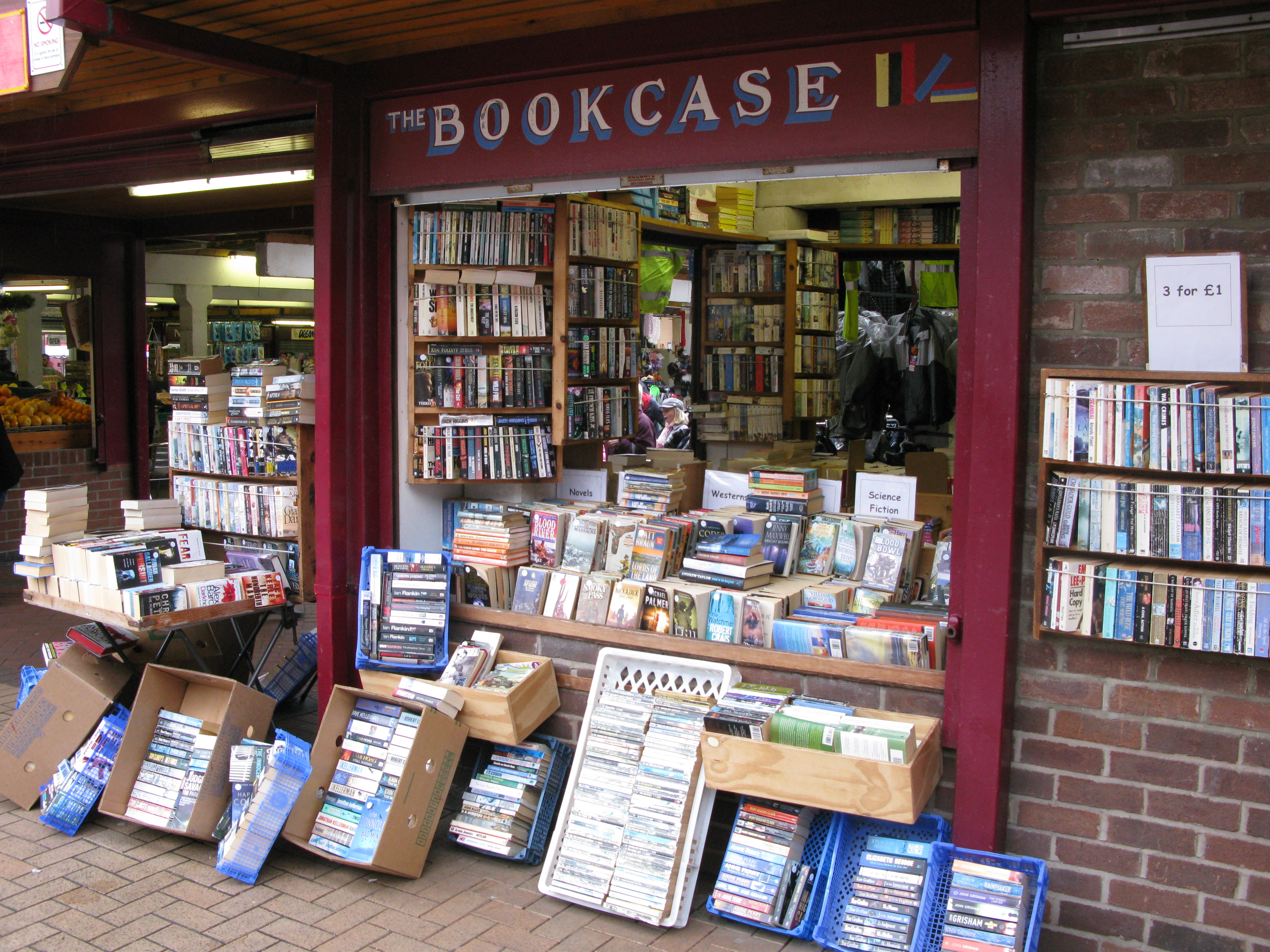
The Bookcase Shop, Chorley Market

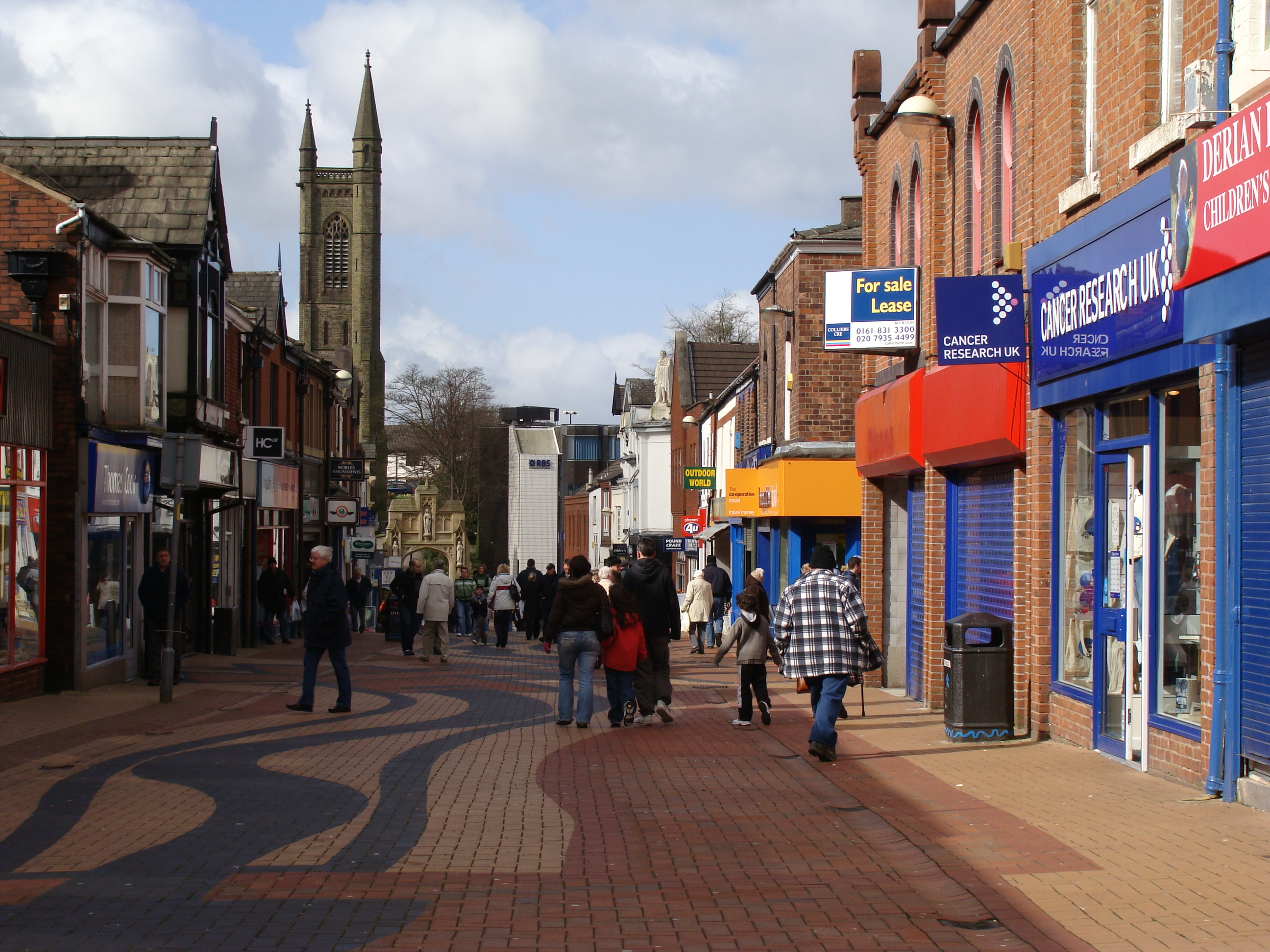
Shoppers on Chapel Street, Chorley town centre

The first signs of industry, as with many towns in Lancashire, was mining; evidence of which can be seen by the various abandoned quarries on the outskirts of the town. One of these is Anglezarke Quarry, between Chorley and Horwich. Remnants of mining include an old railway bridge from the Duxbury Mine off Wigan Lane. Eventually, the mining industry was replaced by cotton mills.

Manufacture of trucks was inherited from the neighbouring town of Leyland. A large factory on Pilling Lane produced, including military vehicles and tanks during the Second World War.

After the Second World War, production was reduced and the final part of the site was closed in 2008 by BAE Systems. A large part of the site has been redeveloped for residential and industrial use as Buckshaw Village. Through the twentieth century, especially the latter half, Chorley suffered the loss of much of its manufacturing capacity with great losses in or the complete disappearance of its coal, textiles, motor vehicles and armaments industries.

Leyland Trucks and BAE Systems are Central Lancashire's largest employers, with their sites in Leyland and Samlesbury respectively.

Other companies with a presence in the borough are:

- Telent
- FedEx's North West depot is located in the town
- DXC Technology has two locations: one in Euxton and the other in Clayton-le-Woods, north of Chorley
- Multipart Solutions Limited, successor to the parts arm of the Leyland DAF
- Porter Lancastrian is a manufacturer of beer pumps, under the Porta brand

In 2011, Chorley Council launched an initiative, Choose Chorley, to encourage SMEs and large businesses to relocate to Chorley. The initiative offers red carpet introductions to key people in the town, financial incentives and tailored support for business growth.

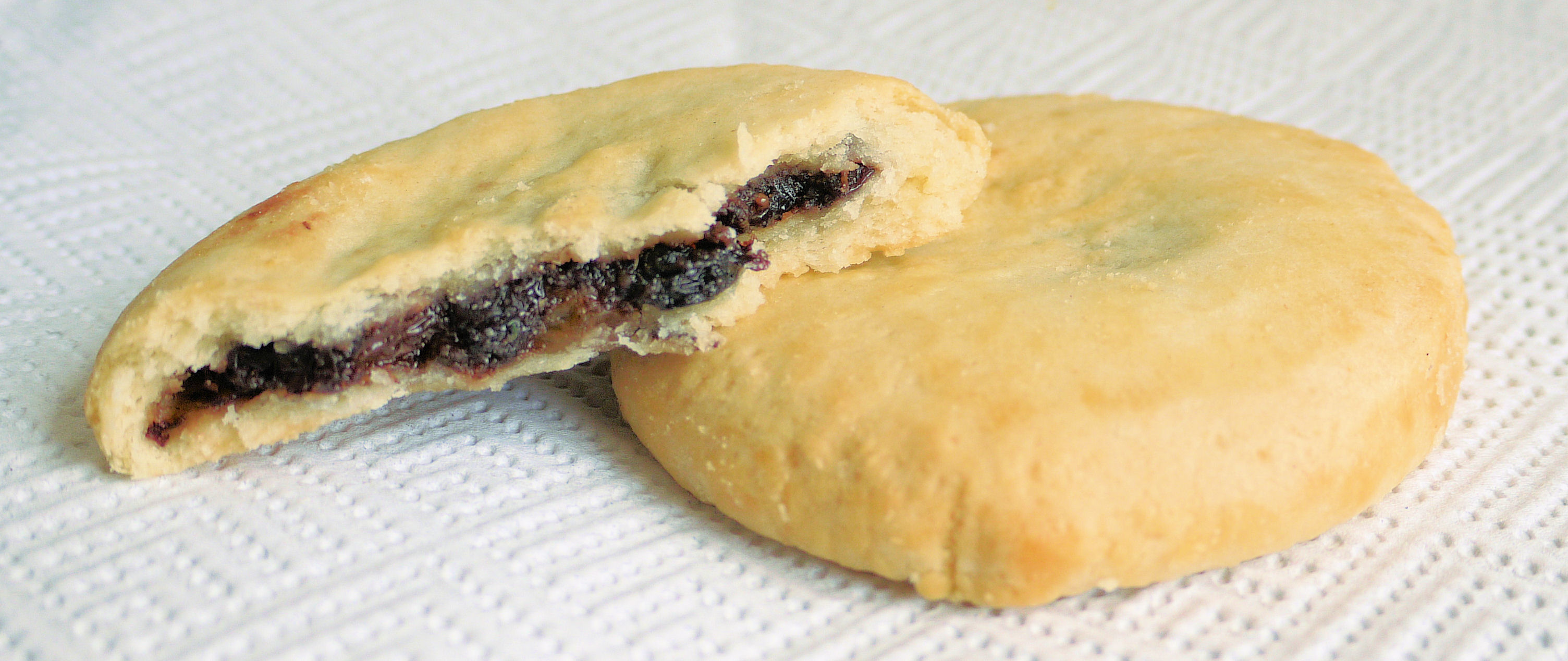
The Chorley cake

The town is the home of the Chorley cake. Every October, the Chorley Cake Street Fair promotes the cakes, with a competition for local bakers to produce the largest ever Chorley cake; the event restarted in 1995.

== Healthcare ==
Chorley is served by the local NHS hospital Chorley and South Ribble Hospital which is located on Euxton Lane, in addition to a private hospital located in Euxton. The town also had another major hospital formerly on Eaves Lane, before this closed in the 1990s. There was also the Heath Charnock isolation hospital on Hut Lane which dealt with infectious diseases before reverting to use for long term patients, before closing in the 1990s.

== Transport ==
=== Road ===
Chorley town centre is bisected by the A6 Roman road. It is located near to junctions 6 and 8 of the M61 motorway and junction 27 of the M6; Charnock Richard services are sited within the borough.

=== Buses ===
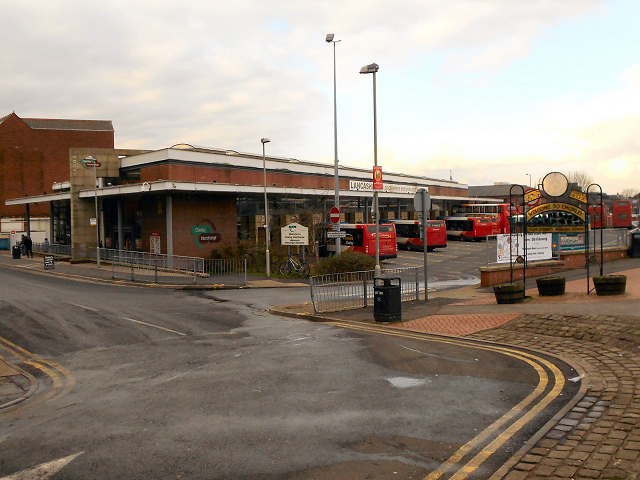
Chorley Interchange

The town's bus station, Chorley Interchange, opened in February 2003, replacing an older building. Services are provided by several operators:

- Stagecoach Cumbria and North Lancashire is the town’s primary operator, with routes to Bolton, Leyland, Preston and a summer service to the Lake District
- The Blackburn Bus Company operate services to Blackburn
- Tyrers Coaches operate buses to Preston and surrounding areas
- Preston Bus operates buses to Leyland and Ormskirk.
- Go North West operates services to Wigan under the Bee Network franchise.
- Vision Bus operates services to Southport, Ormskirk, Leyland and Preston

=== Railway ===
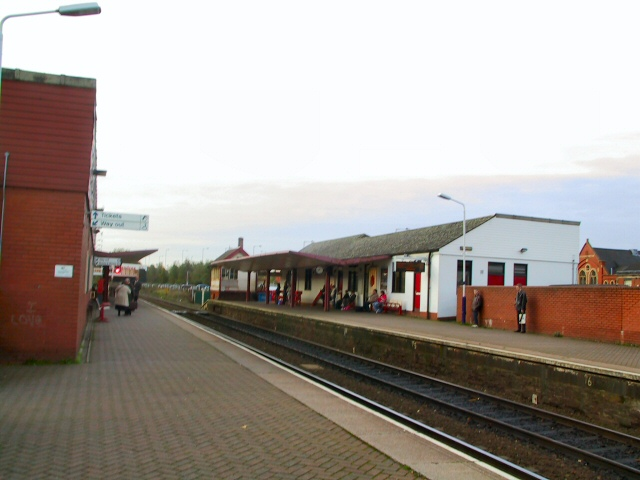
Chorley railway station

Chorley railway station is served by Northern, which operates routes on the Manchester to Preston Line; direct destinations include Bolton, Preston, Barrow, Blackpool, Manchester Piccadilly and Manchester Airport.

TransPennine Express services, which operate from Manchester Airport to Glasgow or Edinburgh, pass through the station but do not stop.

The station was also served by the Wigan-Blackburn line, until it was closed in 1960; the line also had stops at Heapey, Brinscall, Withnell and White Bear (Adlington).

Elsewhere in the borough, there are railway stations at Euxton, on the Preston - Wigan line; at Adlington and Buckshaw Village, on the Manchester–Preston line; and at Croston, on the Ormskirk Branch Line.

=== Waterways ===
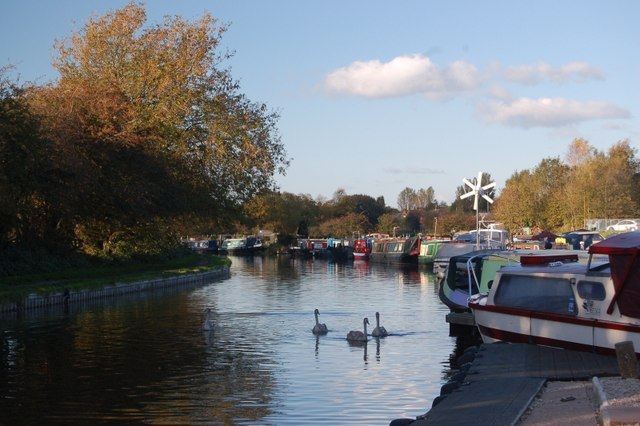
Leeds and Liverpool Canal

The Leeds and Liverpool Canal runs parallel to Chorley; several marinas and locks are located in the area, including:

- White Bear Marina, Adlington
- Cowling Launch, Chorley
- Top Lock, Whittle
- Botany Brow
- Botany Bay Boatyard
- Riley Green, Hoghton

== Education ==
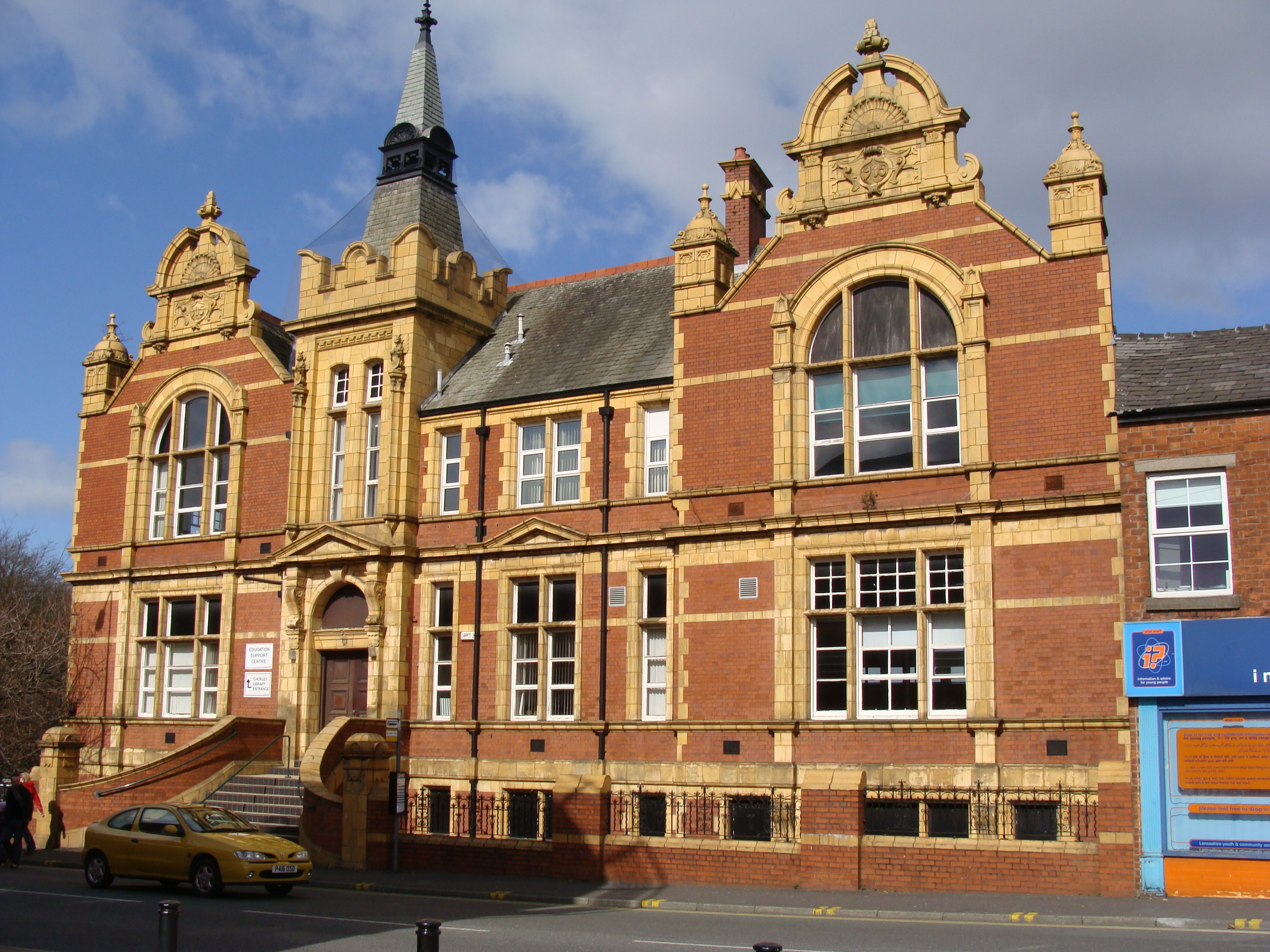
Chorley Central Library

Chorley is home to numerous primary schools, both council and church supported. The town has the following six high schools:

- Holy Cross Catholic High School
- Albany Academy
- Bishop Rawstorne CE Academy
- Parklands High School
- Southlands High School
- St. Michael's CE High School

Some independent schools are also present just outside the borough. Most Chorley children go on to attend the nearby Runshaw College in Leyland. Runshaw College had also expanded into the former administration site of ROF Chorley and was using, amongst others, the main administration building. It is no longer using the site.

Lancashire College, based in Chorley, is a part of Lancashire County Council's Lancashire Adult Learning, offering a wide range of courses, a speciality being intensive residential language courses. From 1905 to 1981, the town was home to Chorley Training College (from the 1960s known as Chorley 'Day' Training College), designed by the Victorian and Edwardian architect Henry Cheers, and the town centre building now occupying this site is now Chorley Public Library.

== Sport ==
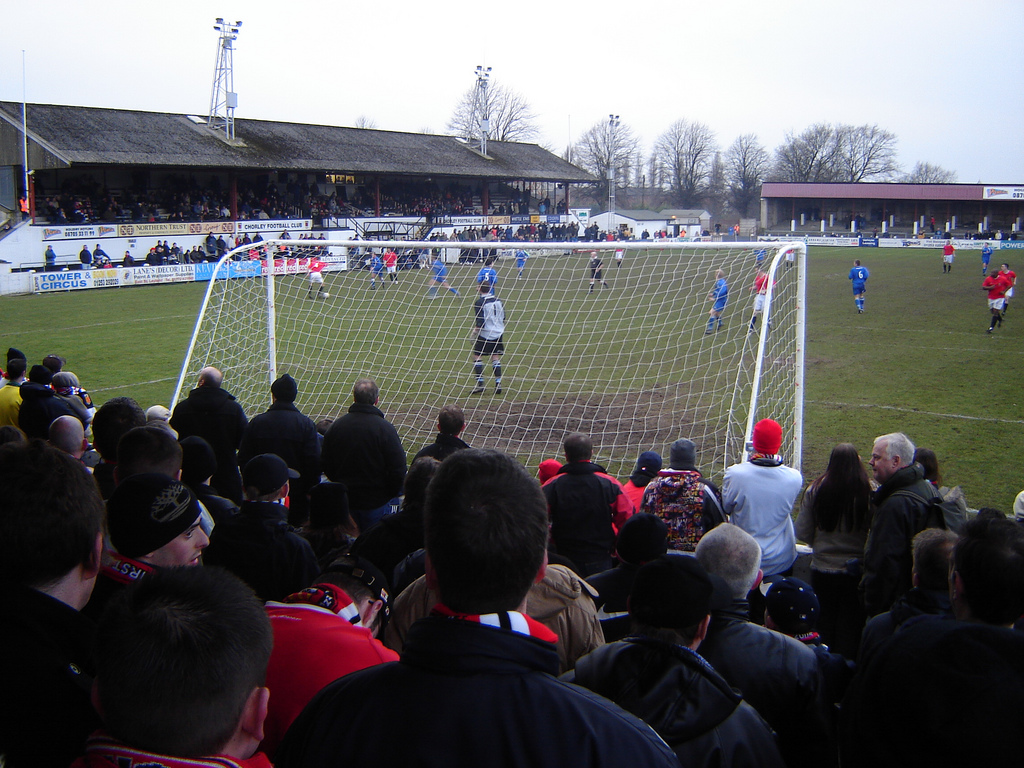
Victory Park, the home of Chorley Football Club

Chorley is home to the semi professional football team, Chorley F.C., known as the Magpies due to their black and white strip. Founded as a rugby team in 1875, they switched to playing football eight years later. Since then they have had limited success, with their most memorable moments being two appearances in the second round of the FA Cup and two seasons in the Football Conference in the late 1980s. They played in the National League in the 2019–20 season having won promotion from the National League North in the previous season, but were relegated back to the National League North. The team qualified for the 4th round of the 2020–21 season of the FA Cup.

The town and surrounding boroughs boast a number of cricket clubs, with two teams taking the town's name. Chorley Cricket Club currently play in the Northern League and were finalists in the ECB National Club Cricket Championship for three consecutive seasons from 1994 to 1996, winning the trophy on the first two occasions. Chorley St James Cricket Club are the second side in the town, competing in the Southport & District Amateur Cricket League, having been members of the Chorley League until its demise in 2005.

The town is home to the Chorley Buccaneers American football Club. Founded in the year 2000, the Bucs now have eight competitive teams and over 120 players competing in the BAFA National Leagues structure. They are based at Parklands Academy in Chorley.

Chorley RUFC was founded in the early 1970s. The club currently run two senior sides and a mini section, the 1st XV playing in the RFU North Lancs 2 division.

Until 2004, Chorley had a rugby league side, Chorley Lynx, who played in League Two of the Rugby League National Leagues. The club was forced to close in 2004, due to small crowds and the withdrawal of funding by backer Trevor Hemmings. Many of the club's players and staff joined nearby Blackpool Panthers. The only rugby league side currently active who are situated in Chorley is amateur side Chorley Panthers.

Chorley is home to track cyclists including Olympic gold medal winners Jason Queally and Bradley Wiggins, and Paralympic silver medallist Rik Waddon, due in part to the proximity of the town to the Manchester Velodrome; it is also the home town of Paralympic gold medallist Natalie Jones.

The council owned leisure centre contains a swimming pool, sports hall, squash courts and a small fitness suite. The borough also includes other gym facilities, two other council-owned leisure centres (at Clayton Green and Coppull) and another public swimming pool at Brinscall. The town is also home to a Next Generation fitness centre, other private pools and leisure centres, and a David Lloyd Tennis Centre.

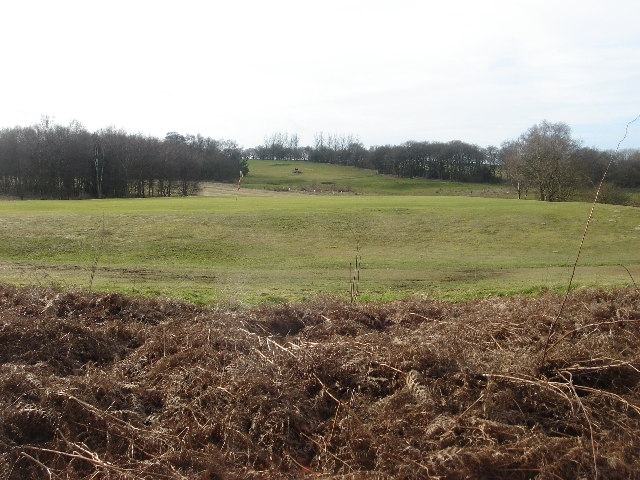
Duxbury Golf Course, Duxbury Park

Duxbury Park municipal golf course is 1 mile (2 km) south of Chorley town centre.

The town is home to many amateur football, rugby and cricket teams. There are also several grass football pitches, bowling greens and tennis courts. A public outdoor swimming pool in Astley Park was demolished in the 1990s.

Chorley Athletic and Triathlon Club regularly compete in road, cross country, fell, athletics and triathlon events. Chorley Cycling Club was formed in 2011, resurrecting a club which had disbanded around 1953. The club caters to both leisure and racing members and runs regular training and social rides on local roads. Chorley JKS Shotokan Karate Club was established in the town in 2012.

== Media ==
Chorley has two local newspapers: The weekly Lancashire Evening Post (formerly Chorley Guardian) and the free Chorley Citizen.

Local news and television programmes are provided by BBC North West and ITV Granada. Television signals are received from the Winter Hill TV transmitter

Local radio stations are BBC Radio Lancashire, Heart North West, Smooth North West, Greatest Hits Radio Lancashire, Capital Manchester and Lancashire and Central Radio North West which broadcast from Preston.

A British comedy television show, Phoenix Nights, cited Chorley's radio station, Chorley FM. The station, based in Chorley, originally broadcast for only a few weeks, but in 2005 received a licence to broadcast from Chorley Community Centre (see Chorley FM).

It is the home of actor Joseph Gilgun, of Brassic, This is England, Misfits and Preacher.

== Places of interest ==
Key
| | Abbey/Priory/Cathedral |
| Accessible open space | Accessible open space |
| | Amusement/Theme Park |
| | Castle |
| Country Park | Country Park |
| | English Heritage |
| | Forestry Commission |
| Heritage railway | Heritage railway |
| Historic house | Historic House |
| Places of Worship | Places of Worship |
| Museum (free) Museum | Museum (free/not free) |
| National Trust | National Trust |
| | Theatre |
| | Zoo |

- Barrica Wines
- Astley Park and Astley Hall
- Bank Hall
- Chorley Theatre
- Preston England Temple
- Duxbury Park and Golf Course
- White Coppice & Great Hill
- Heskin Hall
- Healey Nab
- Leeds & Liverpool Canal
- Rivington Pike
- Winter Hill
- Worden Park
- Yarrow Valley Country Park

== Twin towns ==
Chorley is twinned with:

- Székesfehérvár, Hungary (1992)
- Lanzhou, China (2000)

== Notable residents ==
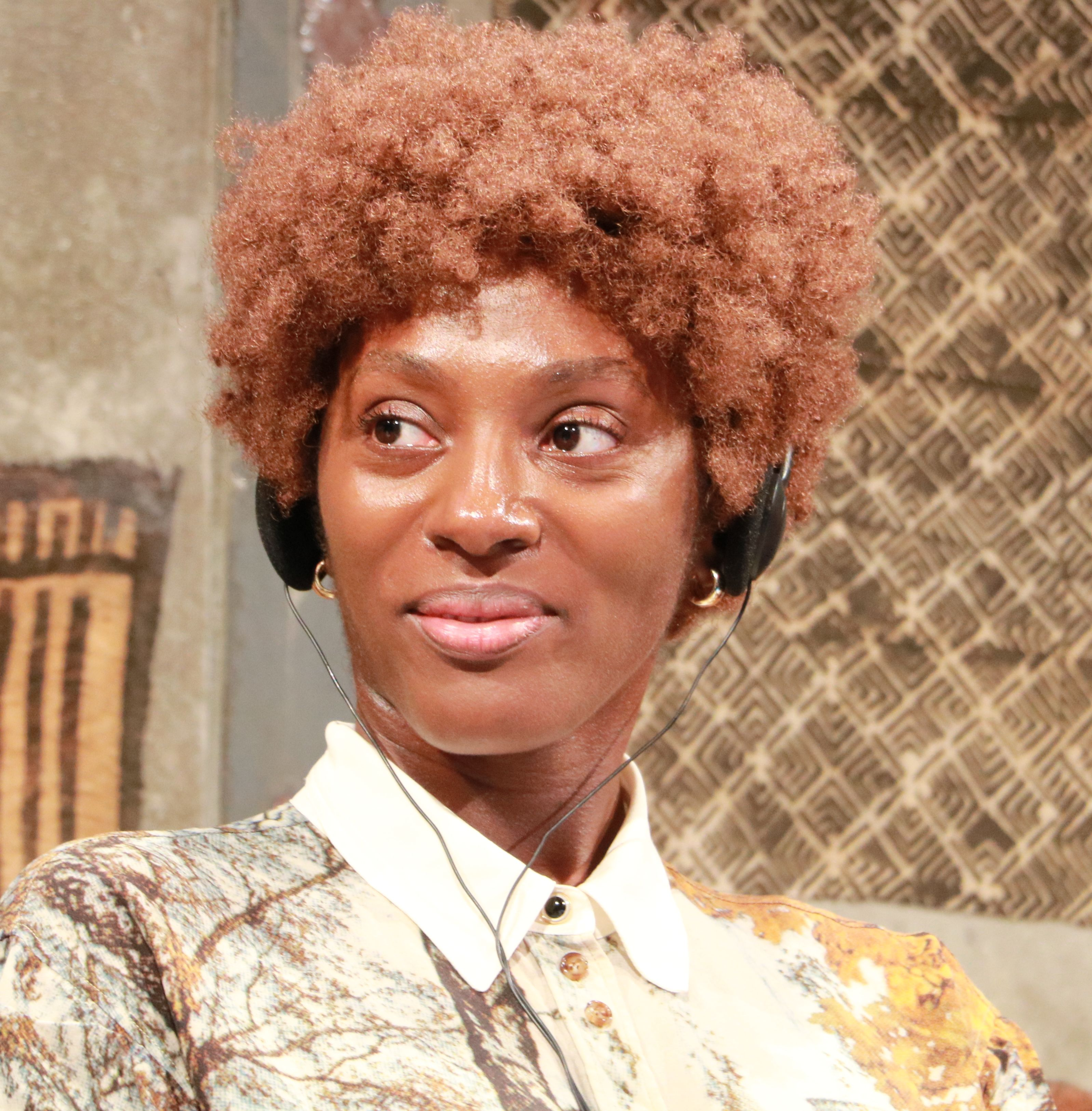
Yrsa Daley-Ward, 2024

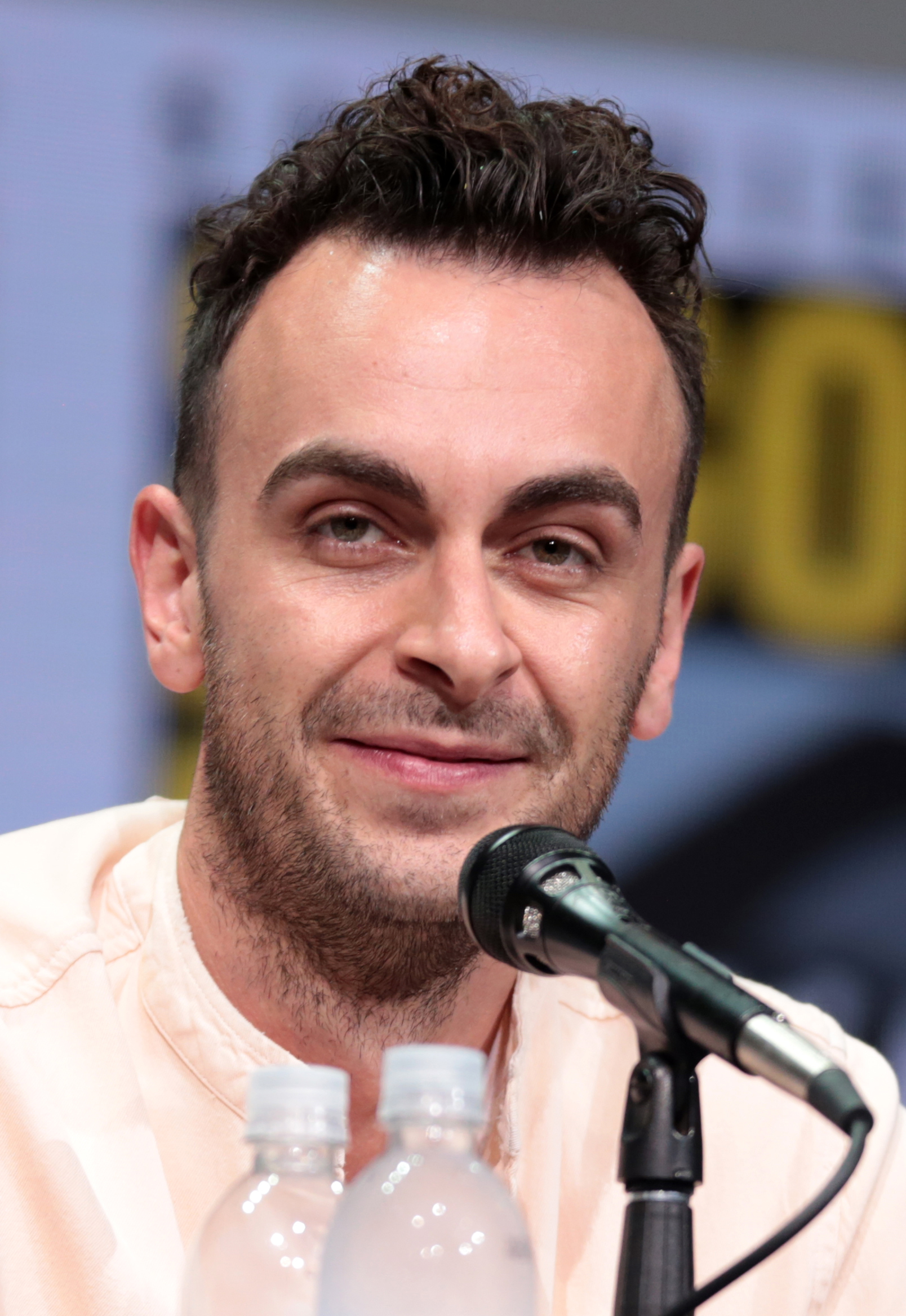
Joseph Gilgun, 2017

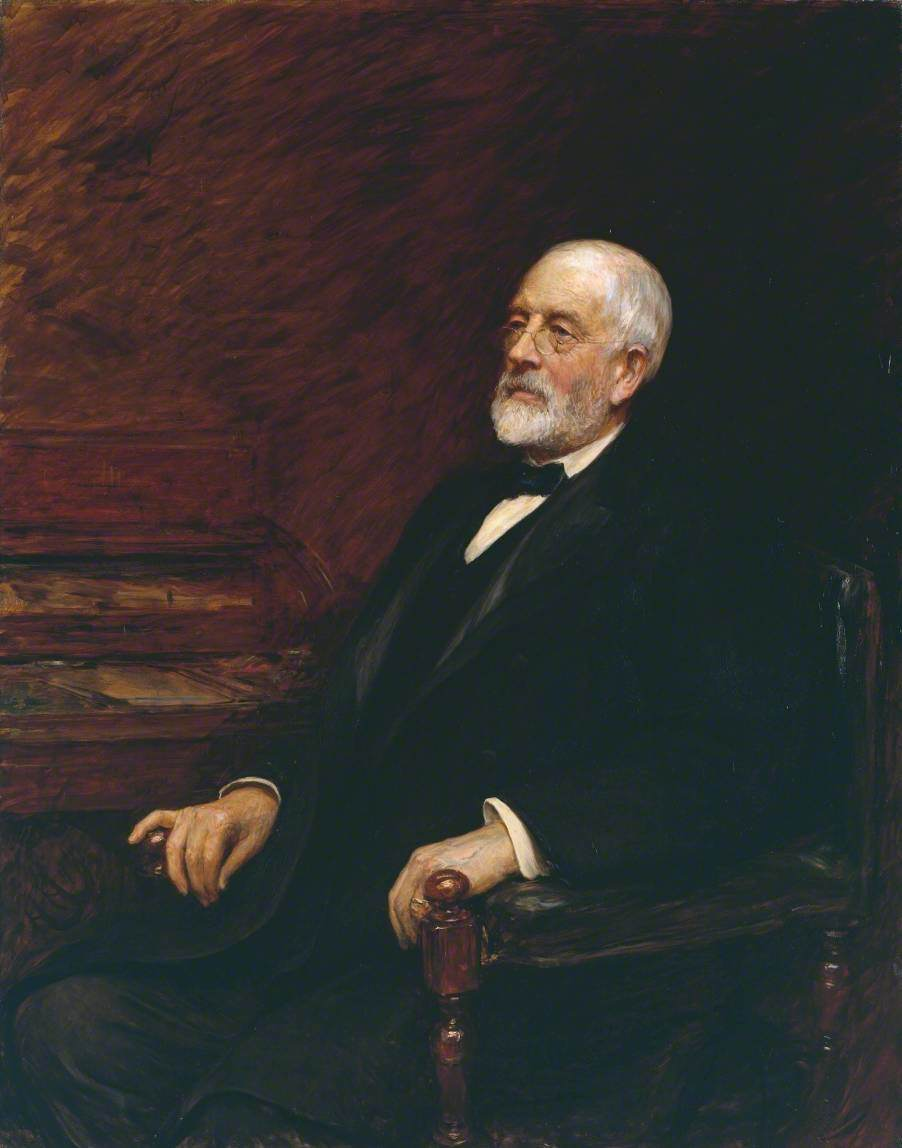
Sir Henry Tate, 1897

- Loui Batley (born 1987), actress and singer, played Sarah Barnes in the Channel 4 soap opera Hollyoaks
- Walter Berg (born 1947), astrologer, designed a system of a 13-sign sidereal astrology
- Blackhaine (born 1990), experimental rapper
- Kirsty Brimelow (born 1969), senior barrister, now a Deputy High Court Judge.
- Leonora Carrington (1917–2011), surrealist painter and novelist, mainly lived in Mexico City
- Pauline Clare (born 1947), police officer, first woman to be appointed Chief Constable of a police force in the United Kingdom
- John Clayton (1754–1843), minister with conservative social views, known after the Priestley Riots.
- Phil Cool (born 1948), comedian, impressionist and musician, had his own TV series Cool It (1985–1990),
- Yrsa Daley-Ward (born 1989), writer, model and actor.
- C. D. Darlington (1903–1981), biologist, cytologist, geneticist and eugenicist.
- Derek Draper (1967–2024), political lobbyist and psychotherapist
- Air Marshal Harold "Gus" Edwards, (1892–1952), helped build the Royal Canadian Air Force
- John Foxx (born 1948), singer, musician, artist, photographer, graphic designer and writer
- Joseph Gilgun (born 1984), actor, played Jamie Armstrong in Coronation Street & Eli Dingle in Emmerdale
- James Hatton Hall (1866–1945), English planter in Borneo and soldier
- Sir Walter Norman Haworth (1883–1950), chemist, worked on ascorbic acid (vitamin C) and shared the 1937 Nobel Prize in Chemistry
- Trevor Hemmings (1935–2021), housebuilding businessman
- Lindsay Hoyle (born 1957), MP for Chorley since 1997 and Speaker of the House of Commons since 2019
- Charles Lightoller (1874–1952), highest-ranking crew member to survive the sinking of the RMS Titanic
- William Mariner (1882–1916), rifleman, awarded the Victoria Cross at Cambrin in 1915
- Ken Morley (born 1943), actor, played Reg Holdsworth in the ITV soap opera Coronation Street
- Adam Nagaitis (born 1985), actor, played Caulker's Mate Cornelius Hickey in the AMC TV series The Terror
- Steve Pemberton (born 1967), comedian and director; co-writer and actor for BBC's The League of Gentlemen
- Esther Roper (1868–1938), suffragist and social justice campaigner for equal employment and voting rights for working-class women.
- Kevin Simm (born 1980), musician of Liberty X and Wet Wet Wet, winner of the 5th season of The Voice UK
- Myles Standish (c. 1584–1656), one of the leading founders of the Pilgrim Fathers.
- Starsailor (2000–2009 and 2014–present), alternative rock, post-Britpop pop group
- Tom Stephenson (1893–1987), journalist and champion of walkers' rights in rural areas
- Sir Henry Tate (1819–1899), born in White Coppice, sugar magnate and founder of the Tate Gallery, London
- Sir Holburt Waring, 1st Baronet (1866–1953), surgeon at St Bartholomew's Hospital, vice-chancellor of the University of London
- Rosemarie Wright (1931–2020), pianist, senior lecturer in keyboard studies at the Royal Northern College of Music 1972/78

=== Sport ===
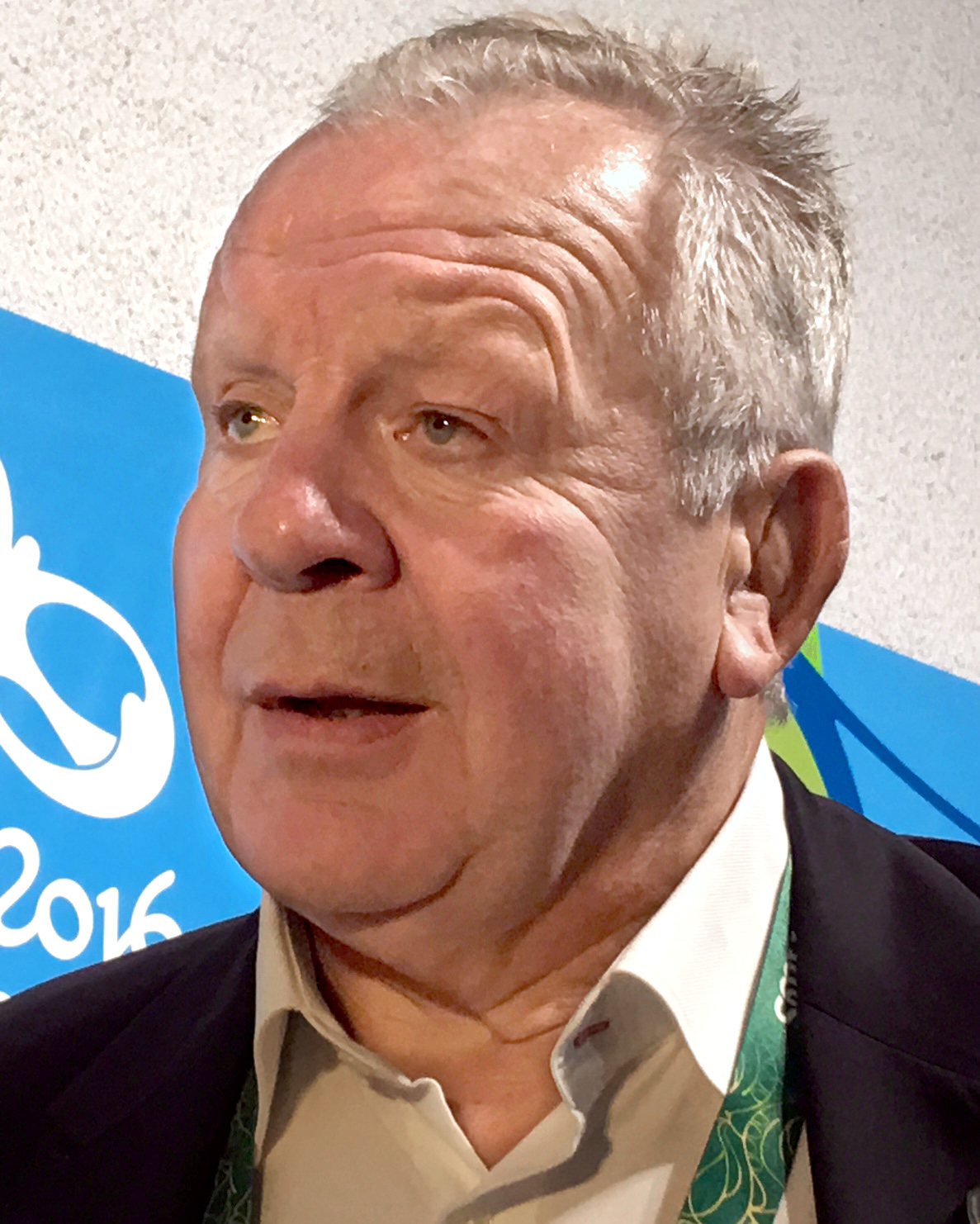
Bill Beaumont, 2016

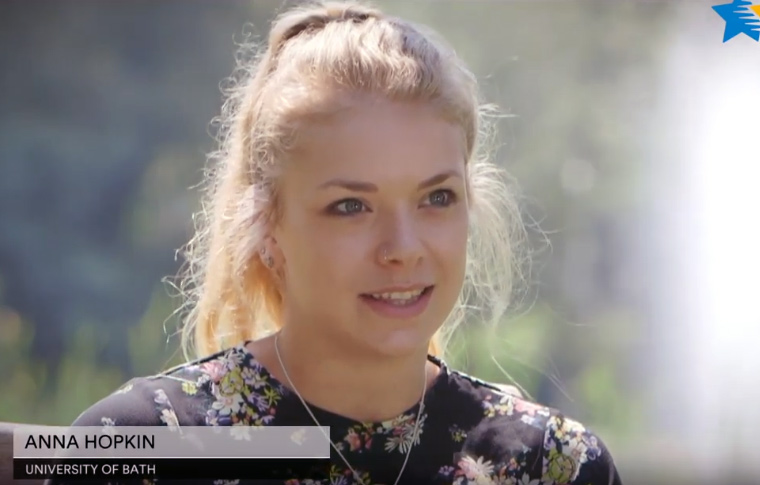
Anna Hopkin

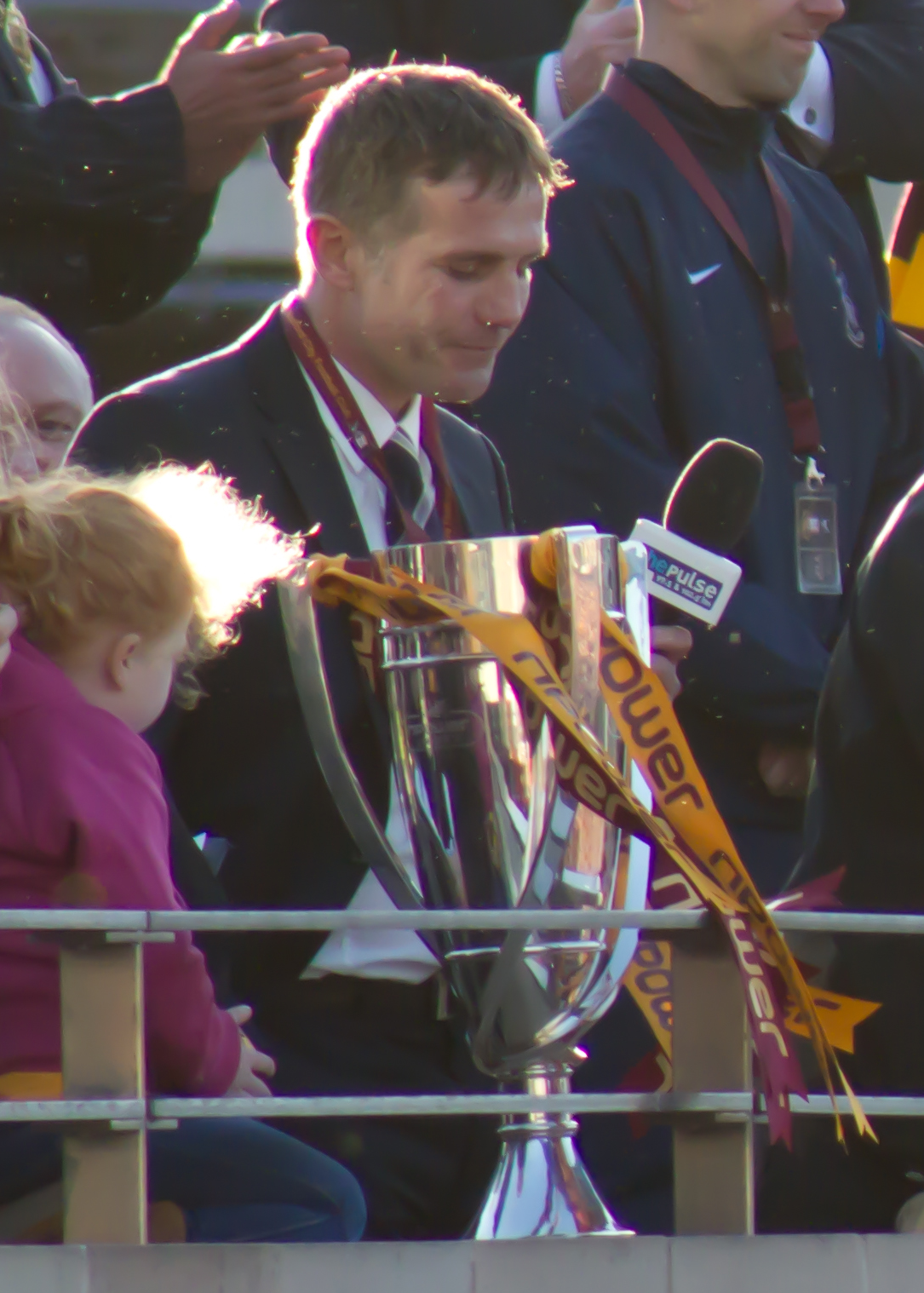
Phil Parkinson, 2013

- Graham Barrow (born 1954), footballer who played 533 games, manager of Wigan Athletic since 2023.
- Sir William Blackledge Beaumont (born 1952), former rugby union captain, played 34 international games
- Joe Blackledge (1928–2008), cricketer who played 26 first-class cricket games; uncle of Bill Beaumont
- Olivia Broome (born 2001), para powerlifter, bronze medallist at the 2020 and 2024 Summer Paralympics.
- Jack Catterall (born 1993), professional boxer, challenged for the undisputed light welterweight title in 2022
- Josh Charnley (born 1991), rugby league footballer, played 342 games and 8 for England
- Simon Farnworth (born 1963), football goalkeeper, played 442 games, 126 for Wigan Athletic, later a physiotherapist
- Simon Grand (born 1984), footballer who has played over 600 games, now with Bamber Bridge
- Paul Grayson (born 1971), rugby union player, played 259 games and 32 for England
- Adam Henley (born 1994), footballer, played 267 games, including 150 for Chorley
- Teddy Hodgson (1885–1919), played for 120 games for Burnley, FA Cup winners against Liverpool in 1914
- Anna Hopkin (born 1996), swimmer and gold medallist at the 2020 Summer Olympics in the Mixed 4 × 100 metre medley relay
- Conrad Hunte (1932–1999), former West Indies cricket team player, lived locally, played 44 test cricket matches
- Paul McKenna (born 1977), footballer, played 418 games for Preston North End
- Paul Mariner (1953–2021), footballer, played 555 games including 260 for Ipswich Town and 35 for England
- Jack Nelson (1906–1986), footballer who played for Luton Town, Preston North End and Wolverhampton Wanderers.
- Sheila Parker (born 1947), captain of the England women's national football team for whom she played 33 games
- Phil Parkinson (born 1967), footballer, played 506 games, now football manager for Wrexham
- Jason Queally (born 1970), cyclist, gold medallist at the 2000 Summer Olympics in Sydney
- Tom Smith (born 1985), cricketer, played 107 first-class cricket games
- Mark Tompsett (born 2006), paralympic swimmer, bronze medallist at the 2024 Summer Paralympics.
- David Unsworth (born 1973), footballer, played 449 games, including 304 for Everton where he later became U-23 manager
- Mickey Walsh (born 1954), footballer, played 360 games, including 180 for Blackpool and 21 for the Republic of Ireland
- Lisa Whiteside (born 1985), professional boxer who was a multi-time international medallist as an amateur
- Egerton Wright (1885–1918), an English cricketer and soldier who played 37 first-class cricket games

== See also ==
- Listed buildings in Chorley
