= Grain Pole Hill =

Hill in Lancashire, England

Coordinates: 53.65713°N 2.57041°W

- Location within Lancashire Location within the Borough of Chorley

Highest point
- Elevation: 285 m (935 ft)

Geography
- Location: Chorley, Lancashire, England
- OS grid: SD624180
- Topo map: OS Landranger 109

Grain Pole Hill is a location on Anglezarke Moor, near Chorley, within the West Pennine Moors of Lancashire, England. With a height of 285 metres (935 ft), the summit provides views towards the Irish Sea. It is located between Round Loaf and Pikestones, both of which are Neolithic remnants. Hurst Hill is less than half a mile away.
