= West Pennine Moors =

Area of the Pennines in north west England

Coordinates: 53.663°N 2.431°W

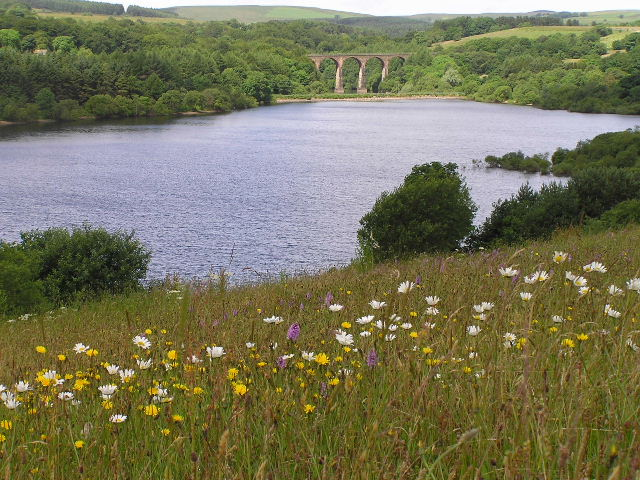
The Wayoh reservoir, viewed from the Edgworth side with the Entwistle viaduct in the background.

The West Pennine Moors is an area of the Pennines covering approximately 90 square miles (230 km^{2}) of moorland and reservoirs in Lancashire and Greater Manchester, England. It is a Site of Special Scientific Interest.

The West Pennine Moors are separated from the main Pennine range by the Irwell Valley to the east. The moorland includes Withnell, Anglezarke and Rivington Moors in the extreme west, Darwen and Turton Moors, Oswaldtwistle Moors and Holcombe Moors. These moors are lower in height than the main spine of the South Pennines. At 1,496 feet (456 m), the highest point is at Winter Hill. The area is of historical importance with archaeological evidence of human activity from Neolithic times. The area is close to urban areas, the dramatic backdrop to Bolton, Blackburn and Bury and neighbouring towns affording panoramic views across the Lancashire Plain and the Greater Manchester conurbation. The moorland is surrounded by the towns of Bolton, Chorley, Darwen, Horwich, Ramsbottom, Haslingden and Oswaldtwistle. Notable structures include Rivington Pike Tower, Winter Hill transmitting station, Peel Monument near Holcombe and the Jubilee Tower on Darwen Moor.

United Utilities owns around 40% of the land for water catchment. The company operates four information centres at Rivington, Jumbles Country Park, Roddlesworth and Haslingden Grane.

== History ==
=== Prehistoric ===
It is possible that Mesolithic hunting camps existed on the moors but evidence is rare. The area was then covered by forest which Neolithic and Bronze Age settlers began to clear. More forest was cleared by the Anglo-Saxons and Vikings. Place names such as clough, fell and moss suggest they were named by Norse settlers. Parts of the moorland were within the Royal Hunting Forests in the Middle Ages. The landscape continued to change as a result of enclosures in the middle of the 16th century.

Cheetham Close above Edgworth is the site of a destroyed Bronze Age megalith and is a scheduled ancient monument. On Anglezarke Moor are two prehistoric sites, Pikestones and Round Loaf, a landmark clearly visible from the route across Great Hill from White Coppice. A burial mound from about 1500 BC was discovered on Winter Hill around 0.5 km west of the summit. Another site, 1 km west of the summit, at Noon Hill Saucer Tumulus, is a burial site consisting of two concentric stonewalls which had two sets of burnt human bones, a broken urn containing more bones, two flint arrow heads and flint sacrificial knife in the centre. The site has been dated to around 1100 BC.

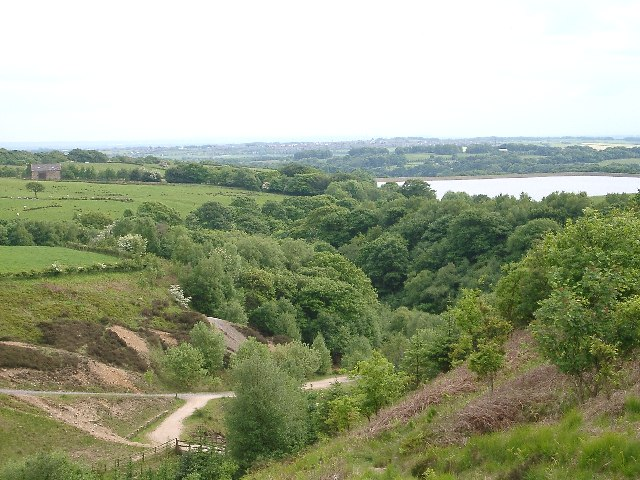
Lead Mines Clough

=== Modern ===
In 1690, lead was discovered in Lead Mines Clough at Anglezarke. The mines were expanded in the 1790s and copper and galena were also extracted. Witherite (barium carbonate) was discovered around 1700, and used as a glaze for porcelain. Stone was quarried at several sites including Anglezarke and used for building farmhouses, barns, mills and stone boundary walls. There were small coal mines on Winter Hill and Quarlton.

Belmont was the site of a bleaching and dyeing works, powered by water from Eagley Brook which powered mills along its valley. A reservoir was constructed, despite objections, requiring an Act of Parliament that stipulated two million gallons of water had to be released daily into Eagley Brook to sustain the industry that depended on it. Streams on the southern fringe of the moorland were utilised for water power and important for the bleaching and textile industries that grew up at Wallsuches, Horwich and Barrow Bridge.

Near the transmitter is Scotsman's Stump, an iron post with a plaque, a memorial to a Scottish salesman, George Henderson, who was shot on the moor by an unknown assailant in 1838. He was en route to a local inn to meet a friend but failed to arrive. His friend searched and found him fatally shot. A man was charged with the crime but not convicted.

A ranger on Winter Hill constructed two cairns on the moor to commemorate the alleged tragic death of two young men on the site many hundreds of years ago. Bolton Council demolished them claiming they were a safety hazard. He re-constructed them and successfully fought for them to remain. In the 1980s it was planned to excavate the site, but the plan was abandoned, so the truth behind the story is not known.

There have been two air disasters on the moors. Overlooking the valley near Lead Mines Clough is a war memorial commemorating the crew of an RAF Wellington bomber that crashed there in November 1943 during the Second World War. On 27 February 1958 a commercial flight from Ronaldsway Airport on the Isle of Man to Manchester Airport ended tragically on Winter Hill. The weather was atrocious and due to the poor visibility, heavy snow and remote location, only seven of the 42 people on board survived. The crash remains the area's worst air disaster. Plaques to commemorate this are mounted on the Arqiva Winter Hill building and at Ronaldsway Airport.

== Geology and geography ==
The underlying geology is the Millstone Grit series with sandstones and coarse gritstones separated by bands of shale. The area was covered by ice during the Ice Age and boulder clay deposited as the ice retreated. The rounded hill tops are millstone covered with shallow soil or peat above 400 metres. Lead, tin and coal have been mined in the area. Witherite was discovered at White Coppice.

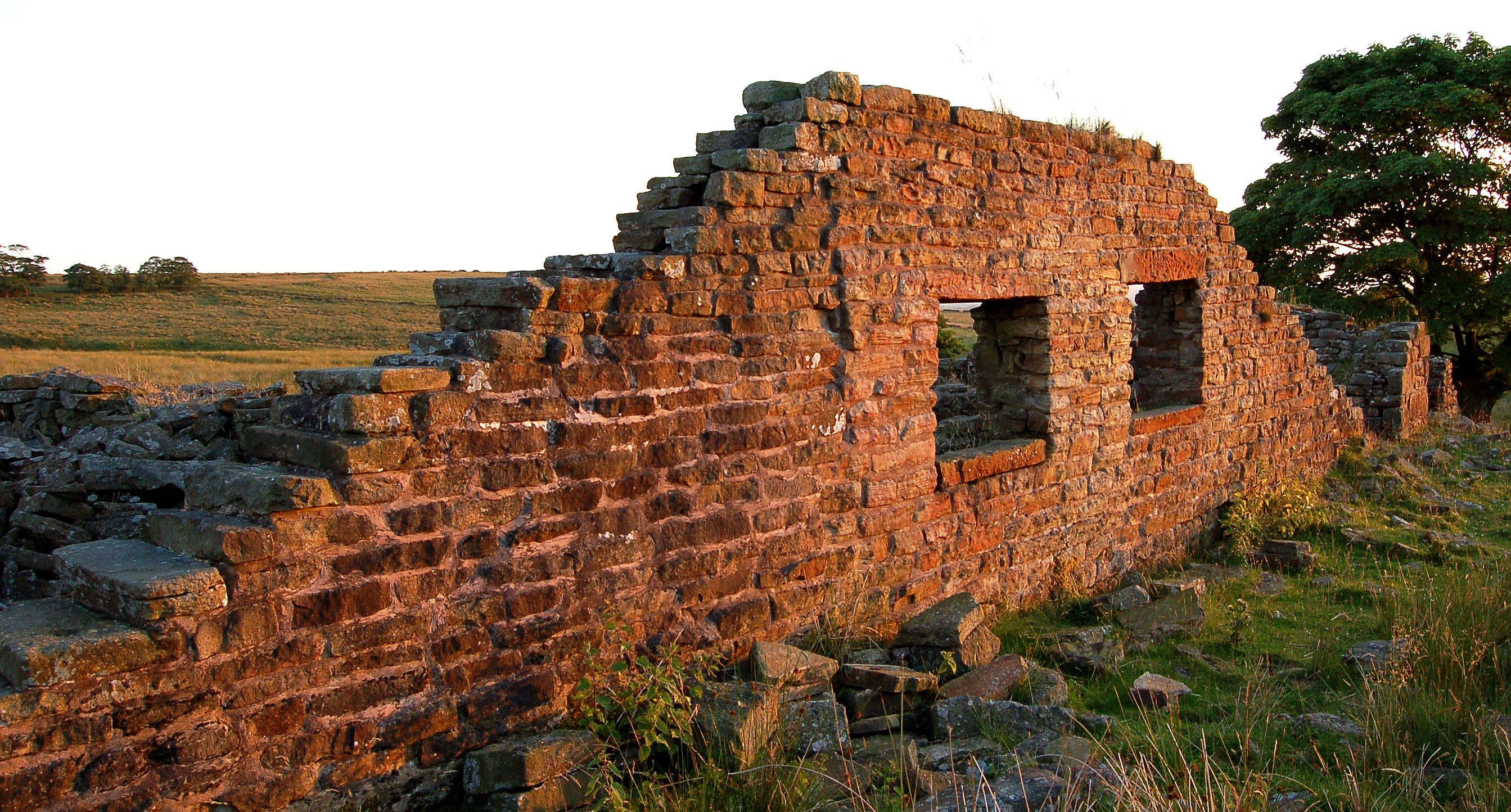
The moors are dotted with many ruins, such as Higher Hempshaw's

The rounded moorland hills of the West Pennine Moors are generally lower in height than the higher moorland plateaux of the main Pennine range to the east. There are gritstone crags and steep escarpments creating dramatic landforms with V-shaped valleys drained by fast-flowing streams. The highest peak is Winter Hill at 456 metres (1,496 ft). The moors are incised by wooded valleys and cloughs; the largest is in the Roddlesworth valley near Tockholes. There are small coniferous plantations, particularly around the reservoirs, but overall woodland cover is minimal.

The larger settlements are around the edges of the moors in the valleys, while the moors have scattered individual farmsteads built of local gritstone some of which have been abandoned or deserted. The predominant land use is for sheep farming. Unlike many areas of moorland in the north of England, the moors here are not managed for grouse shooting and consist largely of rough grassland and peat bog. There was a 50% loss of heather cover between 1946 and 1988.

== Reservoirs ==
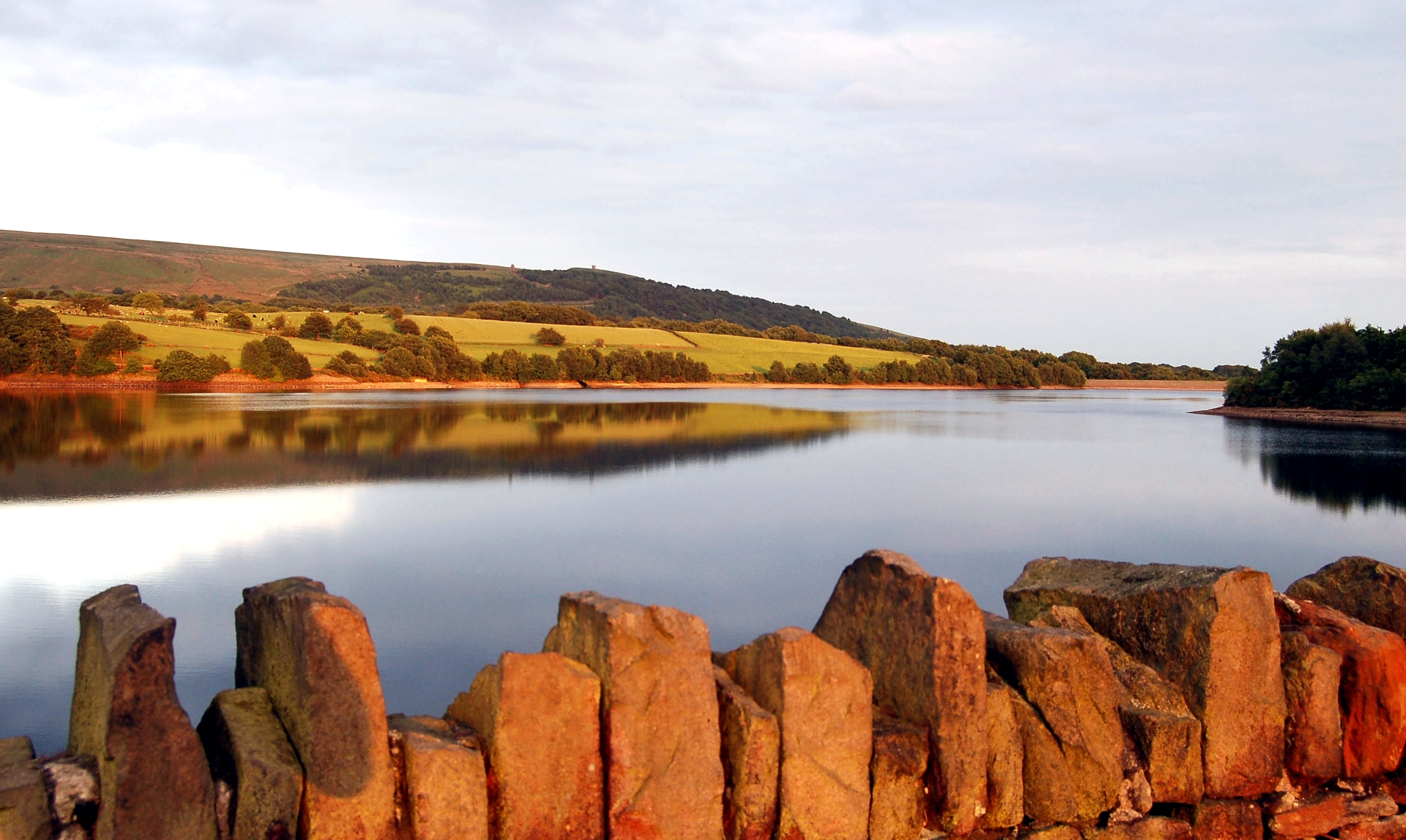
A view across Yarrow Reservoir, the newest of those built at Rivington

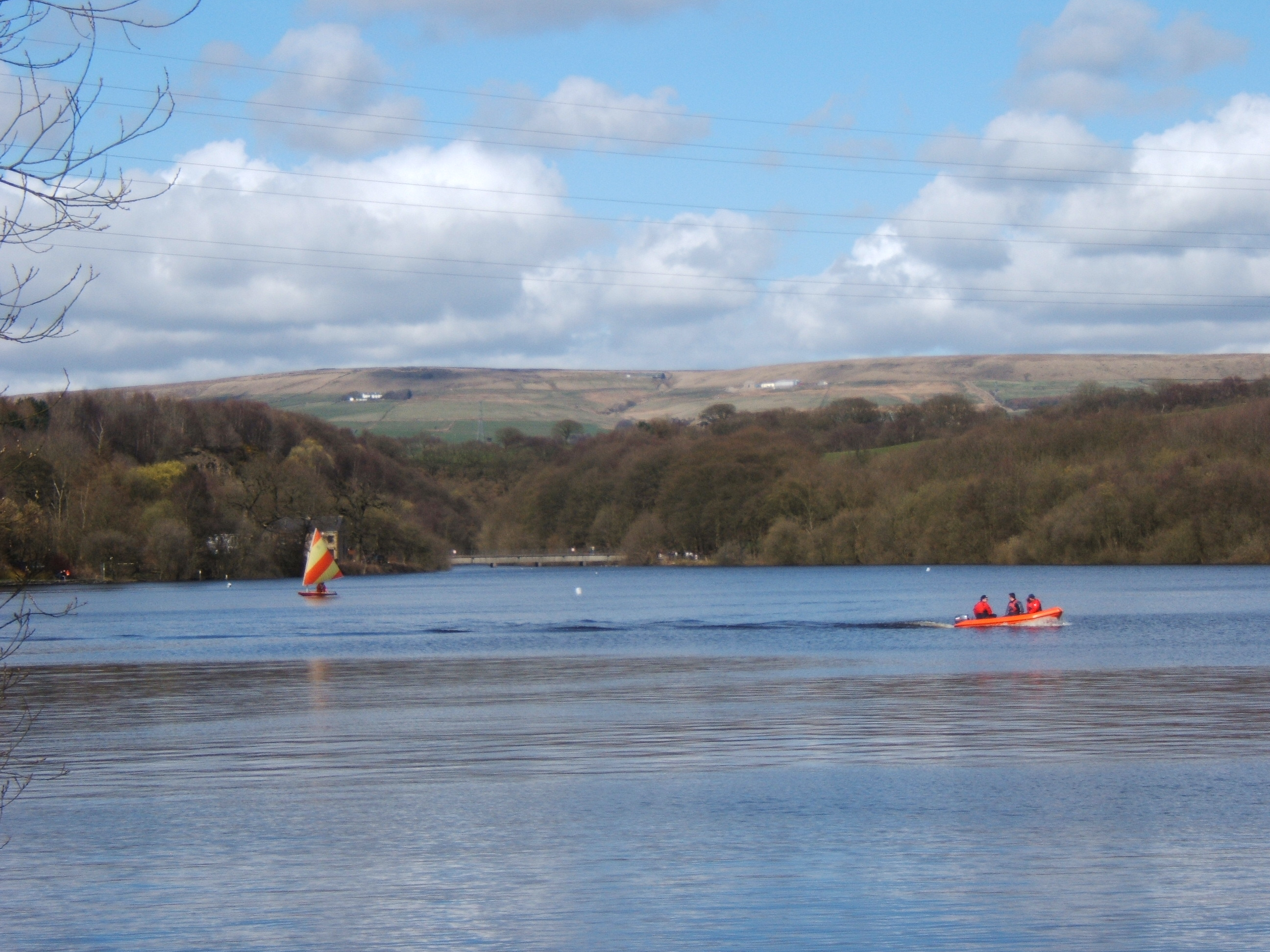
The Jumbles reservoir is the home of a sailing club.

Valleys on the moors were flooded in the mid-19th century to provide water first for local industry and later to guarantee clean water for the surrounding towns and Liverpool. There are several chains that contribute to the landscape and which provide opportunities for leisure and tourism.

The Anglezarke, Upper Rivington, Lower Rivington and Yarrow reservoirs were built to provide Liverpool with clean water. The 'Rivington Pike Scheme' was undertaken by Thomas Hawksley between 1850 and 1857 to construct five reservoirs. Water from two higher-level reservoirs, Rake Brook and Lower Ruddlesworth, was carried south in 'The Goit', a man-made channel through Heapey and White Coppice connecting them to the reservoirs. The scheme was expanded in 1856 to include High Bullough Reservoir, built in 1850 supplying water to Chorley. The Upper Roddlesworth Reservoir was built in 1867–75. Yarrow Reservoir was begun in 1867 and designed by Thomas Duncan, the Liverpool Borough Engineer.

The Rivington watershed comprises 10,000 acres (40 km^{2}) of land and the average flow rate through the filter beds at Horwich is 8.96 million litres/day (2.24 million gallons/day).

To the east of the area can be found the separate chains of Belmont, Delph, Turton and Entwistle, Wayoh and Jumbles reservoirs.

Situated in the northeast is Haslingden Grane, a glaciated valley with three reservoirs, Calf Hey, Ogden and Holden Wood. There is a car park and information centre at Clough Head.

== Access land ==
In 1896, a mass trespass took place on the moors following the sale of land to Colonel Ainsworth for shooting. He tried to prevent members of the public from using the public rights of way. Reports claim a crowd of 10,000 people gathered to be confronted by a barrier and the police, but the crowd literally threw the police officers over the fence and proceeded to march across the land. A large amount of open moorland has been made accessible due to the Countryside and Rights of Way Act 2000 giving walkers the right to roam over the moorland. Much of this area is boggy and makes for difficult walking.

The area around High Bullough reservoir is a nature reserve on the Anglezarke trail. Mountain biking has become popular since 2002, when the area was the setting for the biking events of the 2002 Commonwealth Games.

In March 2020, the West Pennine Moors SSSI was on fire during the Coronavirus lock down, presumably due to a barbecue.

== Landmarks ==
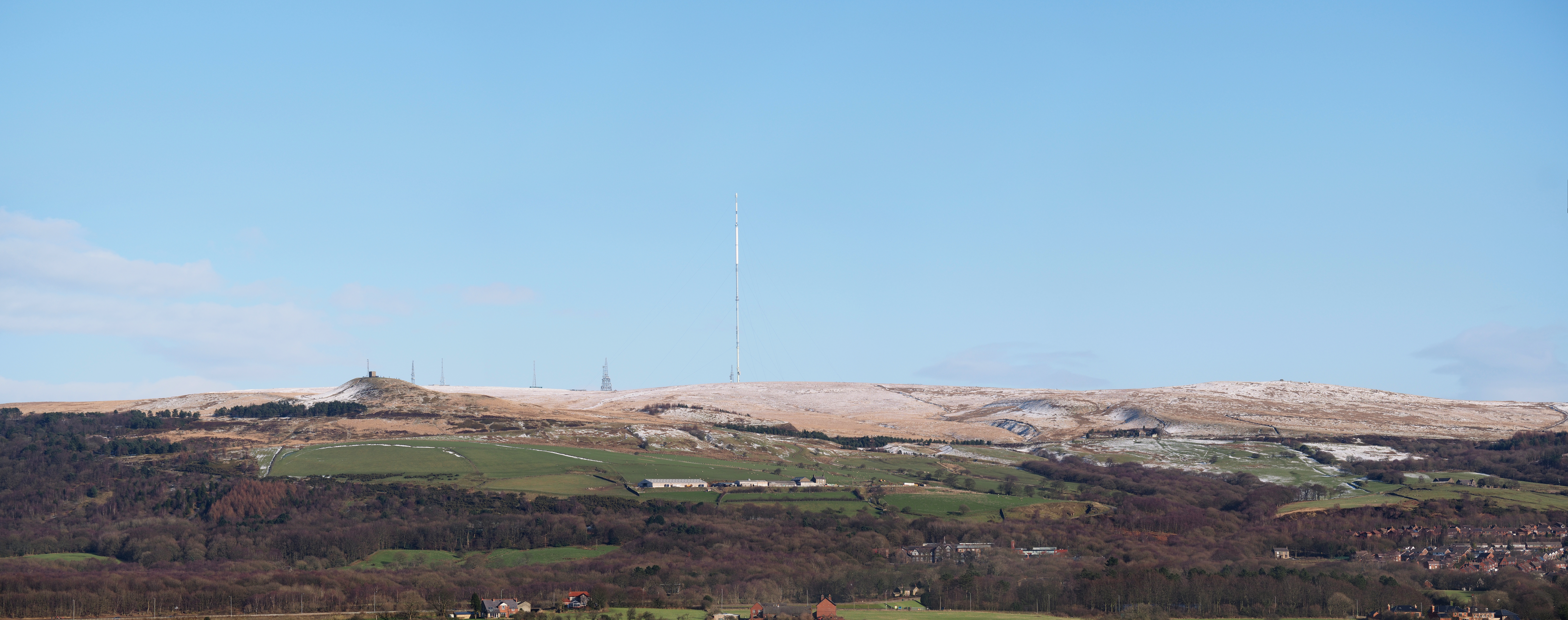
Panorama of Winter Hill from the west

The main mast at Winter Hill transmitting station on Winter Hill extends to a height of 1,014 feet (309 m) and is owned by Arqiva. It carries analogue and digital radio transmissions and digital television transmissions of BBC TV, ITV, Channel 4, Channel 5, FREEVIEW, BBC radio and commercial radio services. This mast serves the North West region.

Most other masts and towers on the site are for mobile phones base stations, emergency services communications and PMR services and various microwave links.

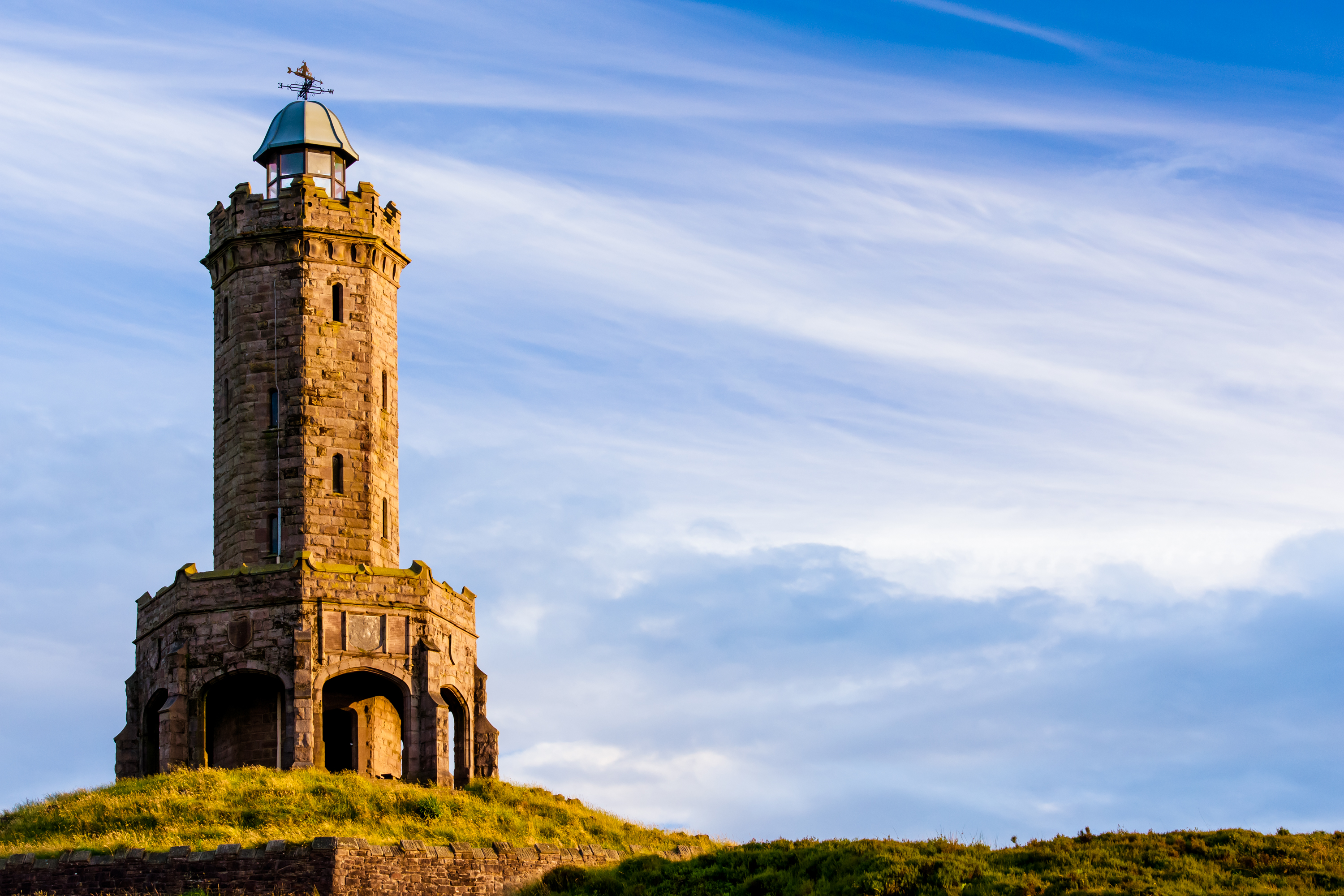
Jubilee Tower, Darwen

Due to its prominent position, Rivington Pike was used as a beacon on 19 July 1588, when it was lit to warn the population that the Spanish Armada had been sighted off The Lizard in Cornwall. A beacon was lit to mark the end of the Great War in 1918, the coronations of George V and Elizabeth II and the Royal wedding in 1981. The tower on top of the Pike was built as a shelter commissioned by John Andrews of Rivington Hall in 1733. It fell out of use when the estate was bought by William Lever in 1900. It is a Grade-II-listed building.

The octagonal Jubilee Tower on Darwen Hill overlooking the town of Darwen was completed in 1898 to commemorate Queen Victoria's Diamond Jubilee and to celebrate the victory of the local people for the right to access the moor. The tower is often referred to as "Darwen Tower". It is 85 ft (26 m) in height, and there is access to the top via the internal staircase from where Yorkshire, Morecambe Bay, Lancashire, Cumbria, and surrounding moorland can be seen. On rare occasions, in favourable weather conditions, it is possible see the Isle of Man to the northwest.

The Peel Tower stands on Holcombe Hill as a memorial to the former Prime Minister. It is visible from miles around and its 148 steps can be climbed when the tower is open.

== Wildlife and habitats ==
The West Pennine Moors and surrounding farmland have a rich and often undervalued level of biodiversity.

On the unenclosed moorland, there are extensive areas of blanket bog on deep peat soils. Although much modified by grazing, burning and drainage, and in places dominated by purple moor-grass, characteristic species such as cotton-grass, heather, cross-leaved heath, cranberry and many species of sphagnum moss are well represented along with restricted plants such as bog rosemary. Elsewhere on the moorland there are areas of upland heath, acid grassland and upland flushes. Moorland birds include peregrine falcon, merlin, dunlin, wheatear, short-eared owl and golden plover. The moorlands of the West Pennine Moors have largely escaped the extensive planting of conifers suffered in some other parts of the northern uplands.

At lower altitudes, the landscape is characterised by pasture and meadows enclosed by dry stone walls. Species-rich grassland is now restricted in both area and distribution, mostly to steeper valleys or cloughs where there are also some species-rich flushes, such as those at Oak Field SSSI. Some of the more improved pastures still retain populations of breeding wading birds such as Peewit or northern lapwing, snipe and curlew, and particularly in the fields and margins around Belmont Reservoir there are oystercatcher, redshank and common sandpiper. The Reservoir itself has nationally important populations of black-headed and Mediterranean gulls.

Native broad-leaved woodland is also a habitat restricted almost entirely to valleys (cloughs), though there are examples of upland oak woodland, ash woodland and wet woodland dominated by alder and/or willow, such as at Longworth Clough SSSI. Along many of the reservoir valleys there are extensive areas of broad-leaved and conifer plantation such as around Roddlesworth Reservoir and Turton and Entwistle Reservoirs.
