= Black Brook (Chorley) =

River in Lancashire, England

Coordinates: 53.667°N 2.538°W

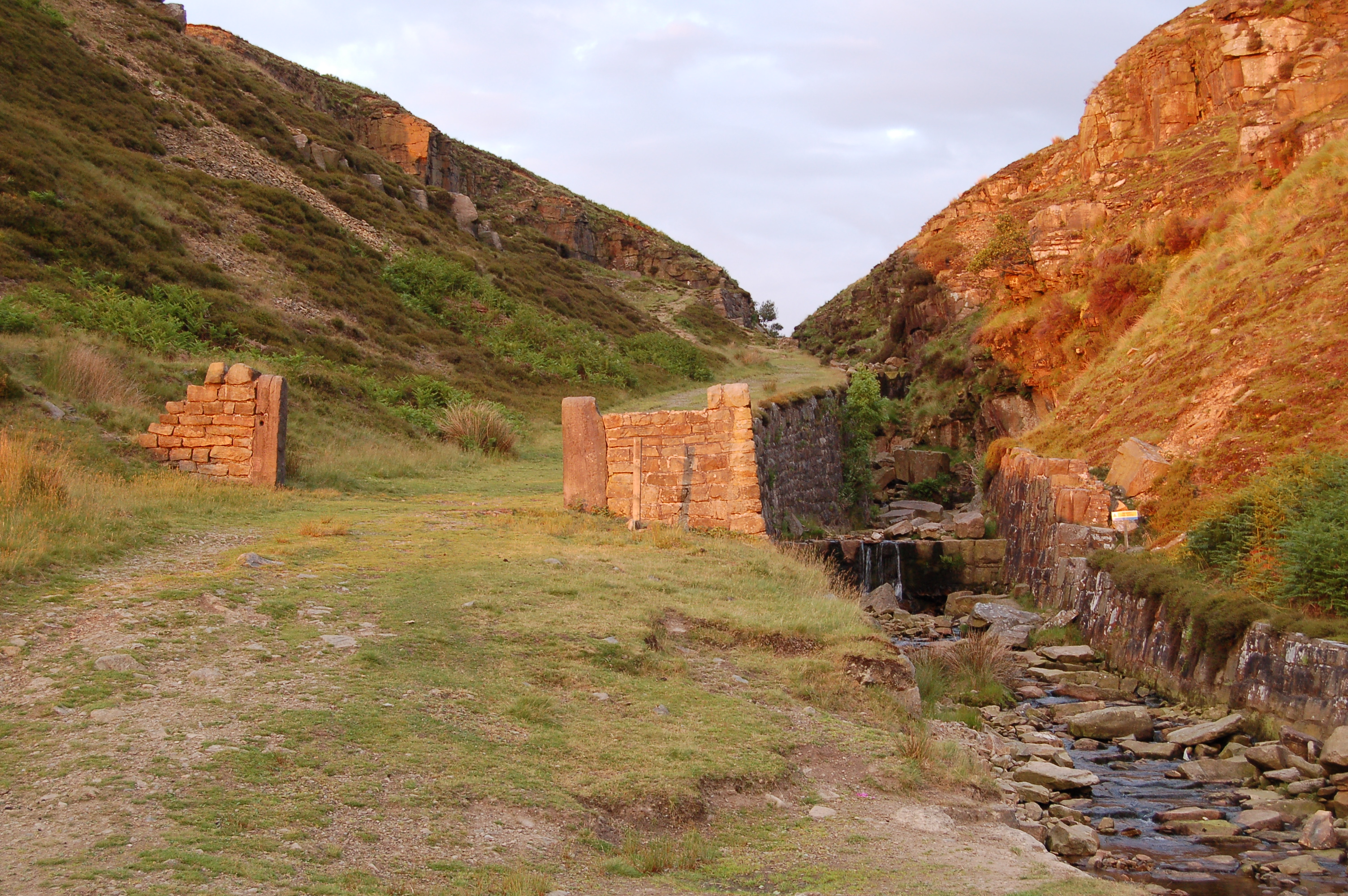
Black Brook at White Coppice

Black Brook in Lancashire has its source at Great Hill in the West Pennine Moors. The water is acidic due to a high level of peat in the uplands near to Round Loaf, giving the brook its brown colour. The young river was known as Warth Brook in olden Heapey. A feeder stream also known as Black Brook joins near Kittiwake Road - this short and weak water course commences at Eagle Tower. The jointed brook feeds Anglezarke Reservoir, and joins the River Yarrow in lowland Chorley at Yarrow Bridge. The entire course of Black Brook and the River Yarrow fall within Chorley and its villages.

== History ==
Black Brook powered a water mill at Leicester Mill, White Coppice, from which Leicester Mill Quarries gained their name.

== Wildlife ==
After suffering many years of pollution due to effluent discharge from Whitter's Factory, and Stanley's Factory, the river is now much cleaner, and as such has attracted birds such as dipper, grey wagtail and kingfisher, and fish including trout, chub, dace and barbel.
