= Hurst Hill =

Hill in Lancashire, England

Coordinates: 53.65628°N 2.56132°W

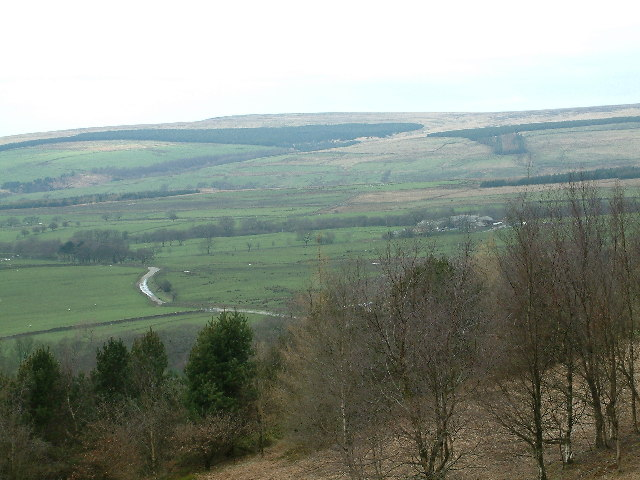

Highest point
- Elevation: 317 m (1,040 ft)

Geography
- Location within Lancashire Location within the Borough of Chorley
- Location: Chorley, Lancashire, England
- OS grid: SD630179
- Topo map: OS Landranger 109

Hurst Hill is a location on Anglezarke Moor, within the West Pennine Moors of Lancashire, England. With a height of 317 metres (1,040 feet), the summit provides views towards the Irish Sea. It is located between Round Loaf and Pikestones, both of which are Neolithic remnants. It is probable that Hurst Hill (and nearby Grain Pole Hill) were vantage points for the ancient communities. No excavation work has taken place.
