= Tot Walsh =

English footballer

Personal information
- Full name: Thomas Walsh
- Date of birth: 12 February 1900
- Place of birth: Bolton, Lancashire, England
- Date of death: 22 November 1950 (aged 50)
- Place of death: Hurst, Lancashire, England
- Height: 5 ft 7 in (1.70 m)
- Position: Centre forward

Senior career*
Years	Team	Apps	(Gls)
1920–1923	Bolton Wanderers	22	(4)
1923–1928	Bristol City	142	(88)
1928–19??	Crystal Palace	8	(1)
- Hurst
- Chorley
1929–1930	Mossley	2	(0)
- * Club domestic league appearances and goals

Thomas Walsh (12 February 1900 – 22 November 1950) was an English footballer who played as a centre forward.

== Career ==
Thomas "Tot" Walsh scored 77 goals in reserve team matches during three seasons at Bolton Wanderers. He joined Bristol City in January 1924. During his time with the club he recorded the most League Goals in a match for Bristol City with 6 scored against Gillingham in a Division 3 South match on 15 January 15, 1927. He was also the club's top scorer in both the 1925–26 season (25) and 1926–27 season (32).

Walsh moved on to Crystal Palace in May 1928 before returning to Lancashire where he played two games for Mossley in the 1929–30 season. He died in 1950.

== Honours ==
with Bristol City

- Football League Third Division South winner: 1926–27
