= Green Withins Brook =

River in Lancashire, England

Green Withins Brook in Lancashire, England, is a small tributary of the River Yarrow that runs from Standing Stones Hill on Anglezarke Moor, to the ruins of Simms.
