= Listed buildings in Anglezarke =

Anglezarke is a civil parish in the Borough of Chorley, Lancashire, England. It contains three buildings that are recorded in the National Heritage List for England as designated listed buildings, all of which are listed at Grade II. This grade is the lowest of the three gradings given to listed buildings and is applied to "buildings of national importance and special interest". The parish is entirely rural, and the listed buildings consist of a farmhouse, a barn, and a former gamekeeper's cottage, all of which date from the 17th and early 18th century.

== Buildings ==
Name and location	Photograph	Date	Notes
Manor House; 53.64984°N 2.57480°W		1604	A farmhouse that was extended in the 19th century. It is in sandstone with a slate roof, it has two storeys and a three-bay front, and an outshut at the rear. On the front is a single-storey gabled porch containing stone benches. Most of the windows are mullioned, some are also transomed, and there is a sash window in the right bay. The left side has a gable with a bargeboard, and it contains another porch.
Barn; 53.65365°N 2.58078°W	—	1686	A sandstone barn with s stone-slate roof, it has an L-shaped plan. It is in three bays, with an outshut at the rear and a lean-to extension to the right. The barn contains a central wagon entrance, ventilation slits, and a damaged doorway.
Gamekeeper's Cottage; 53.65365°N 2.57984°W		1707	Originating as a gamekeeper's cottage, it was enlarged and altered, later becoming a farmhouse and then a house. It is built in rendered sandstone with a slate roof. The house has two storeys in two original bays with a one bay extension in place of a former game and gun room on the right. Above the doorway is a lintel with a panel containing the date (1707), and to the right of this is a mullioned window.
