= Jumbles Country Park =

Park in Bradshaw, Greater Manchester, England

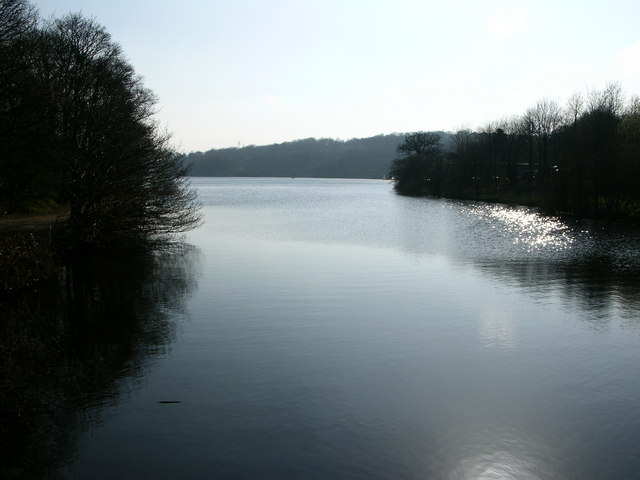
- Jumbles Reservoir
- Interactive map of Jumbles Country Park
- Location: Bradshaw, Bolton, Greater Manchester
- Nearest city: Manchester
- Coordinates: 53°37′31″N 2°24′09″W
- Created: 1971
- Operator: United Utilities

Jumbles Country Park is a country park in Bolton, Greater Manchester. It lies on the southern edge of the West Pennine Moors. It was opened on 11 March 1971 by Queen Elizabeth II. The park is now owned and managed by United Utilities.
