= Anglezarke =

Civil parish in Lancashire, England

Coordinates: 53.649°N 2.574°W

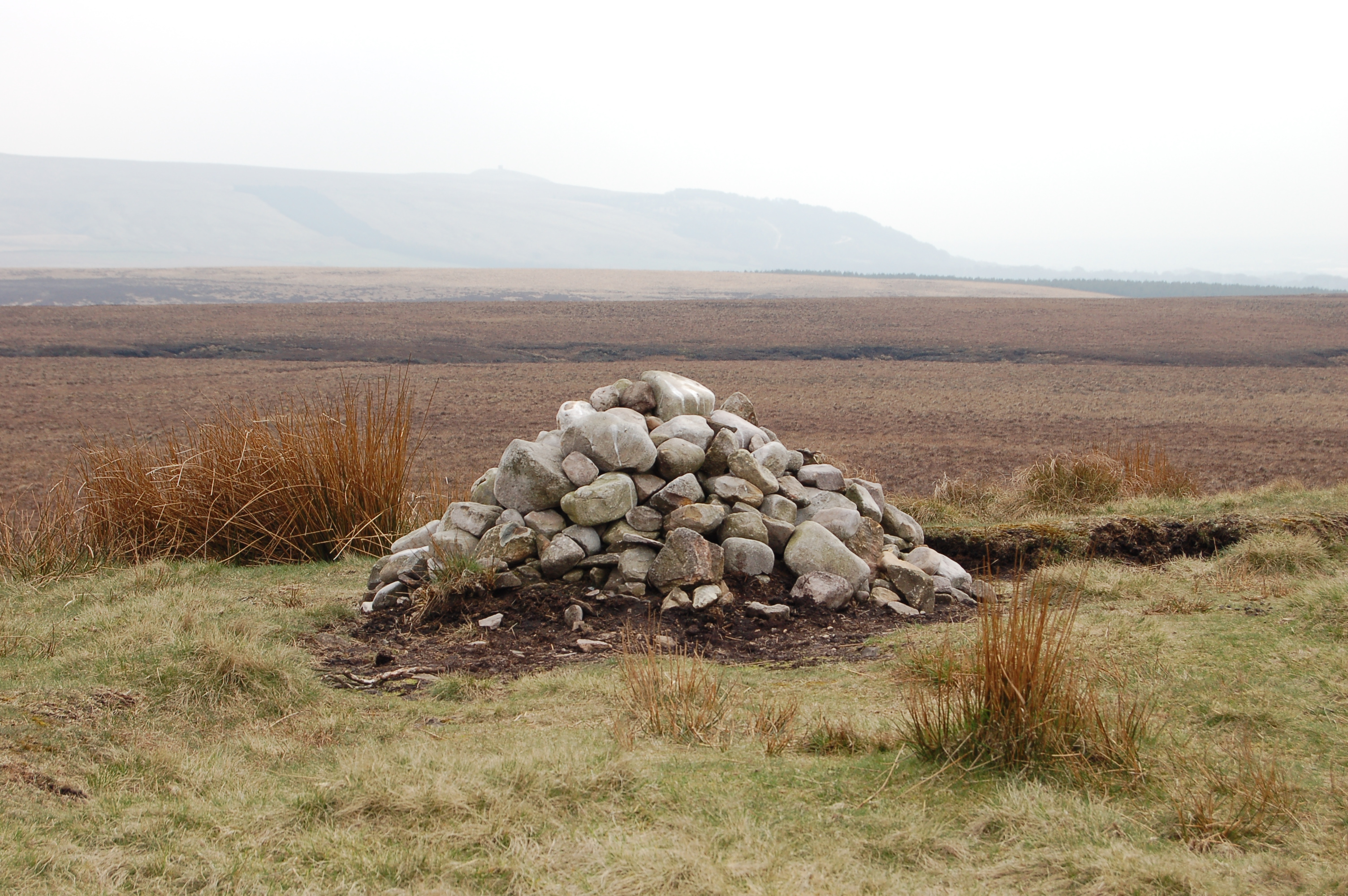
- The cairn on Round Loaf on Anglezarke Moor, looking towards Winter Hill

- Shown within Chorley Borough Location within Lancashire
- Population: 23 (2021)
- OS grid reference: SD621171
- Civil parish: Anglezarke
- District: Chorley
- Shire county: Lancashire
- Region: North West
- Country: England
- Sovereign state: United Kingdom
- Post town: CHORLEY
- Postcode district: PR6
- Dialling code: 01257
- Police: Lancashire
- Fire: Lancashire
- Ambulance: North West
- UK Parliament: Chorley

Anglezarke is a sparsely populated civil parish in the Borough of Chorley in Lancashire, England. It is an agricultural area used for sheep farming and is also the site of reservoirs that were built to supply water to Liverpool. The area has a large expanse of moorland with many public footpaths and bridleways. The area is popular with walkers and tourists; it lies in the West Pennine Moors in Lancashire, sandwiched between the moors of Withnell and Rivington, and is close to the towns of Chorley, Horwich and Darwen. At the 2001 census it had a population of 23, but at the 2011 census the population was included within Heapey civil parish. In 2021 Census it had a population of 23. The area was subjected to depopulation after the reservoirs were built.

== Toponymy ==
Anglezarke is derived from the Old Norse name Anlaf and the Old Norse erg, a 'hill pasture or shieling'. The elements together mean 'Anlaf's hill pasture'. In 1202 it was recorded as 'Andelevesarewe'. By 1225, this had become 'Anlavesargh'. In a deed of 1270, three variations were used: 'Arlawesarwe', 'Anlasargh' and 'Anlezark'. By 1559, 'Anlazarghe' was more common.

== History ==
=== Archaeological sites ===
Human activity around Anglezarke can be traced to pre-historic times. Rushey Brow on Anglezarke Moor has a site of special archaeological interest. Evidence is present of a working floor from shelters in the Mesolithic period and flint implements found, dated to 8th millennium BC.

Pikestones, a Neolithic chambered cairn, the only one in Lancashire, has an internal burial chamber with evidence of the original entrance and Round Loaf, a Neolithic to late-Bronze Age tumulus which can be seen from the route across Great Hill from White Coppice are scheduled monuments on Anglezarke Moor.

=== Manor ===
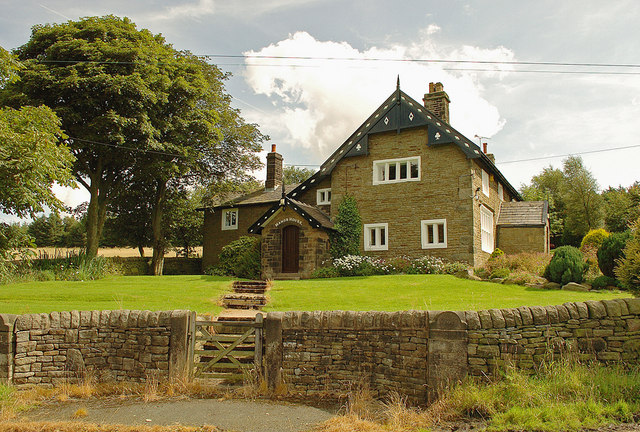
Manor House

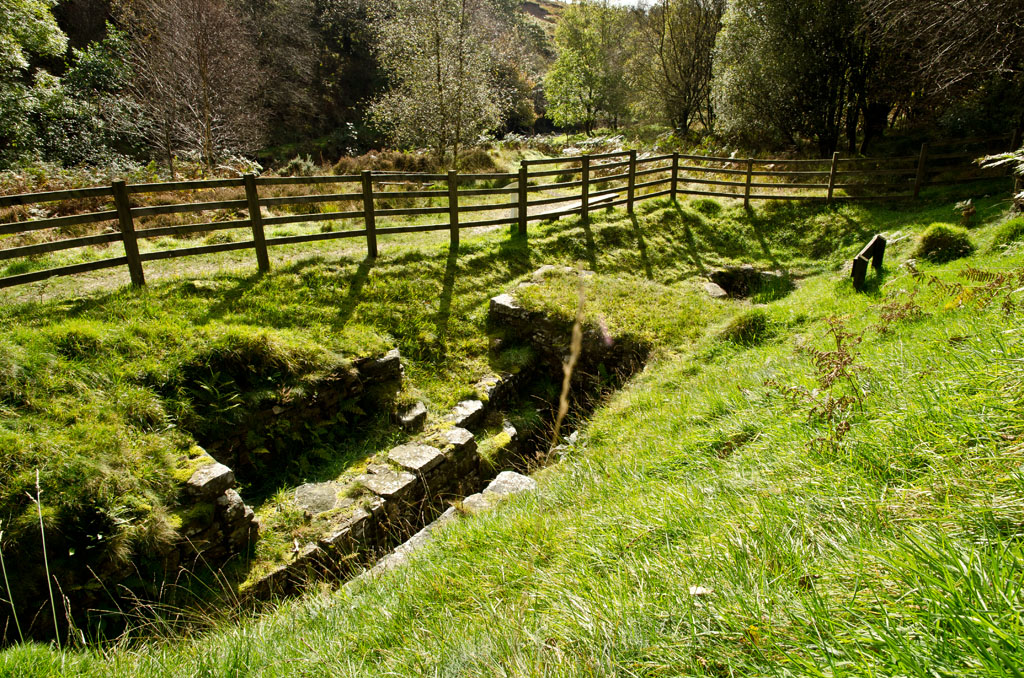
Lead Mines Clough, remains of water wheel and pump shaft

Anglezarke was dependent on the barony of Manchester. Albert Grelley gave two oxgangs of land to Robert de Lathom for an annual rent of 3 shillings. Between 1230 and 1264, Robert son of Richard, Lord of Lathom, granted his land known as 'Swinlehehurst' to Burscough Priory. In 1270 Lord Robert de Lathom and Peter de Hepay were in dispute concerning a structure in the common land. In 1339 Edward III granted free warren in Anglezarke to Thomas de Lathum. In 1298 Sir Robert Fitzhenry, Lord of Lathom gifted land as perpetual alms to Burscough Priory who earned income from rents, a confirmation charter was granted by Henry V in 1422. The Knights Hospitallers held land at Anglezarke. In 1406 John of Stanley Kt granted Anglezarke and its commons held in feoffment of William of Fulthorp Kt to Edward of Lathom senior in exchange for 1,000 marks. Anglezarke was joined with Rivington, Hempshaws and Foulds through the founding of the Rivington Church and school by royal charter in 1566.

Records are preserved at Lancashire Records Office of the court baron of the Manor of Anglezarke.

In 1600, William Stanley, 6th Earl of Derby Edward Rigbye, Thomas Ireland and Michaell Doughtye of Lathom, sold the manor to London merchant, Frances Mosseley and Edward Mosseley of Grays Inn for £400. There was an assignment of the manor of Anlazarghe by Richard Chorlton of Wythington, yeoman, to Richard Banyster of Brightmeate and Asheton Nuttall of Farnworth, gents in 1602, the indenture references earlier documents showing possession by the Earls of Derby and Earl of Northumberland. Other documents show the Earl purchased former church land from the government after dissolution of the monasteries.

In the 17th century, the Standishes purchased rights to the manor. In 1693 Dame Margaret Standish and her son Sir Thomas petitioned the House of Lords against Hugh Willoughby, 12th Baron Willoughby of Parham for the redemption of a mortgage on the manor and lead mines.

In 1721, Sir Thomas Standish leased common land near White and Black Coppice to Sir Henry Hoghton of Hoghton Tower for 21 years. Sir Richard Standish's descendants had inherited an interest in the manor from 1677, until in 1812, when the line came to an end. The extent of the Standish interests is illustrated in a large coloured map produced in 1774 for Sir Frank Standish by George Lang.

The manor next passed to a distant cousin, Frank Hall, who assumed the name Standish and died without issue in 1840.

Tithe records of 1850 show all land on which rent was due was to be paid to the Earl of Bradford. The tithes due from leases owned by William Standish at Anglezarke were for 88 acres 3 roods and 31 perches of meadow and other land and buildings with sub leases to various parties. Other landowners were the heirs of the Shaw family being Edmund Cunliffe and John Grundy, tithes 11 Great Meadow and 21 kitchen meadow at Jepsons, occupied by William Berry. Richard Rainshaw Rothwell of Sharples owned freehold on meadow at tithe 12, occupied by Mary Pilkington of Stones House. Richard Willis owned meadow land at tithes 13 and 14, occupiers were Thomas Pilkington of meadow now under the reservoir and Isabella Clayton at long meadow near Brook House. Meadow at Lester Mill, tithe 1, now under the reservoir, was occupied and farmed by Roger Gerrard, alongside Mary Pilkington and her family, who are recorded at the old Lester Mill on the 1841 census. Properties at Anglezarke benefitted from rights in common on the moorland.

Percival Sumner Mayhew bought the Standish share in 1898 and held rights to shoot game at the common near White and Black Coppice during his lifetime. At the turn of the 20th century Liverpool Corporation acquired a large part of the land to protect the Rivington water supply and many properties were demolished, leaving only one or two working farms.

The Manor House, now a Grade II Listed building, was formerly known as High Bullough, the name is derived from the family name of Bullough. It has a 1604 date stone and other stones inscribed "RS", "W S" and "WL 1778".

=== Agricultural Heritage ===
==== Landmarks ====
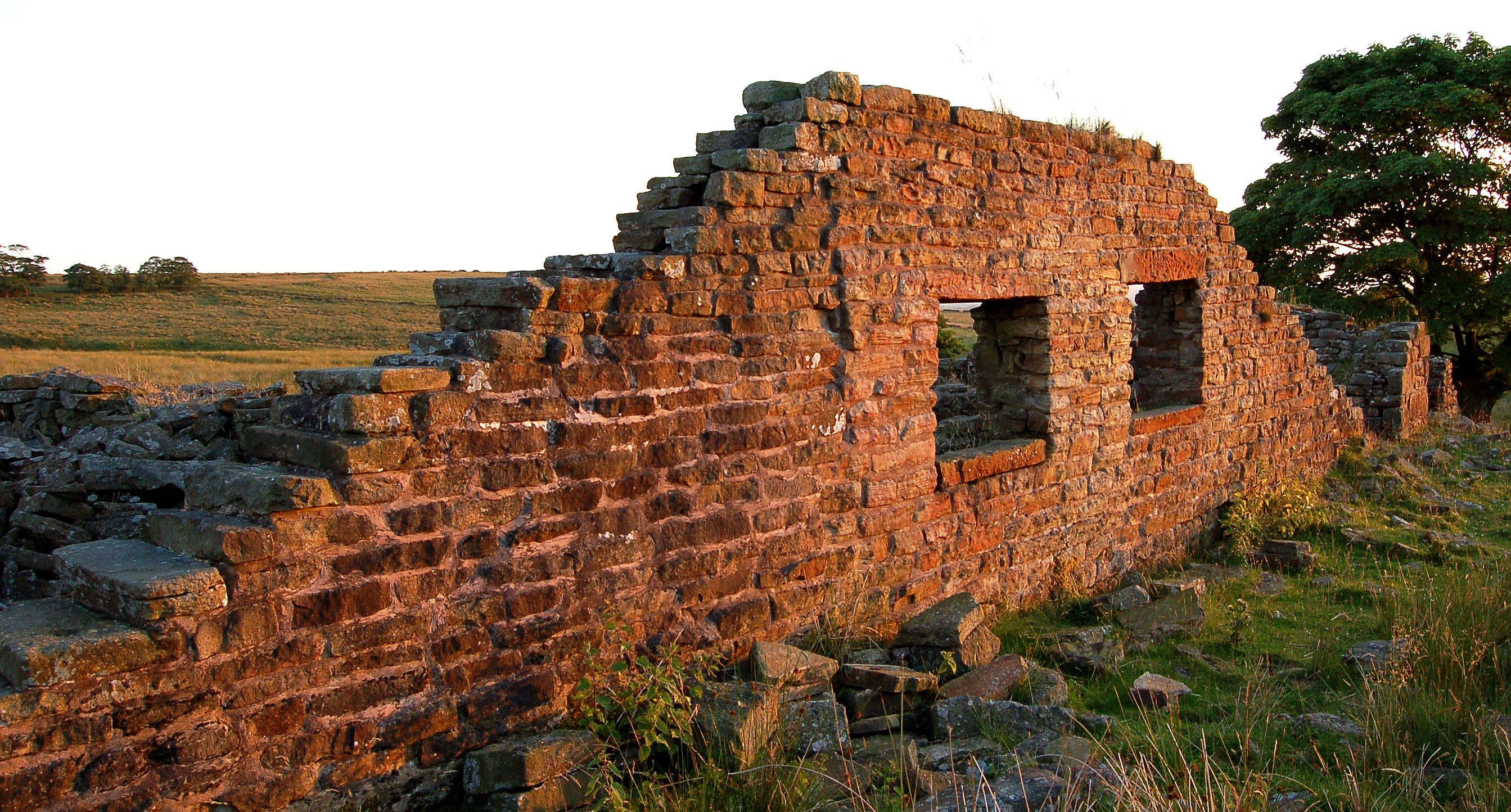
The ruins of Higher Hempshaw's, looking south-west

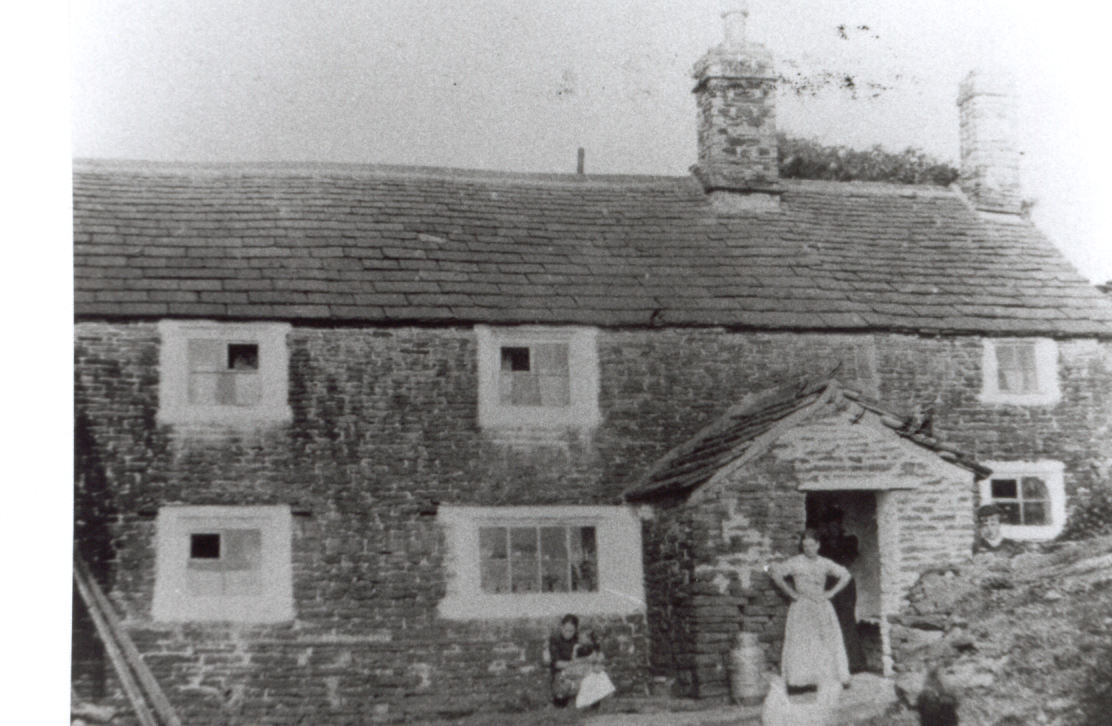
The last occupants of Old Rachel's

In the early 20th century, Foggs Farm, close to Peewet Hall, was vacated. The land was farmed by the Cocker family in the 18th century and by the Pilkingtons in the early 19th century. After properties were taken over by Liverpool Corporation they rented them out but due to neglect of the buildings, high rents, lack of amenities and shift to more accessible employment in towns the old farms were difficult to let and became abandoned, the corporation left them to become derelict, the population declined.

The historic buildings and some prominent large stone-built homes were either demolished or were used as target practice in military training while the area was under military use in World War II until 1950. Often, remnants of shells and sometimes live ammo have been found in the ruins. The remote farms are now landmarks for walkers and geocachers.

The remains of Lower and Higher Hempshaw's, farms inhabited by the Kershaws in the 19th century, are located by a tributary of the River Yarrow which is 300 metres to the southwest. Jepson's Farm and Jepson's Gate are waypoints en route to Pikestones. The last occupants of Old Rachel's were the Evans family in the 1880s. Simms, was once a farm of 52 acres farmed by Samuel Pilkington according to voter records in the 19th century, located on a private track and footpath. The property got its water from Green Withins Brook, a tributary of the River Yarrow and after being taken over by Liverpool Corporation was occupied by the Chairman of Horwich Urban District Council in 1928–29.

Waterman's Cottage is at the north end of Anglezarke Reservoir. Shorrocks was occupied by Abel Pilkington until his death in 1888; its ruins are by the bridge at White Coppice ponds at the north end of the reservoir.

==== Dwellings ====
- Abbott's (ruin)
- Anderton's (ruin)
- Brook House (ruin)
- Brown Hill (ruin)
- Butter Cross (ruin)
- Coomb (ruin)
- Fogg's (ruin)
- Gamekeeper's Cottage
- Higher Hempshaw's (ruin)
- Higher House (ruin)
- Hordern Stoops (ruin)
- Latham's / Wilcock's
- Lee House
- Lower Hempshaw's (ruin)
- Manor House
- Margery's Place (ruin)
- Morris House (ruin)
- Moses Cocker's
- Old Brook's (ruin)
- Old Knowle Farm (ruin)
- Old Rachel's (ruin)
- Parson's Bullough (ruin)
- Peewet Hall (ruin)
- Simms (ruin)
- Stones House (ruin)
- Stoops (ruin)
- Turners (ruin)
- Wilkinson Bullough

=== Past Industry ===
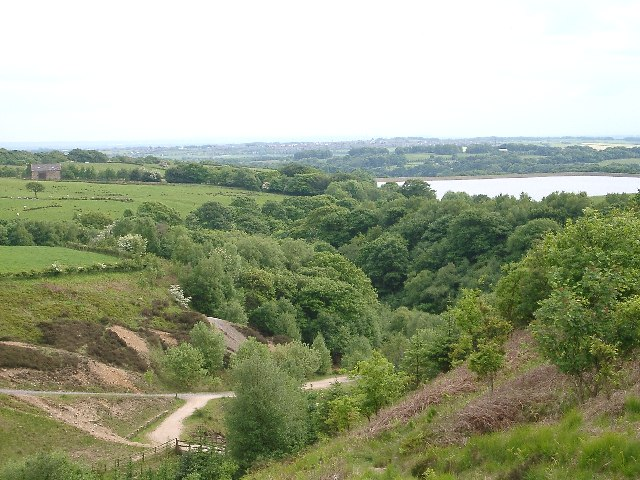
Lead Mines Clough

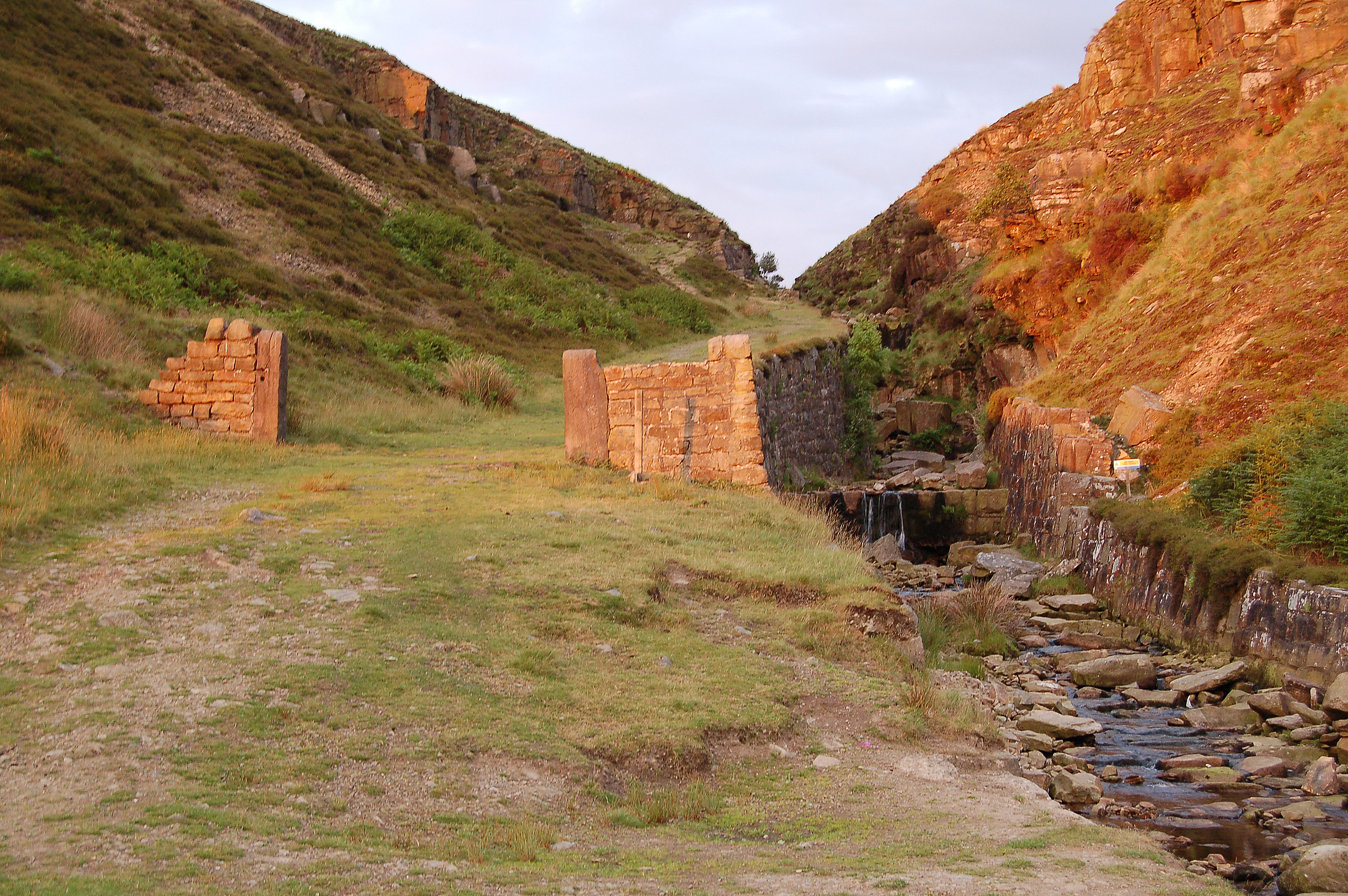
Dean Brook

There is considerable archaeological evidence of Roman presence in the neighbouring areas, it is believed lead was first mined during that time. Mining for lead was recommenced in 1692 by Sir Richard Standish in partnership with two farmers and a mining engineer and after several failures some lead was extracted. In 1694 Richard Standish declared in the Chancery Court that he could not sign over the mines to his wife as he was a tenant. After his death, his widow claimed the profits but lost the resultant court case and flooded the mines by diverting a stream. The mining operation restarted again and was expanded and in 1788–1789, 73 tons of lead were produced. In the 1790s copper and galena were produced. Production ended in 1837 when a lease, granted by Frank Hall Standish in 1824 to John Thompson of Wigan, Ironmaster was relinquished and the unsuccessful enterprise was abandoned. Lead Mines Clough had numerous shafts up to 240 feet deep and on the site was a smelting mill, a smithy and a waterwheel provided power. There are remains of bell pits at Dean Brook and spoil heaps containing traces of barites, calcite and galena. The mines were sealed in 1930 but there has been speculation that the site was part of a secret operation in 1940.

The mineral witherite (barium carbonate) was discovered in spoil from the mines in the 18th century. It was distinct from other sources as it contained above two per cent of carbonate of strontites. Up to this time witherite was considered worthless and used as rat poison by locals. Josiah Wedgwood used it to manufacture Jasper ware and tried to keep the source secret, but after a visit in 1782 by two Frenchmen, a local farmer, James Smithells, exported the mineral to Germany, charging five guineas per ton.

Leicester Mill Quarry, a major contributor to the economy in the 19th century producing gritstone flags, stone setts and kerbs for paving the streets of the industrialised towns. Between 1880 and 1920, quarry men, sett-makers and two blacksmiths were employed. Dressed stone was carted to Adlington station for transport. The quarry is no longer operational. Millstones were produced at Black Coppice, where some remain.

Coal was mined for local or personal use from drift mines where the coal seam outcropped from Fletcher Bank to Great Hill. The Margery Mine near White Coppice and the Sandbrook Mine in the Yarrow Valley were mined by six men in the 19th century. Drifts were opened up by locals during the 1926 General Strike.

A cotton mill was built by the stream at White Coppice. At first it was powered by a waterwheel but later the mill lodge was built to provide water for the steam engine. Around 1900 the mill was owned by Alfred Ephraim Eccles a supporter of the Temperance movement. Another small mill was built on the bank of the River Yarrow at the end of Bradley Wood of which no trace remains. Roger Lester lived in Anglezarke in 1769.

=== Reservoirs ===
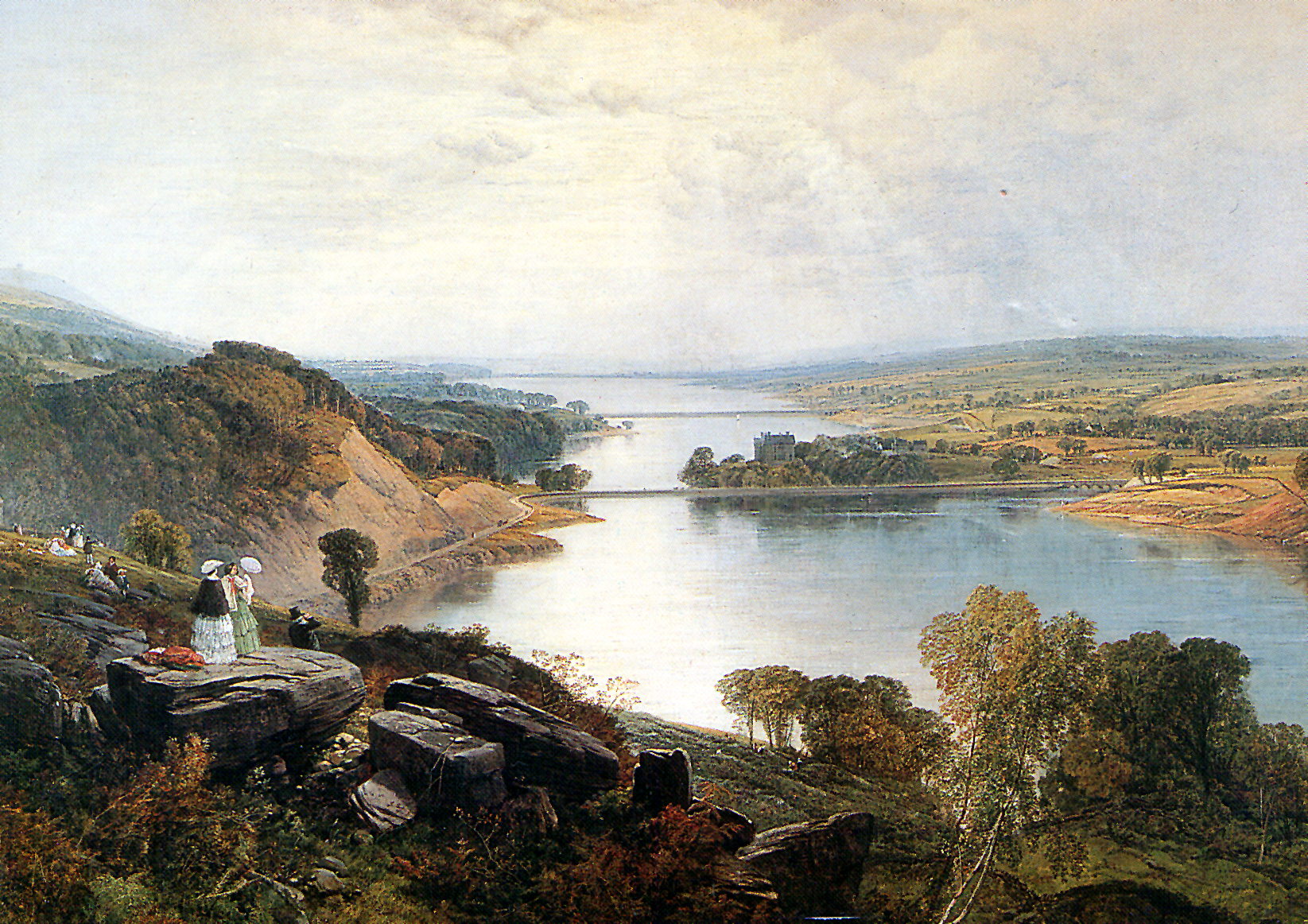
Rivington Chain with Anglezarke Reservoir in foreground, by Frederick William Hulme 1872

In 1850, Thomas Pilkington of the Manor House sold land to the Chorley Water Company to build High Bullough Reservoir, the first reservoir in the area. Demand for stone increased with the building of the Anglezarke Reservoir, the largest in the Rivington Reservoir Chain, in the 1850s. This led to increased production at local quarries.

Construction of the Yarrow Reservoir designed by Liverpool's Borough Engineer, Thomas Duncan, began in 1867. It is fed from the River Yarrow and Limestone Brook which have their sources on Anglezarke Moor. The three main reservoirs of the Rivington chain can be viewed at 'The Viewpoint', Moor Road, Anglezarke.

=== Second World War ===
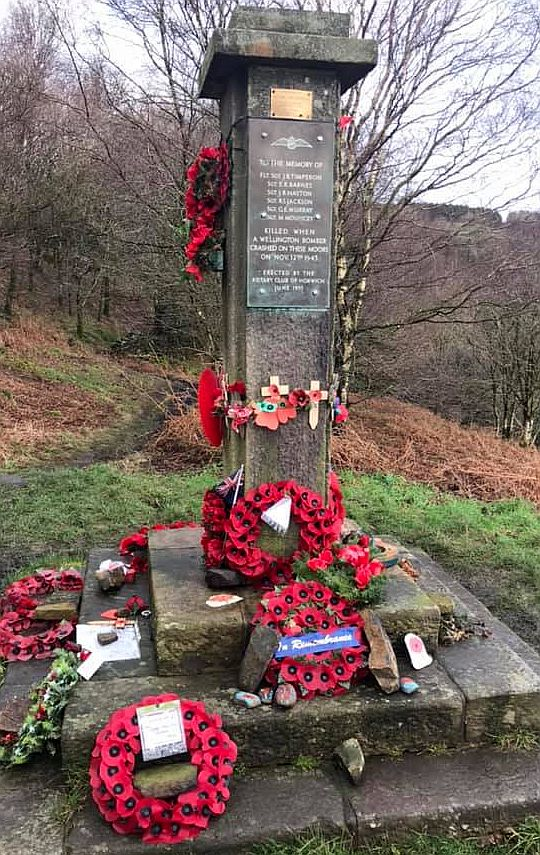
Memorial of the 1943 plane crash at Anglezarke

The area was used for food production and military training in World War II. On 16 November 1943, the crew of a Wellington Bomber (Z8799) from 28 Operational Training Unit, flying from Blackpool to Manchester, were killed when it crashed just to the North of Winter Hill, on Hurst Hill, Anglezarke Moor. According to an eye-witness, the plane was disintegrating as it crashed and its impact "shook the ground". The plane was piloted by Flight Sergeant Joseph B Timperon of the RAAF, with the other fatalities being the RAF Sergeants Eric R Barnes (airbomber), Joseph B Hayston (airgunner), Robert S Jackson (navigator), George E Murray (navigator) and Matthew Mouncey (airgunner). There is a memorial at the crash site, erected in June 1955 by the Horwich Rotary Club. Each year on Remembrance Sunday, a service is held at the Wellington Bomber Memorial at Lead Mines Clough, next to Limestone Brook. The old lead mines are believed to have played a role in the anti-invasion plans in the 1940s.

==== Post War ====
Most unexploded ordnance was cleared in 1946. Large amounts of munitions have been recovered from the Anglezarke moors which were extensively used by the military through the Second World War, with military use extending into the early Cold War period when reservists were given use of 1000 acres for military training by the government despite opposition from locals.

== Governance ==
Until the early 19th century, Anglezarke was a township in the ancient parish of Bolton le Moors, itself part of the hundred of Salford in Lancashire. In 1837, Anglezarke joined with other townships (or civil parishes) in the area to form the Chorley Poor Law Union which took responsibility for the administration and funding of the Poor Law in that area. In 1866, Anglezarke became a civil parish. It became part of the Chorley Rural Sanitary District from 1875 to 1894, and then part of the Chorley Rural District from 1894 to 1974. Since 1974, Anglezarke has been a civil parish of the Borough of Chorley.

Anglezarke is part of the Chorley parliamentary constituency, which elected Lindsay Hoyle as member of parliament for the Labour party at the 2010 General Election.

== Geography ==
Anglezarke covers 2,793 acres of high moorland on the western slopes of the West Pennine Moors reaching about 1,000 feet above sea level. Anglezarke is a settlement of scattered farmhouses with no village centre. The hamlet of White Coppice, where there was a cotton mill, is in the north-west corner, and Hempshaws, now in ruins, in the south-east. The township is crossed by a minor road on the western border from Rivington to Heapey. The underlying rocks are millstone grit and sandstones of the lower Lower Coal Measures. There were several quarries whose stone was used for road-making. The source of the River Yarrow is at Will Narr on Anglezarke Moor. The west of the area is dominated by the Anglezarke and Yarrow Reservoirs.

== Population ==
Population changes of the township/civil parish of Anglezarke

Year	Population	±%
1801	162	—
1811	181	+11.7%
1821	215	+18.8%
1831	168	−21.9%
1841	164	−2.4%
1851	179	+9.1%

Year	Population	±%
1861	134	−25.1%
1871	195	+45.5%
1881	99	−49.2%
1891	92	−7.1%
1901	93	+1.1%
1911	63	−32.3%

Year	Population	±%
1921	51	−19.0%
1931	40	−21.6%
1951	37	−7.5%
1961	30	−18.9%
1971	29	−3.3%
2001	23	−20.7%

Sources: (a) Pauline Tatton. (b) A vision of Britain through time. (c) Adlington in Context.

== Economy ==
Anglezarke's economy is primarily agricultural, with land used mostly for grazing. Some farmers have diversified into providing leisure and storage facilities for camping, caravanning and guest accommodation. Tourists are attracted by the historic landscape and scenery and access to a network of hiking trails.

== Sports ==
Anglezarke Quarry is a destination for rock climbing and has been used for training by serious climbers such as Sir Chris Bonington. Cricket is played at White Coppice. The area was the location for the 2002 Commonwealth Games Mountain Biking competition. There is an extensive network of footpaths providing public access for hikers.

== Popular culture ==
Anglezarke Quarry was used for filming the TV series Jewel in the Crown in 1984. Anglezarke is a setting in the book, The Spook's Secret by Joseph Delaney. Musician and poet Richard Skelton used the Anglezarke landscape to inspire his writing and music.

In the "Now.Here," Book saga, Shenandoah, the coastal forest hometown to the main character, Kiona, is built on top of what was Anglezarke that perished during "The Firestorm" event that occurred over 300 years prior, during the Hundred Years War.

== See also ==
- Listed buildings in Anglezarke
