= Great Hill (England) =

Mountain in Lancashire, England

Coordinates: 53.66717°N 2.53725°W

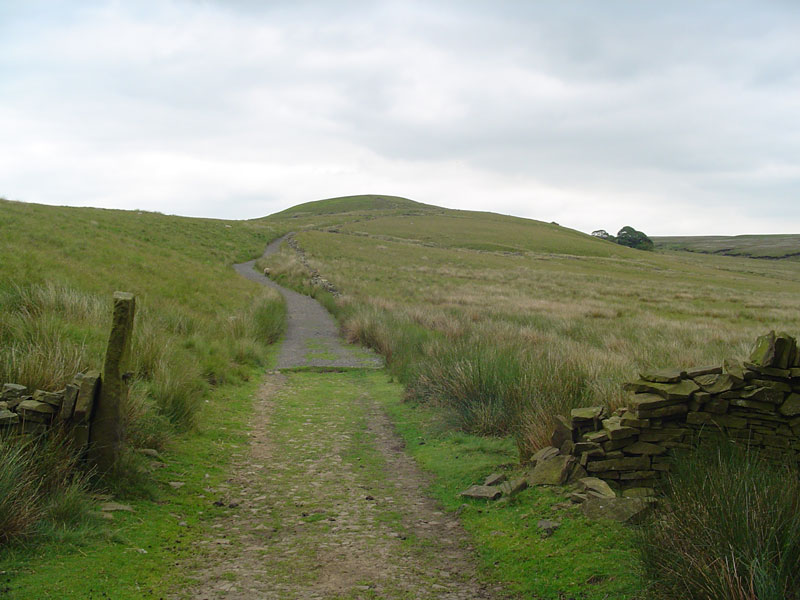
- Approaching Great Hill from Drinkwaters to the west

Highest point
- Elevation: 381 m (1,250 ft)

Geography
- Location within Lancashire Location within the Borough of Chorley
- Location: Chorley, Lancashire, England
- OS grid: SD646191
- Topo map: OS Landranger 109

Great Hill is a hill in Lancashire, England, on Anglezarke Moor, between the towns of Chorley and Darwen. It is part of the West Pennine Moors and lies approximately 3 miles north of Winter Hill, the highest point in the area at 456 m (1,498 ft).

The summit at 381 m (1,252 ft) is only slightly higher than the surrounding moorland, but provides excellent views in all directions particularly to the north and west. Paths head west towards White Coppice via the ruins of Drinkwaters, south to Winter Hill via Hordern Stoops, and east to Darwen Tower via Pimm's, Picadilly and the ruins of Hollinshead Hall.

The sources of Black Brook and the River Roddlesworth are on the slopes of the hill.

The traditional walker's cairn has been replaced by a stone bench in the shape of a cross, which offers shelter from the wind.
