= Yarrow Reservoir =

Reservoir in Lancashire, England

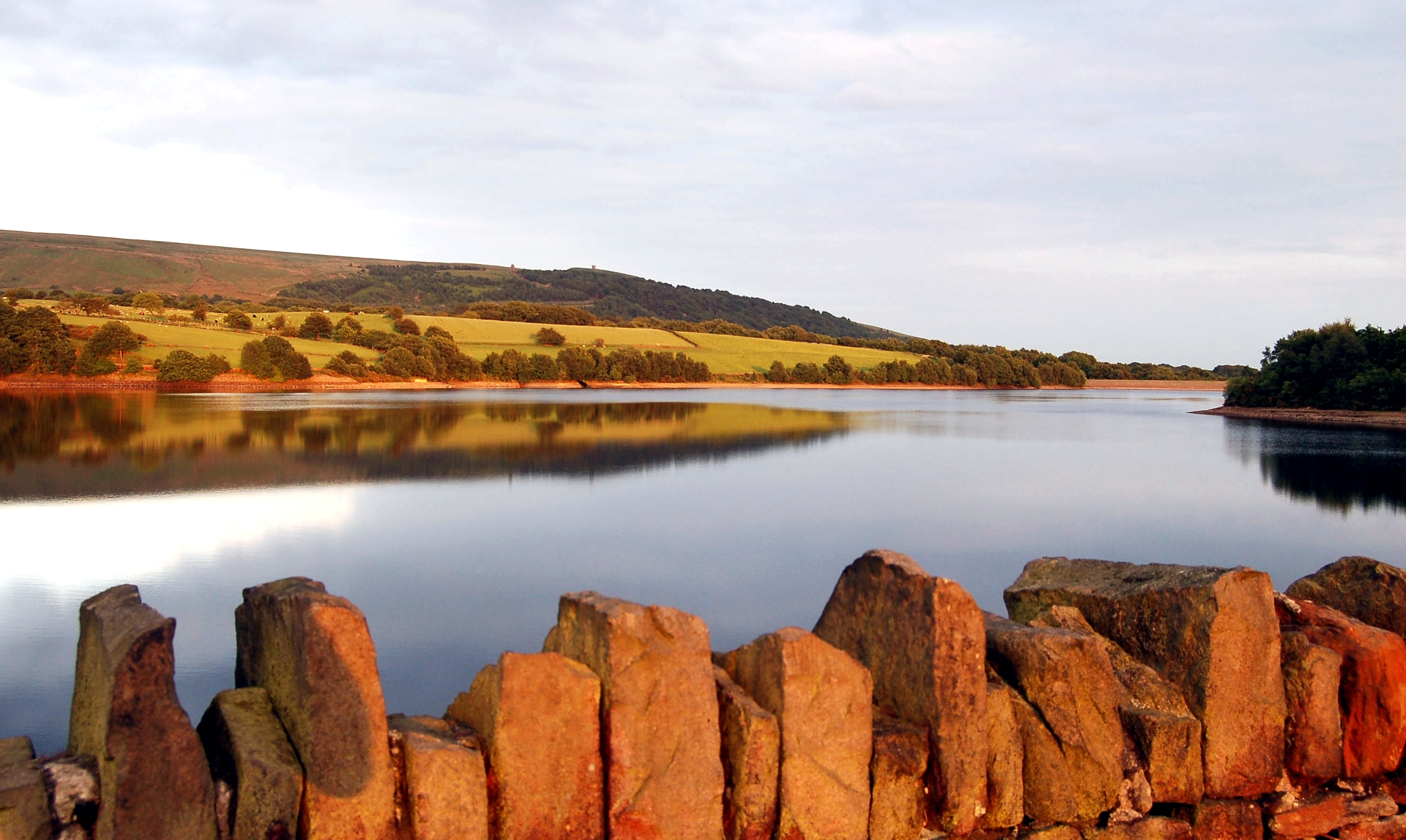
- Overlooking Rivington Pike

- Shown within Chorley Borough
- Location: Lancashire
- Coordinates: 53°38′10″N 2°34′3″W
- Type: Reservoir
- Primary inflows: River Yarrow
- Primary outflows: River Yarrow
- Basin countries: United Kingdom
- Settlements: Chorley, Lancashire

Yarrow Reservoir – named after the River Yarrow – is a reservoir in the Rivington chain in Anglezarke, Lancashire, England, and has a storage capacity second to Anglezarke Reservoir. Construction of the reservoir, designed by Liverpool Borough Engineer Thomas Duncan, began in 1867.

In 2002, several tons of fish were transported to this reservoir when the Upper Rivington reservoir was completely drained for essential maintenance work.

The construction of Yarrow Reservoir was described in Wm. Fergusson Irvine's book A Short History of the Township of Rivington:

A suitable site for the embankment having been selected, a trench was excavated on the centre line of the intended work and carried down to the solid rock right across the valley. This was filled with clay deposited in layers of 9 inches, and carefully puddled so as to produce a homogeneous watertight material. This clay wall, having reached the natural surface of the ground, was continued through the embankment, which was also built in thin layers thoroughly rammed and consolidated on both sides of the clay centre. Before commencing the erection of the embankment all peat and unsound material were stripped from the site. The inner or water slopes of the embankment have been built to an angle of 3 to 1, and outer slopes to an angle of 2 to 1. The impermeability of the dam depends upon the wall of puddled clay in the heart of the dam tied into the solid rock at the bottom and sides of the valley. The clay wall has been carried up to a batter on each side of 1 inch to every foot vertical, the thickness at the top being 6 feet. The inner slopes of the bank are protected by 15-inch pitching, consisting of the millstone grit of the neighbourhood, laid on a bed of broken stone. The outer slopes have been soiled and grassed over.

The construction of the reservoir meant that a small hamlet called Alance was flooded, centred on the rebuilt Alance Bridge, and a large dwelling was demolished - Turner's Farm - which lives on in current maps only in name as Turner's Embankment.
