= Lancashire Archives =

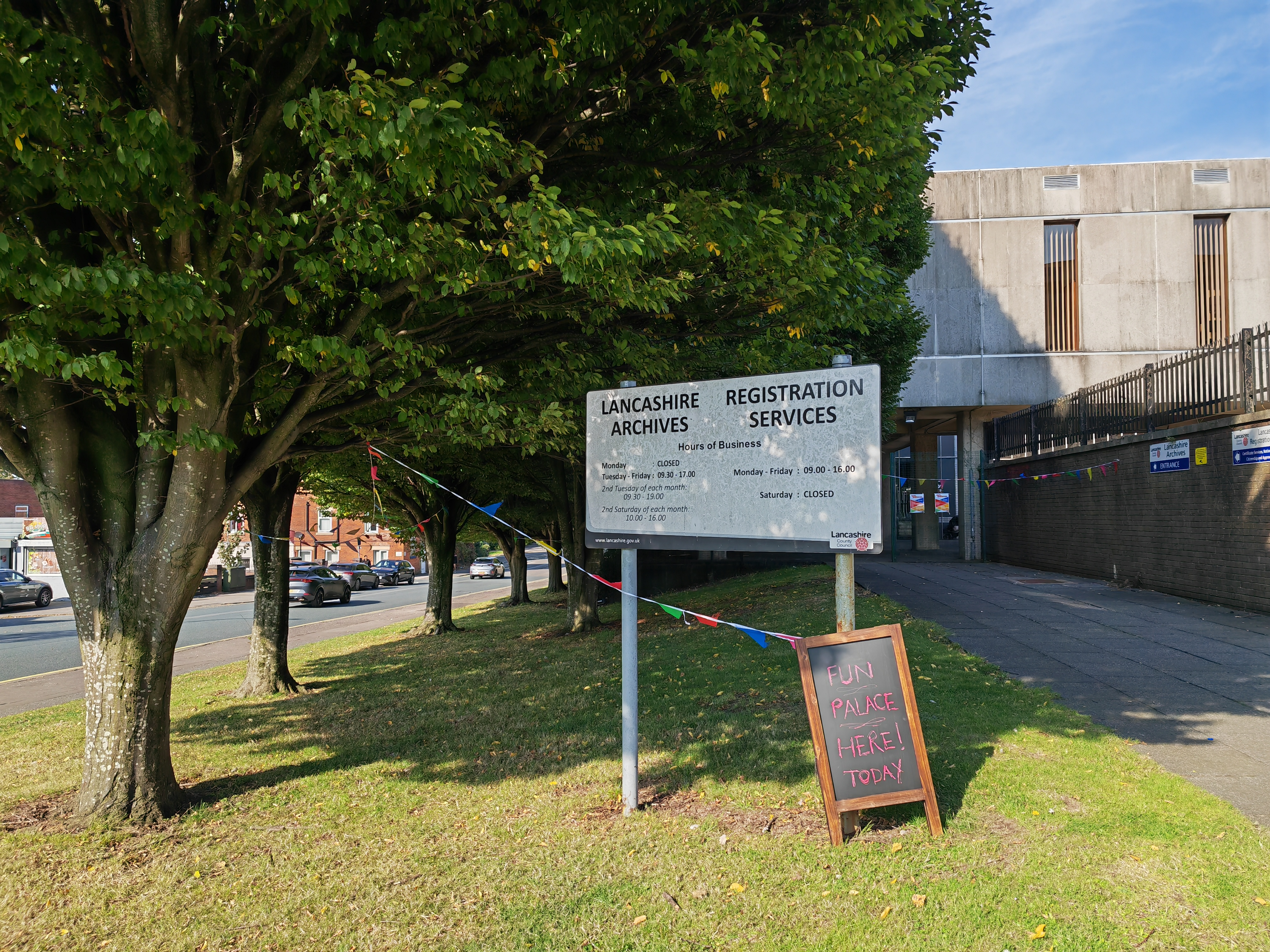
- Interactive map of Lancashire Archives
- 53.758375478968404°N 2.711186811240743°W
- Location: Bow Lane, Preston, Lancashire, PR1 2RE, Preston, England
- Established: 1940
- Website: Libraries and Archives

The Lancashire Archives, previously known as the Lancashire Record Office, is a county record office located in the city of Preston which serves Lancashire, England. It was established in 1940.

== Early history ==
In 1808 the Lancashire Justices first took an interest in the records, ordering the Clerk of the Peace to "arrange the Public Records in his office in such a manner as to him shall appear to be the most proper, for their preservation and utility". In 1879, the Justices obtained an Act of Parliament allowing them to build offices for "county business". This included a room for keeping the county records. Sessions House was built in 1903 with rooms for documents in it.

In December 1937, the Preston and mid-Lancashire branch of the Historical Association sent a petition to Lancashire County Council, asking whether the council could "sanction and establish a depository for documents of local interest". A committee was set up to investigate the situation.

== Commencement ==
In May 1940, the Lancashire Record Office was established as the county record office for Lancashire. In November 1940, the Master of the Rolls recognised the Lancashire Record Office as a manorial repository. The first deposit to the Archives came from the Fylde Historical and Antiquarian Society.

Lancashire County Council appointed Reginald Sharpe France as the first County Archivist; from 1947 he also taught on the Diploma in Archive Administration at the University of Liverpool, establishing a link between the record office and the university.

Sharpe France worked alone until 1941, when an unqualified assistant was appointed. Due to World War II, there were almost no enquiries for documents or searchers – only 66 visitors are recorded in 1940, and 90 in 1941. Sharpe France and his assistant could acquire documents and catalogue them without interruption.

Guide to the Lancashire Record Office was first published in 1948. In 1950, the archives held an exhibition for their 10th anniversary, opened by Earl Peel, on March 15–18 March at the county office in Preston. Around 2000 visitors attended it.

Sharpe France remained County Archivist until 1976.

== Sessions House ==
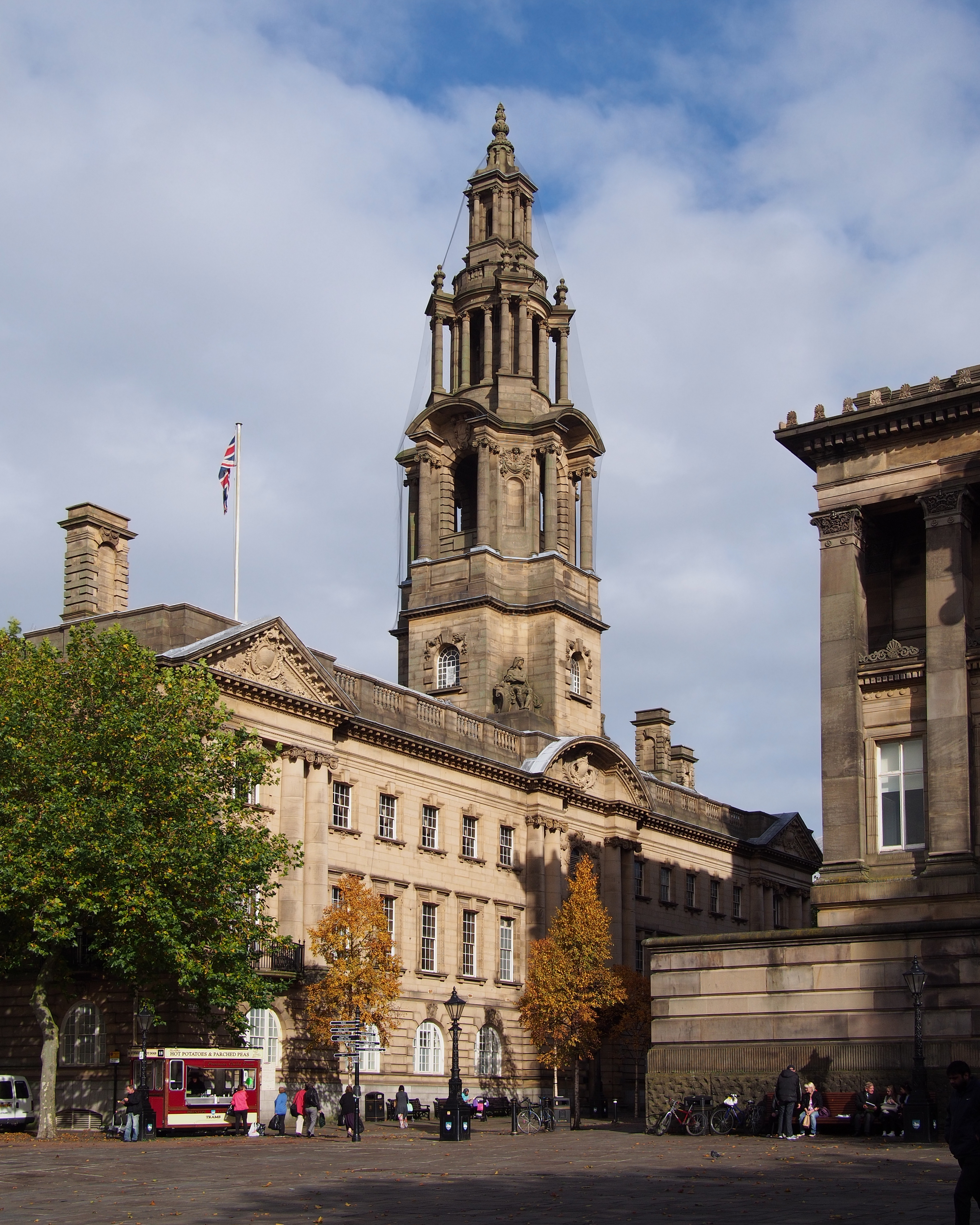
Sessions House, Preston

As visitors increased and as more documents were taken in, a strain began to develop on the archives. In 1960, the archives moved to larger premises in the Sessions House. In 1963, the first archaeologist, Ben Edwards, was appointed.

However, in October 1966 minutes of the County Records Sub-Committee noted the need for more accommodation – the strongrooms were likely to fill up in a year. The archives could not accommodate all the visitors comfortably. There was no private accommodation for staff and refreshments had to be taken in the repairer's room. The repair room was too small, meaning big maps could not be repaired. Bookshelves were overflowing. All this led to the need to build a new record office.

== Bow Lane ==
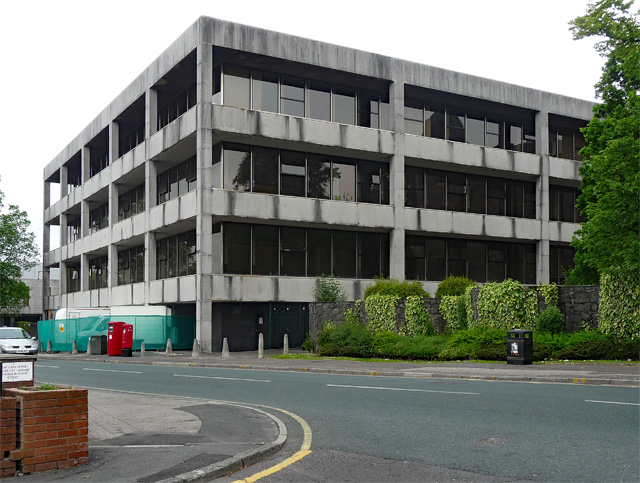
Register Office building in Bow Lane, Preston

In 1975, the archives moved to a new purpose-built building for the archives in Bow Lane in Preston. The official opening, by Lord Clitheroe, was held on 31 October. Two special exhibitions were held at the archives to commemorate this event.

In 1976 John Keith Bishop was appointed as the new County Archivist. The archives also launched a job-creation scheme, employing seven people in 1976. In 1979, Ken Hall was appointed as County Archivist.

In 1986, the Friends of Lancashire Archives was formed. An independent organisation and registered charity, the FLA was set up to promote and support the archives. The FLA put on activities for members, including talks and training opportunities, as well as walks and social events. Over the years the FLA has raised over £75,000 for the archives. According to their website, they are currently funding a cataloguing programme for the archives. The first president of the FLA was Lord Lieutenant Mr Simon Towneley.

Later on, in 1989, the Lancashire County Council gave the archives a go-ahead to introduce computers into their work. This was made possible by the Hope Floyd Bequest fund, a fund set up in 1973 after the death of Thomas Hope Floyd. A location index was available on computers, and the issuing and returning of documents in the search room was much quicker. At a cost of £21,530, this helped the archives deliver a quicker, better service.

In 1993, Bruce Jackson was appointed as County Archivist.
