= High Bullough Reservoir =

Reservoir in Lancashire, England

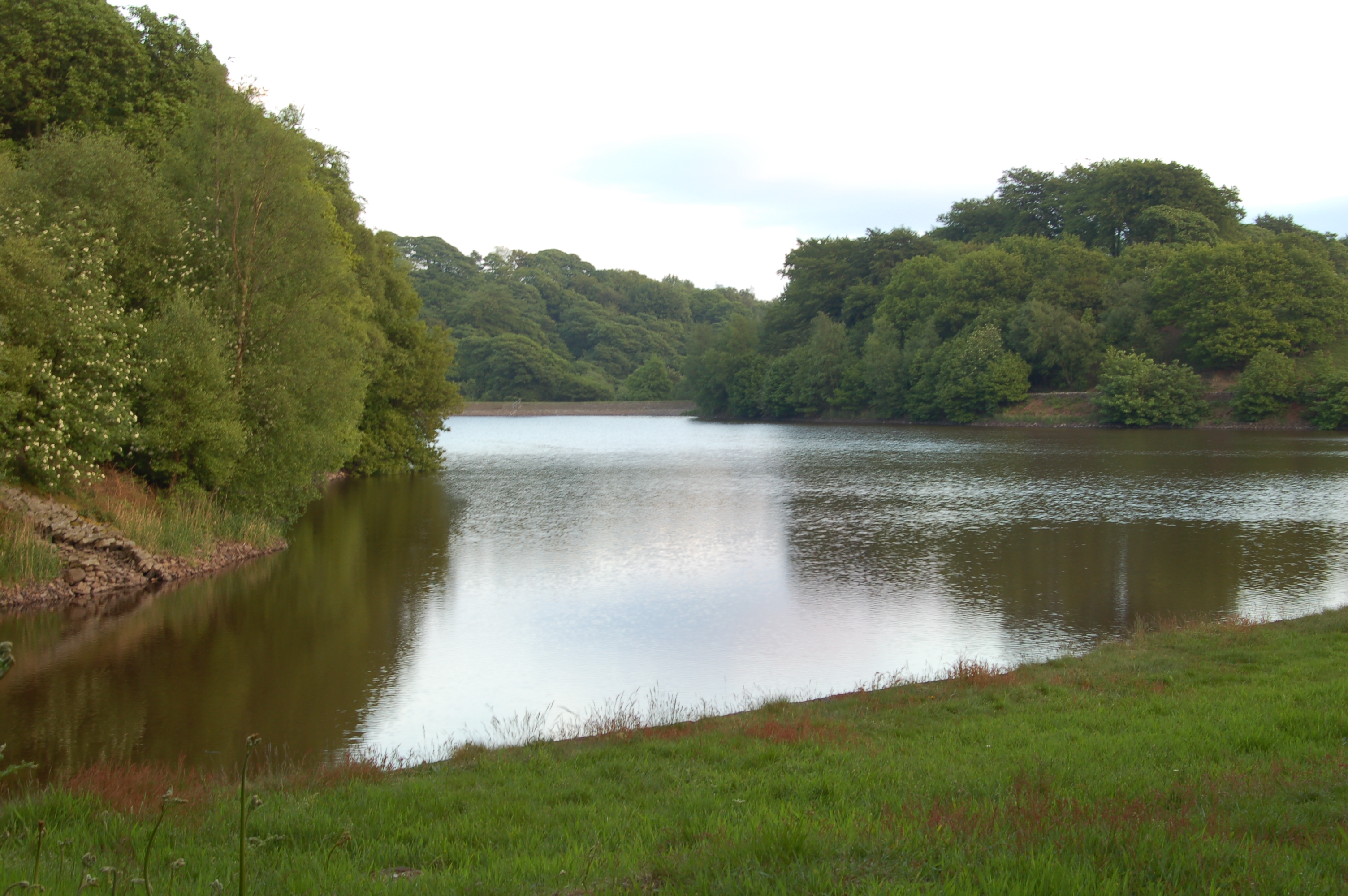

- Shown within Chorley Borough
- Location: Lancashire
- Coordinates: 53°38′50″N 2°34′41″W
- Type: reservoir
- Basin countries: United Kingdom

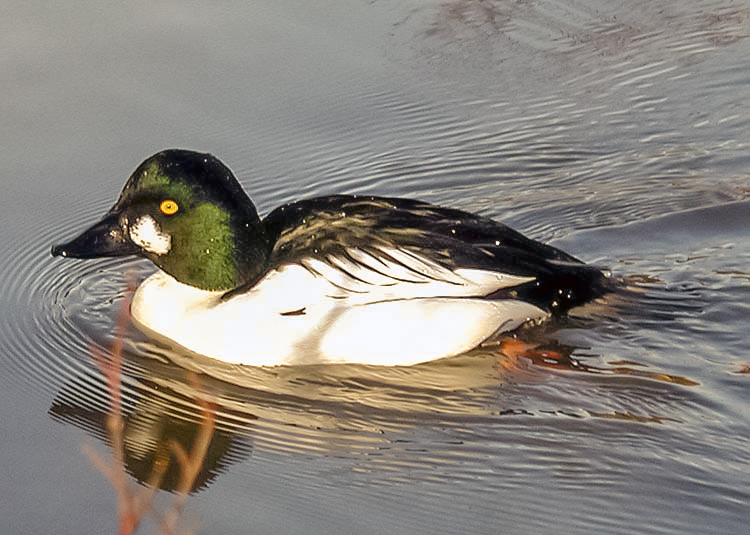
A Goldeneye, a common winter visitor to the sanctuary

High Bullough Reservoir is the oldest of all the reservoirs in the Rivington chain, having been authorised by the Chorley Waterworks Act 1846 (9 & 10 Vict. c. cclxxxvii) and completed in 1850. It was built for Chorley Waterworks by the engineer John Frederick Bateman, who had estimated the cost of the project while working for Edwin Chadwick's Towns Improvement Company, and had then acted as Engineer for the project. The outlet consisted of a pipe running through the dam, and supported by two masonry piers where it ran through the central clay puddle. The outlet valve was at the downstream end of the dam, and although this configuration is no longer thought to be good practice, there have been no serious issues with the reservoir throughout its operational life. The earth dam had a maximum height of 39 feet (12 m), was 988 feet (301 m) long and impounded 55 million imperial gallons (250 Ml) of water.

Popular with walkers, it forms part of the Anglezarke trail, although it is also accessible from Manor House. It was originally named Chorley Reservoir. There are a number of websites that state that High Bullough Reservoir is no longer used to supply drinking water, but the reservoir was still contained in a list of reservoirs in the Rivington Chain when United Utilities issued an application for a drought permit to reduce compensation flows to the River Yarrow in mid-2018.

A huge staircase, made from timber, was created between the reservoir and nearby Manor House. Known as Jacob's Ladder, the remains can be seen on the east side of the water.

== Bibliography ==
- Binnie, G M (1981). Early Victorian Water Engineers. Thomas Telford. ISBN 978-0-7277-0128-2.
