= White Coppice =

Hamlet in Lancashire, England

Coordinates: 53.666°N 2.582°W

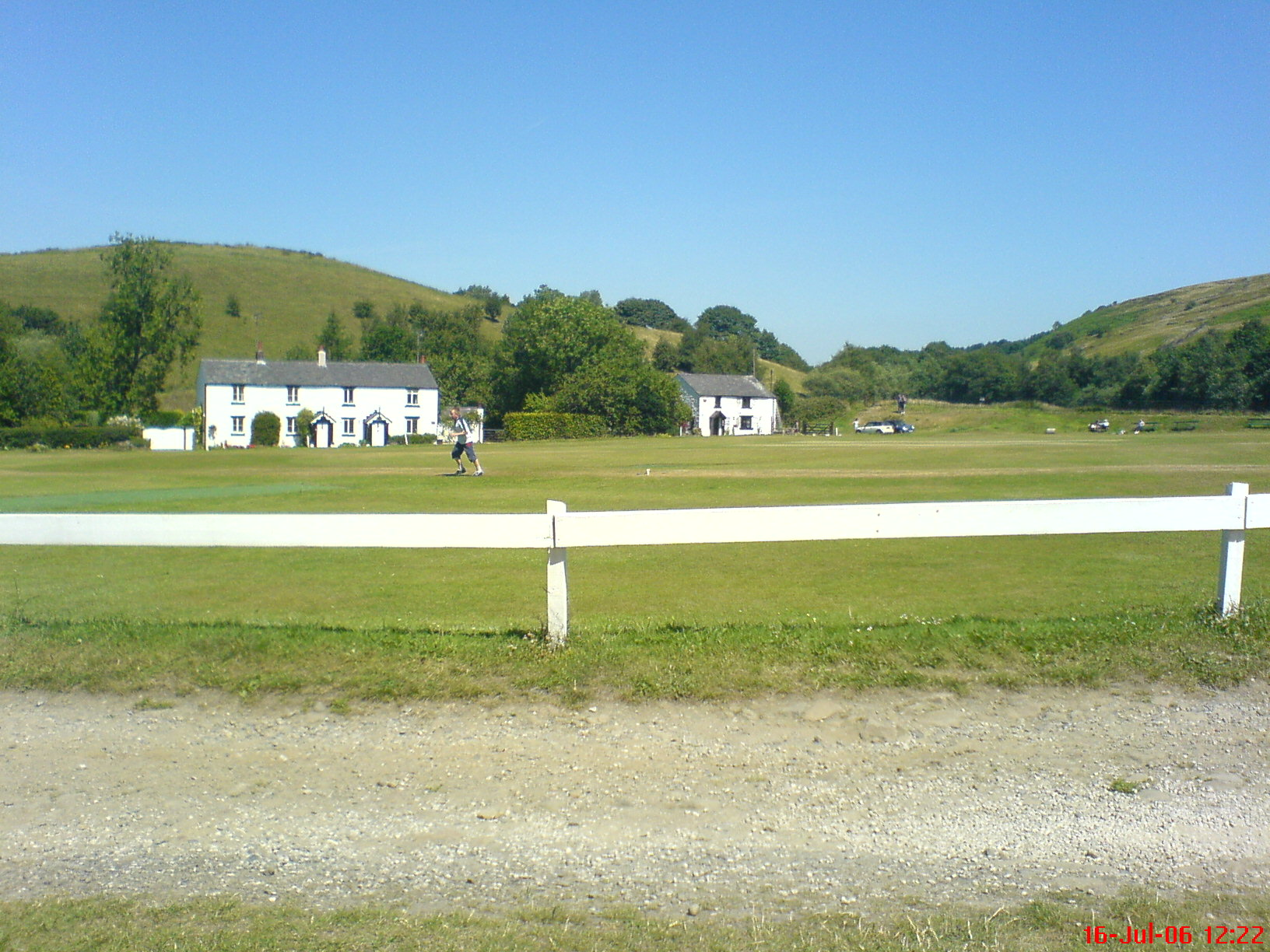
- White Coppice Cricket Ground

- Shown within Chorley Borough Location within Lancashire
- OS grid reference: SD616190
- Civil parish: Anglezarke
- District: Chorley
- Shire county: Lancashire
- Region: North West
- Country: England
- Sovereign state: United Kingdom
- Post town: CHORLEY
- Postcode district: PR6
- Dialling code: 01257
- Police: Lancashire
- Fire: Lancashire
- Ambulance: North West
- UK Parliament: Chorley

White Coppice is a hamlet near Chorley, Lancashire, England. It was the most populated part of the township of Anglezarke in the 19th century. Close to the settlement in the early 19th century were quarries and small coal mines. The hamlet lies to the north of Anglezarke Reservoir in the Rivington reservoir chain built to provide water for Liverpool in the mid 19th century. To the south west is a hill known as Healey Nab.

White Coppice had a cotton mill at the start of the Industrial Revolution. Its mill lodge provided water for a steam engine, and before that the mill was powered by a waterwheel on the Black Brook. Around 1900 the mill was owned by Alfred Ephraim Eccles, a supporter of the Temperance movement.

== Notable residents ==
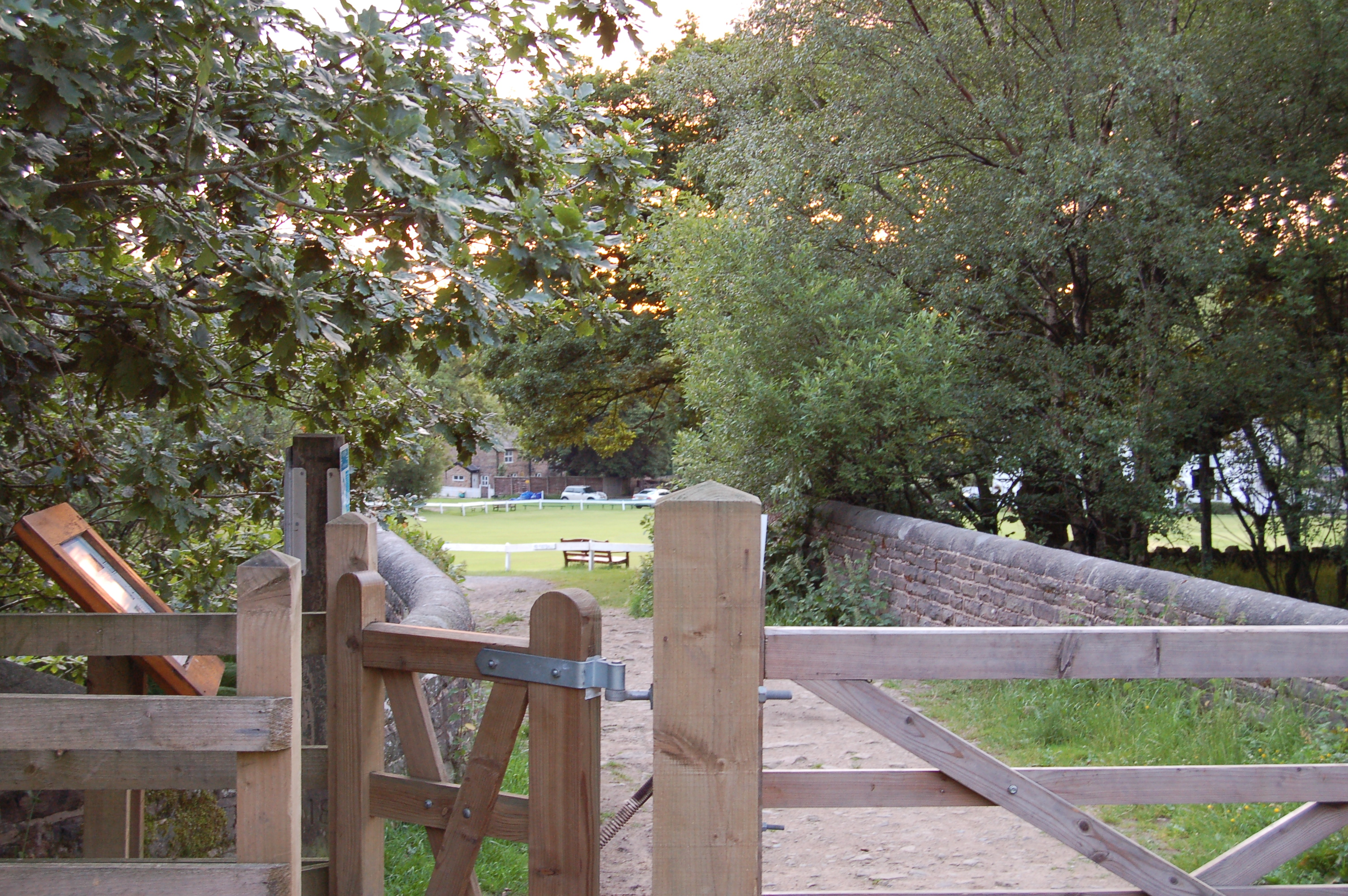
Looking towards the ubiquitous cricket pitch across The Goit

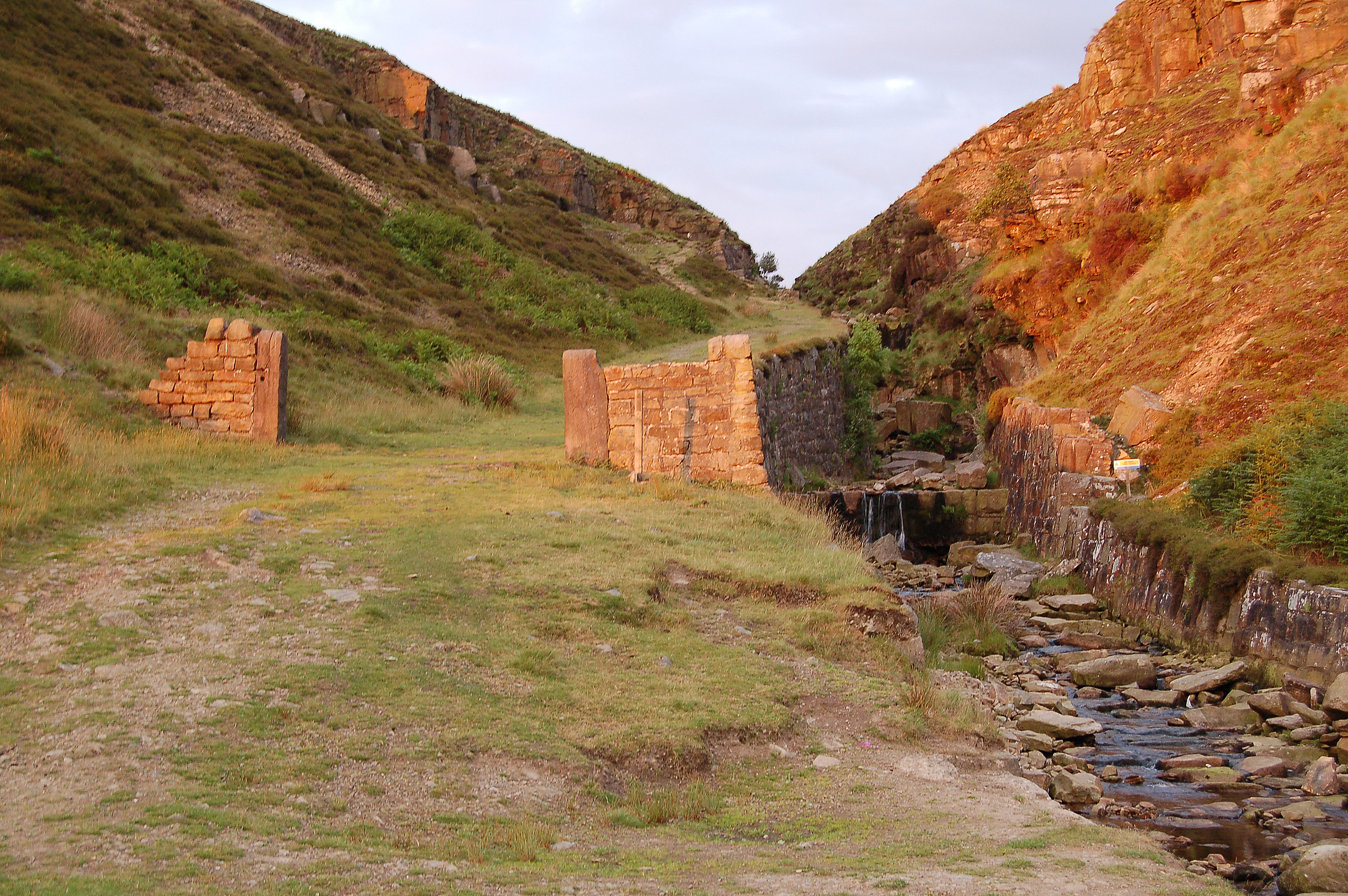
Looking towards Great Hill, this view of Dean Black Brook clearly shows evidence of the area's mining past

- Walter Haworth was born here on 19 March 1883 and won a Nobel Prize in chemistry.
- Sir Henry Tate, 1st Baronet was born on 11 March 1819 in White Coppice. He was an English sugar merchant and philanthropist, noted for establishing the Tate Gallery, London.

== Cricket ==
Cricket is played at a ground in the hamlet. The 1st and 2nd XI cricket teams now play in the Moore and Smalley Palace Shield. The last time the club won a trophy was in 2001, when the first team won the Ley Cup under the captaincy of Steve Harris, beating Walton Le Dale in the final at New Longton Cricket Club.

The BBC Children's television show Sloggers was filmed at the cricket ground in 1994.
