= Jubilee Tower =

Tower on Darwen Hill in Lancashire, England

Darwen Tower
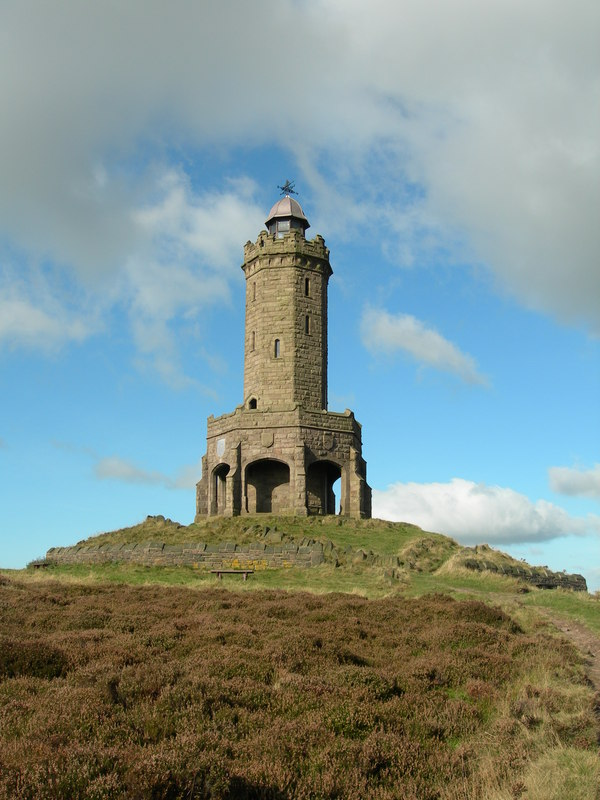

- Location within Blackburn with Darwen

General information
- Location: Darwen Hill, Darwen, Lancashire, England
- Coordinates: 53°41′22.7″N 2°29′16.8″W
- Opened: 24 September 1898

Height
- Height: 85 ft (26 m)

The octagonal Jubilee Tower (officially called Darwen Tower) on Darwen Hill overlooking the town of Darwen in Lancashire, England, was completed in 1898 to celebrate the Diamond Jubilee of Queen Victoria. It also commemorated the victory of the local people for the right of access to the surrounding moors. It was opened to the public on 24 September 1898.

The tower is 85 feet (25.9 m) in height; Darwen Hill (also known as Beacon Hill) is 1,220 feet (370 metres) above sea-level. Walkers can climb to the top of the tower via the internal staircase to see views of North Yorkshire, Morecambe Bay, Blackpool Tower, Cumbria, the Isle of Man, North Wales, Derbyshire, elsewhere in Lancashire, and surrounding moorland.

== Background ==
Packmen, pedlars, farmers and labourers used tracks and moorland paths to go about their business, but in the 19th century landowners began blocking ancient rights of way. In the 1870s the Lord of the manor of Over Darwen – and absentee landlord – the Reverend William Arthur Duckworth blocked paths so as to prevent public access to the moor. Game-shooting rights were lucrative and Duckworth did not wish to have his land devalued by its use by the public exercising its rights of way.

William Thomas Ashton, manager of Eccles Shorrock's mines at Dogshaw Clough and Entwistle Moss, used the moorland footpaths to deliver coal to farmers and other customers. Whenever Duckworth's gamekeepers blocked the paths Ashton cleared them. Others took up the up the cause, joined by hundreds of local people. Eventually, after eighteen years of bloody skirmishes, lawsuits and protracted negotiations, Duckworth and his lessee of the shooting rights, a Mr Ashworth, reached a compromise with the campaigners. Nearly 300 acres of moorland passed into public possession in September 1896.

A large procession, formed of the Town Council, friendly and trade societies, police and fire brigades, and the Blackburn and Darwen Volunteers, accompanied by six brass bands, marched with waving banners to the top of the hill. Speeches were delivered by Ashton's son (his father having died in 1894), the local MP, the mayor and others. About 15,000 people were assembled, and after the moors had been formally taken over by the council a bonfire was lit, followed by a display of fireworks.

Soon after the land was in public possession the suggestion of a building a tower there was adopted. Councillor Robert Shorrock, chairman of the parks committee, formally proposed at a town meeting that the tower be built and more than £1,500 was soon raised by public subscription.

== Architecture and history ==
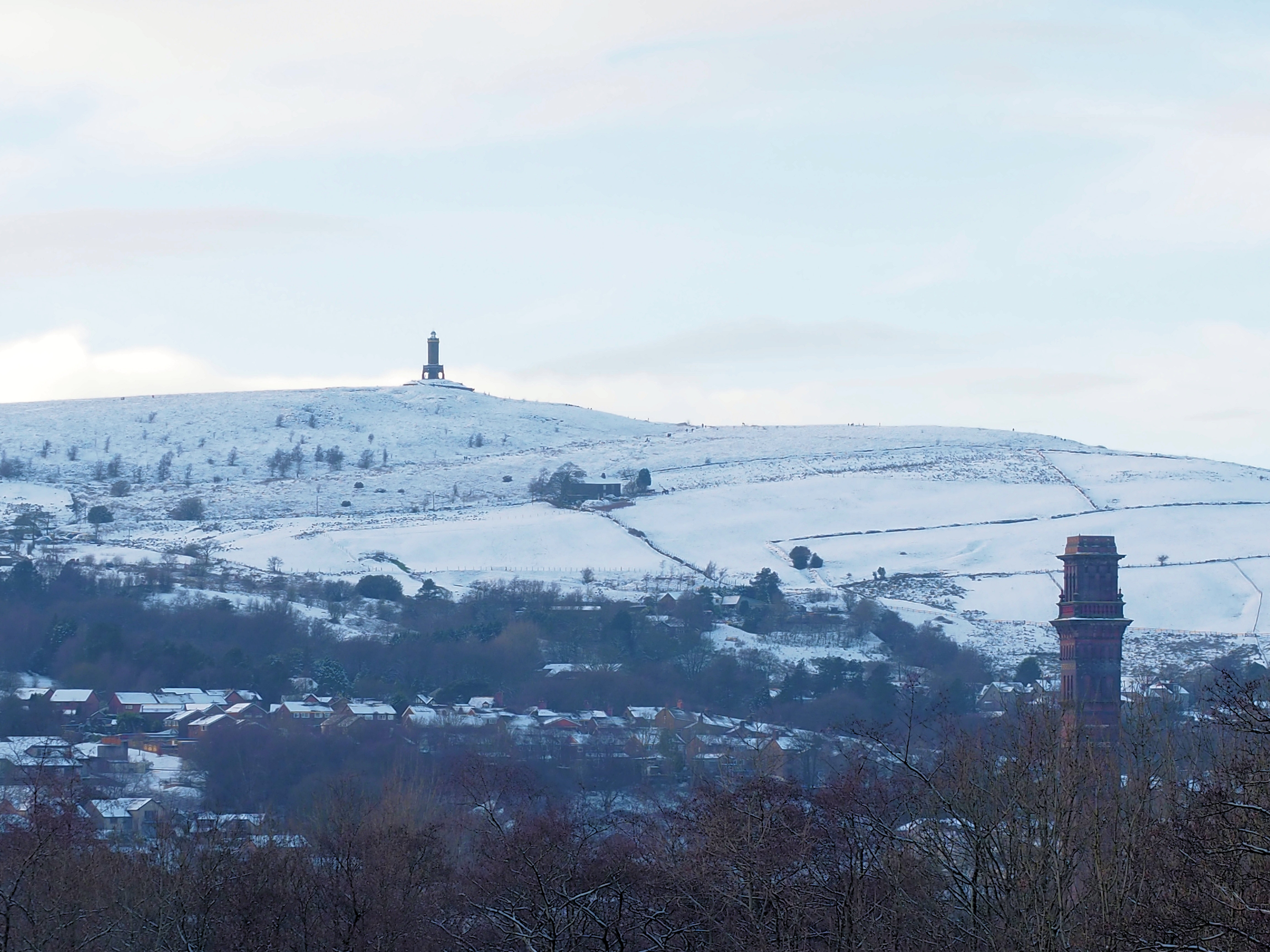
Winter view of the tower from Darwen

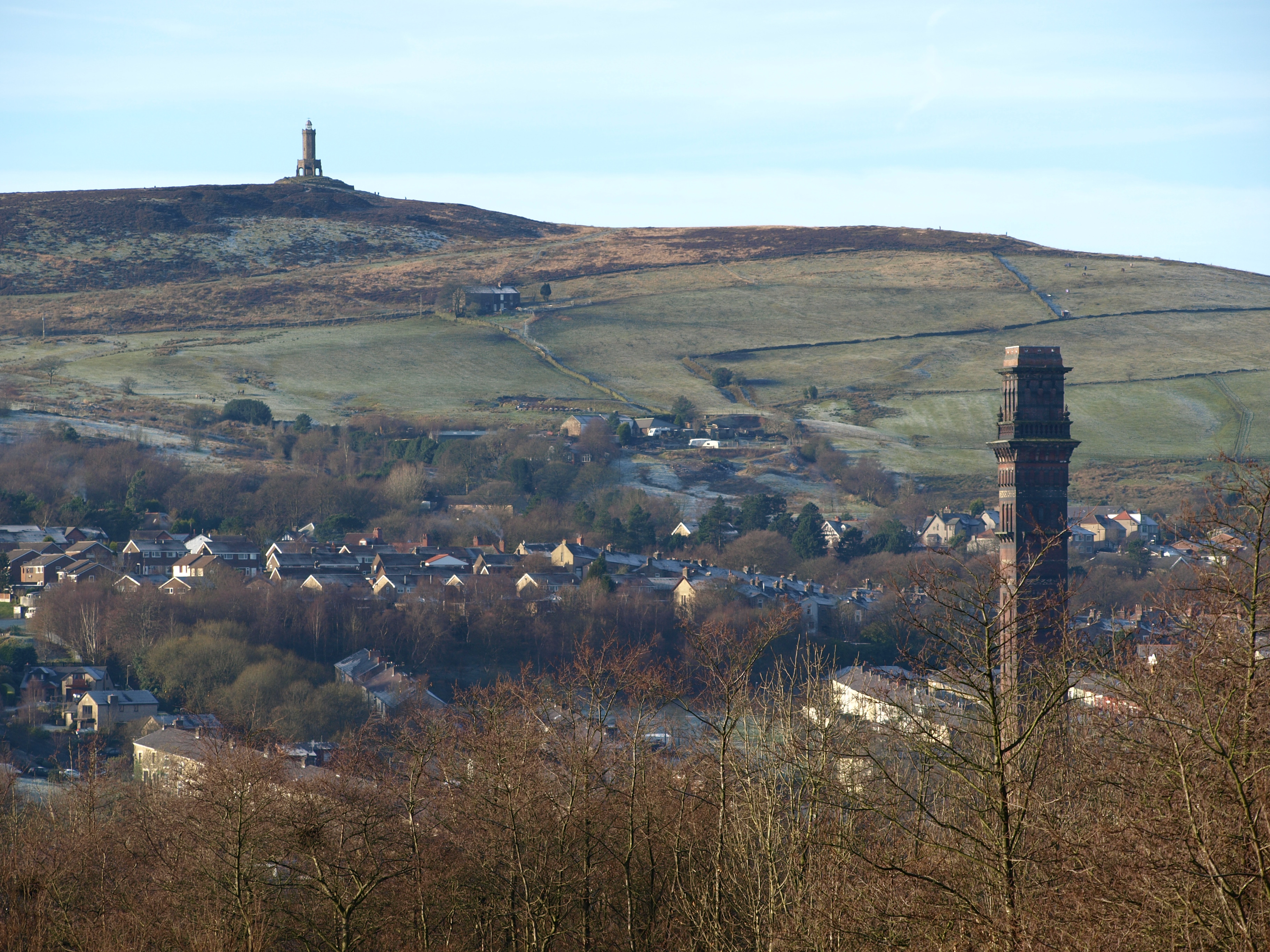
Summer view of the tower from Darwen

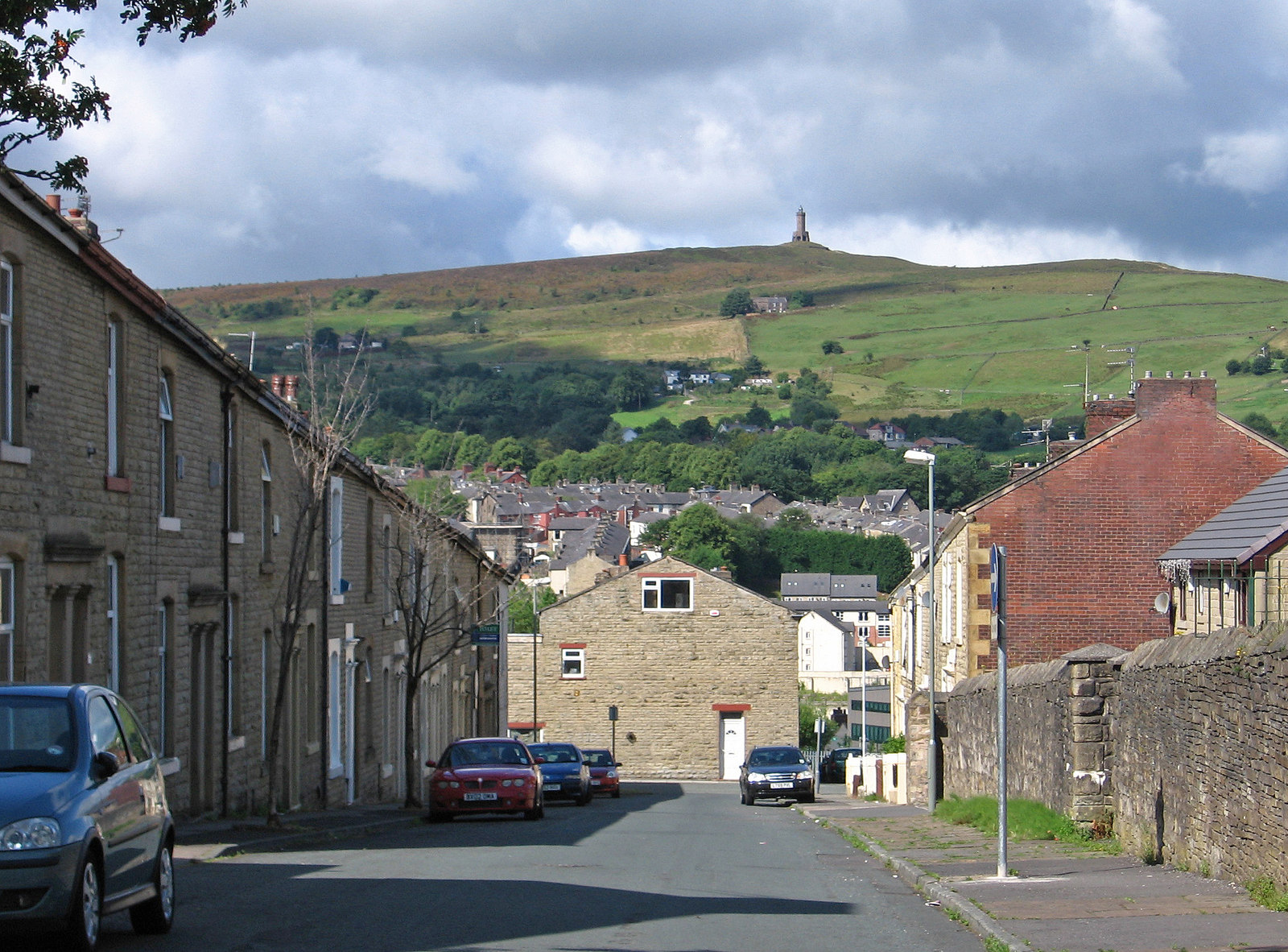
The tower seen from a Darwen street

The council insisted that the main contractors should all be local to Darwen. The subsequent competition for the design of the tower was won by David Ellison, an employee in the borough surveyor's office. His design was later modified by his senior, the borough surveyor, Robert William Smith-Saville. The builder was R. J. Whalley of Darwen. The stone for the tower was donated by Duckworth, who performed the opening ceremony on 24 September 1898 in front of large crowds and local dignitaries. The eastern and western pediments of the tower carry commemorative plaques. The eastern one reads:

1897 THIS TOWER Was erected (and a sum of £650 devoted in aid of the nursing association) out of the public subscriptions raised to commemorate the DIAMOND JUBILEE of the reign of HER MAJESTY QUEEN VICTORIA. Foundation laid June 22nd 1897 by Alexander Carus Esq., J.P., Mayor.

The western plaque records the names of the mayor and local dignitaries involved in the building of the tower. It names Smith-Saville as architect, and omits mention of Ellison, the original designer.

The tower is described by Pevsner as "a stumpy, awkward piece", and by another author as "a phallic object … for all the world like something on the launching pad at Cape Canaveral", but praised by the BBC as "a majestic spectacle with an impressive weather-vane".

The tower is 85 feet (25.9 m) in height; Darwen Hill (also known as Beacon Hill) is 1,220 feet (370 metres) above sea-level. Walkers can climb to the top of the tower via the internal staircase. In theory they can see views of North Yorkshire, Morecambe Bay, Blackpool Tower, Cumbria, the Isle of Man, North Wales, Derbyshire, and elsewhere in Lancashire, although moorland mists can obscure the view.

In 1972 the tower was given Grade II listed building protection by the government. The citation reads:

Observation tower, 1897. Rock-faced sandstone. Late medieval style: octagonal tower 86ft high, incorporating a spiral staircase to observation decks and surrounded at the base by a buttressed open arcade carrying a low-level deck. Base has stone shield over each arch, a band above these, and a ramped parapet to the deck. Tower has Tudor-arched doorway to deck on west side, lancet stairlights, bracketed cornice, embattled parapet with cross-shaped arrowslits at the angles, and is surmounted by a lantern with domed cap and weathervane.

The tower has survived several threats to its continued existence. During the Second World War there was a suggestion that it should be demolished, as it was feared it could be a useful landmark for enemy bombers. In 1947 the original wooden turret on top of the tower was blown off in a gale, and there was discussion about demolishing the building. The dome was not replaced until 1971 when the tower was crowned once again, with a fibreglass dome.

The fibreglass dome came off during strong winds on 11 November 2010. A replacement powder-coated stainless steel dome made by WEC Group of Darwen, which cost more than £35,000, was winched into place by helicopter on 13 January 2012. During the 2020s a local campaign secured around £300,000 in funding to restore and weatherproof the tower for future generations. The town's Rotary Club built a Lego model of the tower in the Darwen market hall to encourage donations and raise awareness, and the government contributed £250,000.

== Sources ==
- Eyre, Kathleen (1976). Lancashire Landmarks. Clapham, N. Yorkshire: Dalesman. ISBN 0-85-206370-9.
- Pevsner, Nikolaus (1969). The Buildings of England: North Lancashire. London: Penguin. OCLC 417961578.
- Salveson, Paul (1987). The People's Monuments: A Guide to Sites and Memorials in North West England. Manchester: Worker's Educational Association. ISBN 0-95-119121-7.
