= Round Loaf =

Late Neolithic or Bronze Age tumulus on Anglezarke Moor, England

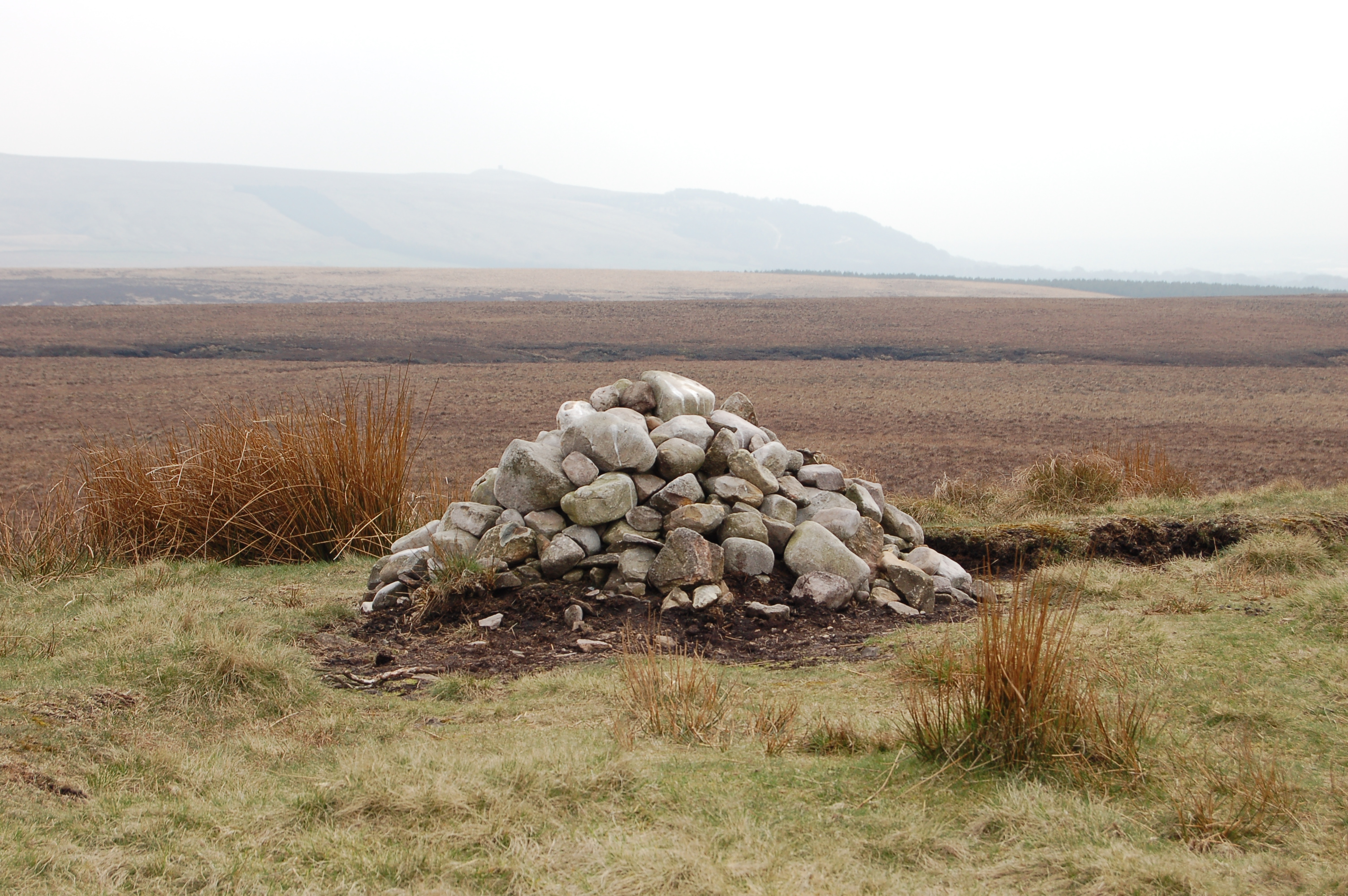
- The cairn on Round Loaf on Anglezarke Moor, looking towards Winter Hill

- Location in Chorley Borough Location in Lancashire
- 53°39′32.5″N 2°32′57.29″W
- Type: Round barrow
- Periods: Neolithic or Bronze Age
- Location: Near Anglezarke and Chorley
- Region: Lancashire, England

Site notes
- Condition: intact

Round Loaf is a Late Neolithic or Bronze Age tumulus on Anglezarke Moor in the West Pennine Moors near Chorley in Lancashire, England. The bowl barrow is a scheduled monument considered to be of national importance. It was first scheduled in March 1954. The structure is aligned between Great Hill and Pikestones.

== Background ==
Round Loaf is one of 10,000 bowl barrows constructed between the Late Neolithic period and the late-Bronze Age (2400 - 1500 BC). They are funerary monuments in the form of earth or rubble mounds covering single or multiple burials. Some were surrounded by a ditch. Some are in isolated locations as is Round Loaf and some are grouped in cemeteries. They vary in size and regional variations show a range of different burial practices.

== Description ==
Round Loaf occupies a prominent landmark position on Anglezarke Moor. Some erosion has occurred on its summit. It has not been excavated and its archaeology is possibly undisturbed. The ancient monument includes an oval mound measuring 73 metres from north to south and 66 metres from east to west. It is constructed of earth and small stones to a height of from 3.6 to 5.5 metres. Flakes of flint have been found on the mound's summit.

== See also ==
- Scheduled monuments in Lancashire
