= Pikestones =

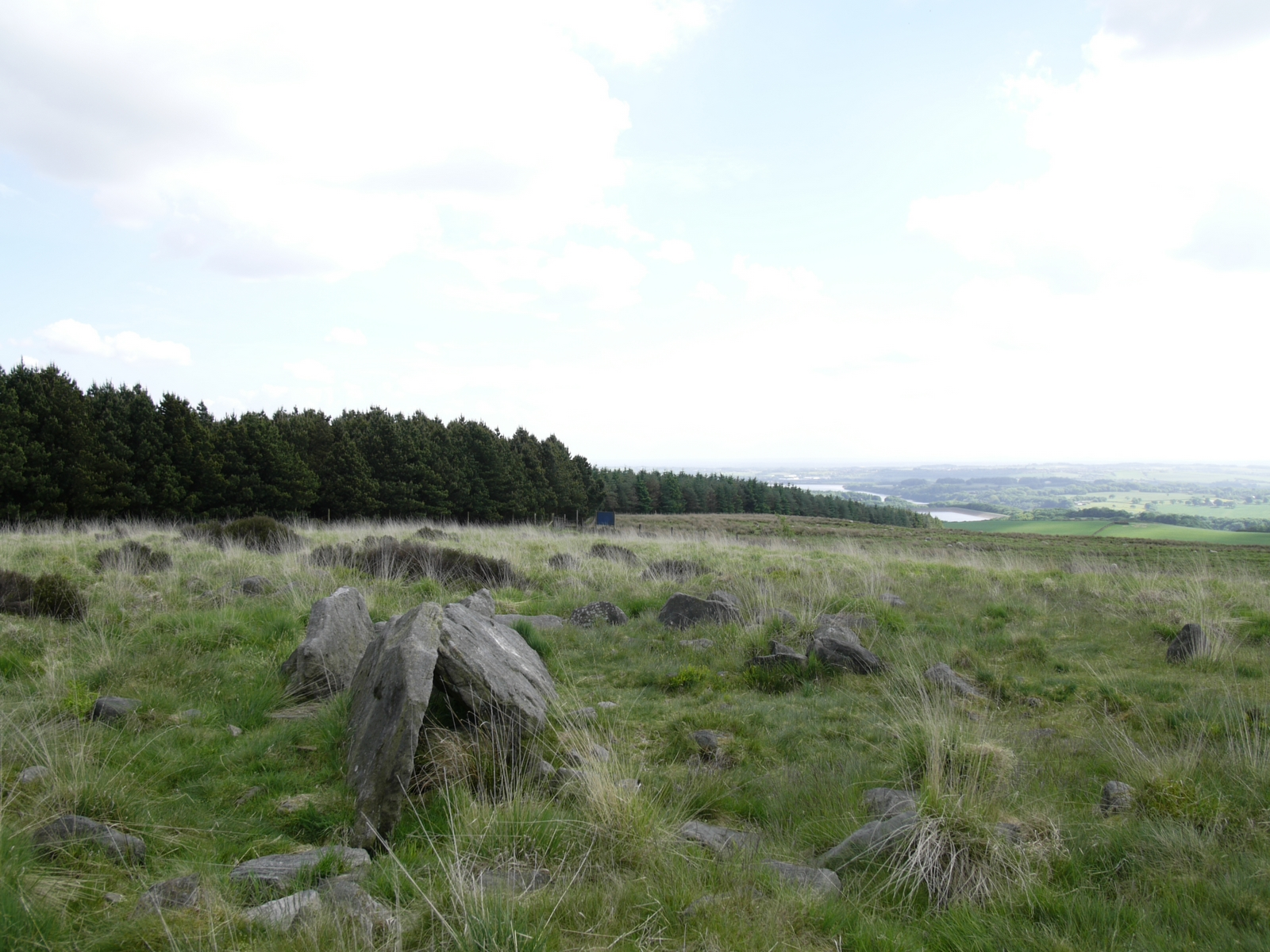
- Pikestones, looking south
- Interactive map of Pikestones
- 53°38′59.86″N 2°33′56.78″W
- Type: Chambered cairn
- Periods: Neolithic
- Location: near Anglezarke and Chorley
- Region: Lancashire, England

Site notes
- Condition: some damage

Pikestones is the remains of a Neolithic Burial Cairn, located on Anglezarke moor in Lancashire, England. The site is approximately 150 feet (45 metres) long and 60 feet (18 metres) across at its widest point. It consisted of one burial chamber constructed of large upright slabs, capped by two lintel slabs, forming a chamber of 15 feet (4.5 metres) long, 3 feet (0.9 metres) wide and 3 feet (0.9 metres) high, covered by a huge mound of stones and turves. The cairn was aligned almost exactly North-South, with the burial chamber under the wider northern end. At the northern edge of the cairn, a double wall could be made out, curving inwards to form an entrance to a forecourt.

Today the cairn has been badly robbed and the main features are the five large gritstone slabs, the remains of the burial chamber.

Surprisingly, evidence suggests [which evidence] that the bodies were not interred directly in the tomb, but were left outside, perhaps at the entrance to the cairn, for birds and wild animals to consume the flesh and then, probably after elaborate ceremonies, the bones were placed inside the chamber.

Pikestones is the earliest man-made structure in the area and only one other chambered tomb has been found in Lancashire. The monument must have taken an immense amount of labour to construct and like most long barrows was erected in a prominent position, located on a ridge at a height of just over 900 feet (276 metres). This gave the Neolithic builders excellent views, and made the structure visible from a wide area of the Lancashire plain, perhaps warning other people that the land belonged to the builders.

== See also ==
- Round Loaf
- Scheduled monuments in Lancashire
