= Henry Trigg =

Henry Trigg may refer to:

- Henry Trigg (public servant) (1791–1882), superintendent of public works in Western Australia
- Henry Trigg (testator) (c. 1667–1724), English grocer noted for his eccentric will
- Henry Stirling Trigg (1860–1919), Western Australian architect
