= Trinity Church, Perth =

Church in Perth, Western Australia

Trinity Church
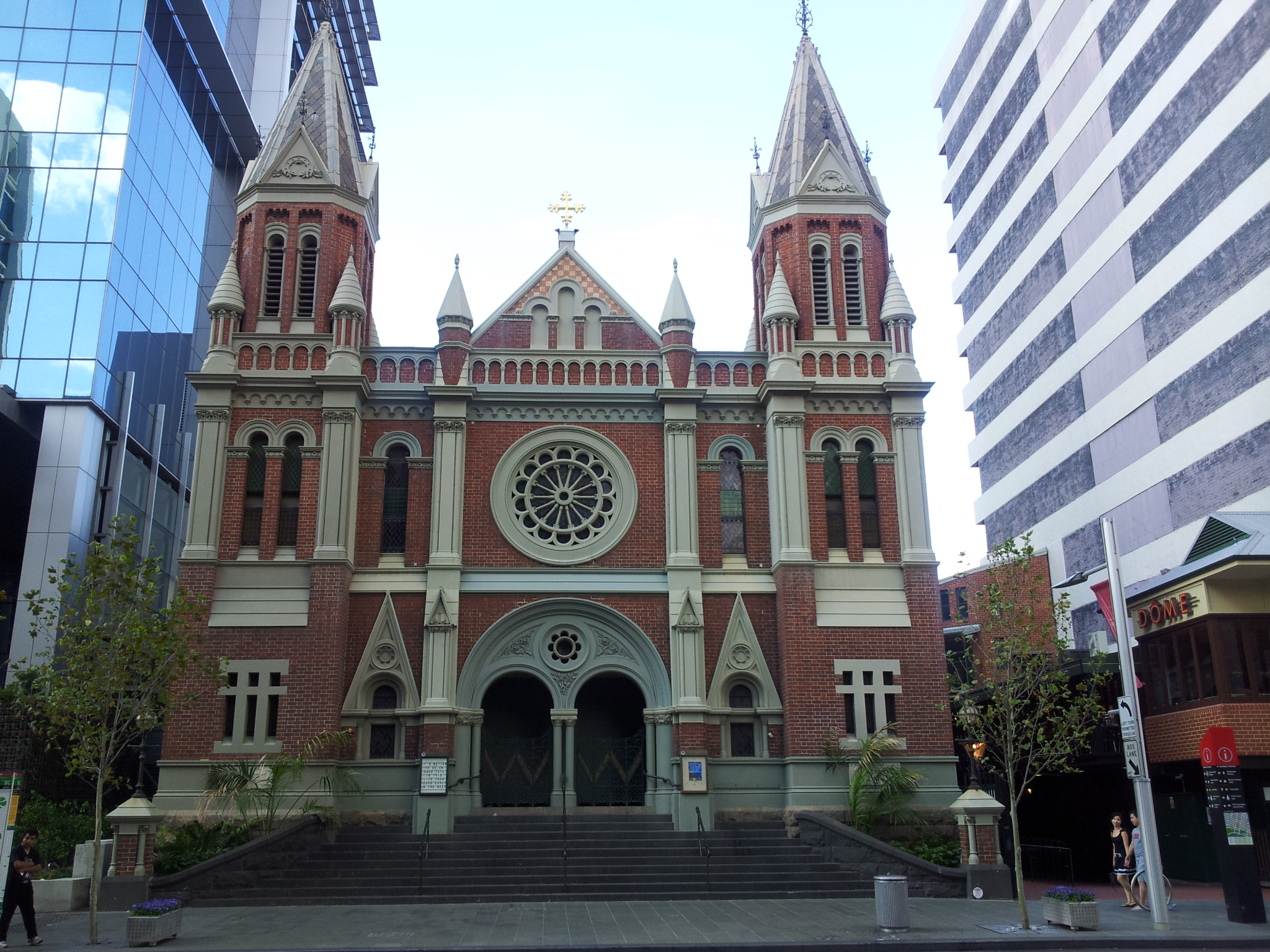
- St Georges Terrace facade of Trinity Church
- Trinity Church
- 31°57′18″S 115°51′29″E
- Address: 72 St Georges Terrace, Perth, Western Australia
- Country: Australia
- Denomination: Uniting (since 1977)
- Previous denomination: Congregational (1893 – 1977)
- Website: www.perthunitingchurch.org.au/trinity-church

History
- Status: Church
- Founded: 22 March 1893
- Founder: William Robson
- Dedicated: December 1893

Architecture
- Functional status: Active
- Architect: Henry Stirling Trigg
- Architectural type: Church
- Style: Romanesque Revival
- Construction cost: A£6,100

Specifications
- Capacity: 750 people

Western Australia Heritage Register
- Official name: Trinity Uniting Church Group
- Type: State Registered Place
- Designated: 6 September 1996
- Reference no.: 2105

Register of the National Estate
- Official name: Trinity Church Group
- Type: Historic (defunct register)
- Designated: 25 March 1986
- Reference no.: 10385
- Place File Number: 5/11/020/0087

Trinity Church is a Uniting church located at 72 St Georges Terrace in Perth, Western Australia. Commenced in 1893, the former Congregational church is one of the oldest church buildings in the City of Perth, and one of the few remaining 19th-century colonial buildings in the city.

== History ==
The Trinity Church congregation was established by Henry Trigg, a practising Congregationalist, who arrived in the Swan River Colony in 1829. Trigg initially attended the first Anglican Church, where he was a choirmaster. He later joined the Wesleyans, but from 1843 he held prayer meetings in the Congregational tradition in his own home.

=== First church building ===
In 1845 a number of the Congregationalists met to discuss the building of a chapel, and a £3 subscription was agreed upon. Following this a site in William Street was obtained and on 6 September 1846 the first Congregational Chapel was opened. Within twelve months the building was enlarged to seat nearly 200 people. In the following six years, Trigg conducted all the services until, in 1852, the London Missionary Society sent out the Reverend James Leonard to be the first ordained Congregational minister. Leonard stayed for three years before leaving the congregation in 1855. In 1858 the Congregational Church closed until the early 1860s, when Trigg set about reviving the cause. In October 1862 the Reverend James Innes became pastor of the Perth congregation.

=== Second church building ===
In 1863, the congregation decided to build a chapel in St Georges Terrace as the premises in William Street were too small. Land was purchased for £350. The architect of the new church was Richard Roach Jewell. Governor John Hampton laid the cornerstone on 10 May 1864. The church was constructed by Thomas Smith and William Buggins, in 1865, at a cost of £1,400, with the use of convict labour. The building was constructed out of handmade bricks laid in a Flemish bond pattern. It was a simple building, 54 ft (16 m) long, 34 ft (10 m) wide, 70 ft (21 m) high, with a timber roof. In 1872 a hall, known as the Schoolroom, also designed by Jewell, measuring 52 ft (16 m) by 28 ft (8.5 m) and 16 ft (4.9 m) high was built to the rear of the church, for a cost of £550. A ceiling was added to the 1865 church building in 1879.

In October 1884, the congregation decided to build a commercial building on the Hay Street frontage of the property. The architect was Henry Stirling Trigg (the grandson of Henry Trigg and the first locally trained architect to practise in Western Australia), and a contract was accepted from Robert Henry Hester to construct the buildings for £1,056.

=== Third church building ===
On 4 August 1892, the proposal was put that a new church be constructed, in front of the existing one, at a proposed cost of £5,100, with the erection of an adjoining suite of offices to fund the building of the church. This was accepted and Trinity Church was dedicated in December 1893 and opened in 1894. The plans and specifications were prepared by Henry Trigg and the contractors were Bunning Brothers at a contract price of £6,100. The design for the new church provided accommodation for 750 people on the ground floor and for 100 in the galleries. Additional funds of £500 were budgeted for furnishings, and £500 for an organ. The new building was designed for the minister's voice to be heard from every part of it. The church was to have been furnished with chairs, but owing to the slope in the floor, locally crafted pews were substituted. The foundation stone for Trinity Church was laid by Governor William Robson on 22 March 1893. Dr Bevan from the Collins Street Congregational Church, Melbourne came to Perth to conduct the opening services. The ceremony was attended by John and Lady Forrest, James Lee Steere, Alexander Forrest (Mayor of Perth) and a crowd of the leading citizens of Perth and Fremantle. John Forrest proclaimed that such "..a magnificent building would be an ornament to the principal street of the city. Such an undertaking showed that the people were progressing materially and morally and that progress was the order of the day."

The Church also commissioned a two-storey office building, Trinity House, adjacent to the new church building and facing St Georges Terrace, at a cost of £1,500. In 1900, Trinity Hall was renovated at a cost of £130.

In 1904, a double-storey building known as the Guild Rooms, containing a caretaker's cottage and gymnasium, was constructed at the rear of the office building for £1,637.

== Trinity Buildings and Trinity Arcade ==
Trinity Arcade
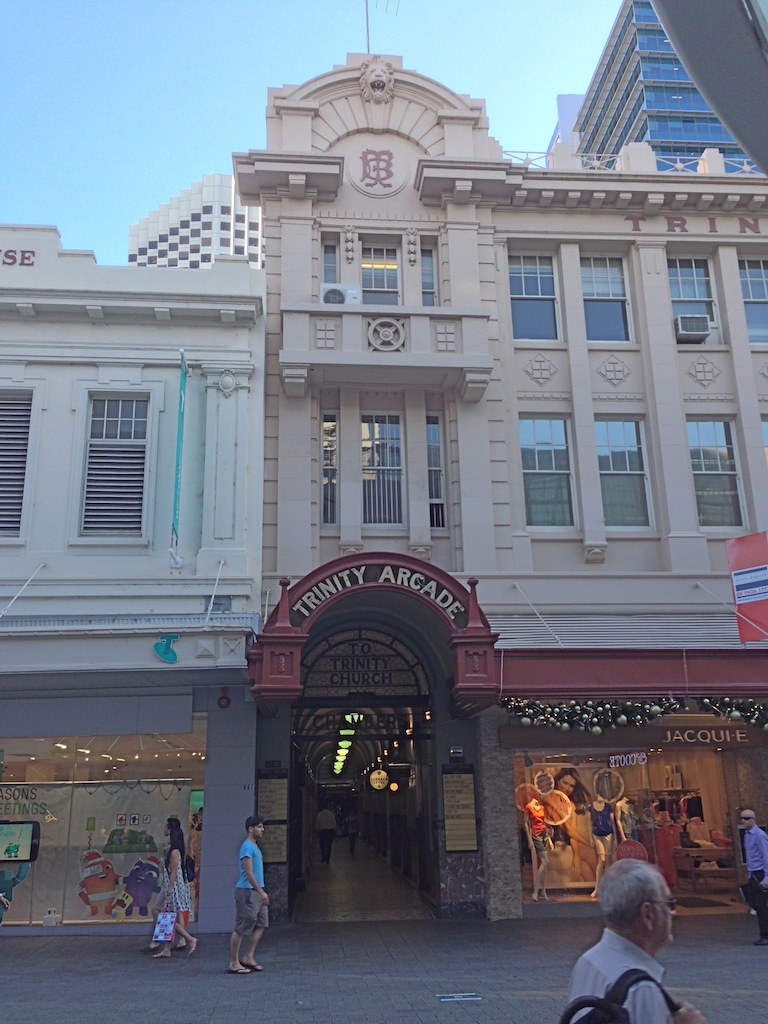
- Trinity Building and Trinity Arcade entry on Hay Street
- Location: Perth, Western Australia
- Coordinates: 31°57′17″S 115°51′30″E
- Address: 671 Hay Street, Perth
- Opened: 1927 (Single Level); 1981 (Multi Level)
- Architect: James Hine
- Floors: 2
- Website: Official website

Western Australia Heritage Register
- Official name: Trinity Building
- Type: Heritage Council Assessed
- Designated: 18 April 1989
- Part of: 4281
- Reference no.: 1996

Register of the National Estate
- Official name: Trinity Church Group
- Type: Historic (defunct register)
- Designated: 25 March 1986
- Reference no.: 10385
- Place File Number: 5/11/020/0087

Further developments took place at the rear of the property, facing Hay Street, in 1923 with the construction of Trinity Buildings and Trinity Arcade. This building is the most prominent of architect James Hine's works, and construction by E. Allwood was completed in 1927. It is a three-storey building with a basement, and has a public-access pedestrian arcade running down the east side (giving access between Hay Street and St Georges Terrace).

In 1970, the office building on the eastern side of the site was demolished and in 1981 a shopping arcade developed, linking Trinity Church with Trinity Buildings in Hay Street and with St Georges Terrace. The redevelopment of the arcade in 1981 provided a range of levels of pedestrian access that run along the eastern side of the church buildings and provide courtyards and through ways for the public, from which they can admire the architecture and avail themselves of the services the church provides. The redevelopment won the Civic Design Award for 1982–83 for its contribution to the civic amenity of central Perth. The funds received for leasing the site in 1981 permitted restoration of Trinity Hall, the Schoolroom and Trinity Church. Trinity Hall is used as a church hall and school for senior citizens. The Schoolroom is used as the Trinity lunch room.

In 1977, the Congregational Church combined with the Methodist and Presbyterian Churches to become the Uniting Church of Australia. Trinity Church, since 1996, has been owned by the Uniting Church.

== Built form ==
Trinity Hall (1865) is constructed out of handmade bricks laid in a Flemish bond pattern. The building is constructed in a modest rendition of the Victorian Academic style of architecture and is decorated externally with modest tourelles in cement render and has a rendered string course. It is a simple building with a timber roof. The interior walls are of white render and there are small stained glass windows with simple coloured panes, with a large trefoil window facing south. It has jarrah woodwork throughout.

The Schoolroom (1872) is to the rear of Trinity Hall and is built of similar brickwork to Trinity Hall with a timber roof.

Trinity Church (1893) has probably the most distinctive architecture style amongst the churches in the City of Perth, which are predominantly in the Gothic idiom. Trinity is of Romanesque Revival style. The church follows the fall of the land, with its foundations stepping southwards to St Georges Terrace. The main facade of the church incorporates twin flanking towers capped by octagonal spires roofed in slate, a rose window and large entrance portal. The interior is of note for its galleries and their cast iron balustrading and stained glass by Ashwin of Sydney.

== Current uses ==
The church is currently the home of the Trinity worshiping community of the Uniting Church in the city, part of the Uniting Church in Australia.

== Heritage value ==
Trinity Church was entered into the (since defunct) Register of the National Estate by the Australian Heritage Commission on 25 March 1986 and classified by the National Trust of Western Australia on 5 October 1970. On 6 September 1996 it was placed on the permanent State Heritage Register.
