= Zimpel =

Zimpel is a surname of German origin. Notable people with the surname include:

- Charles Frederick Zimpel (1801–1879), German-born, US-based architect
- Sylke Zimpel (born 1959), German composer, choral conductor and lecturer
- William James Zimpel (1859–1923), Australian furniture manufacturer and merchant, and politician
