= Freemasons Hotel =

Freemasons Hotel may refer to:

- Freemasons Hotel, Bridgetown
- Freemasons Hotel, Geraldton
- Freemasons Hotel (Toodyay)
- Palace Hotel, Perth – built on the site of Freemasons' Hotel in Perth
- Sail and Anchor Hotel, Fremantle – originally named Freemasons Hotel
- Royal George Hotel and Ruddle's Building, Brisbane – formerly known as Freemasons Hotel

== See also ==
- Freemasons' Tavern, London
