= Long gallery =

Type of long, narrow room

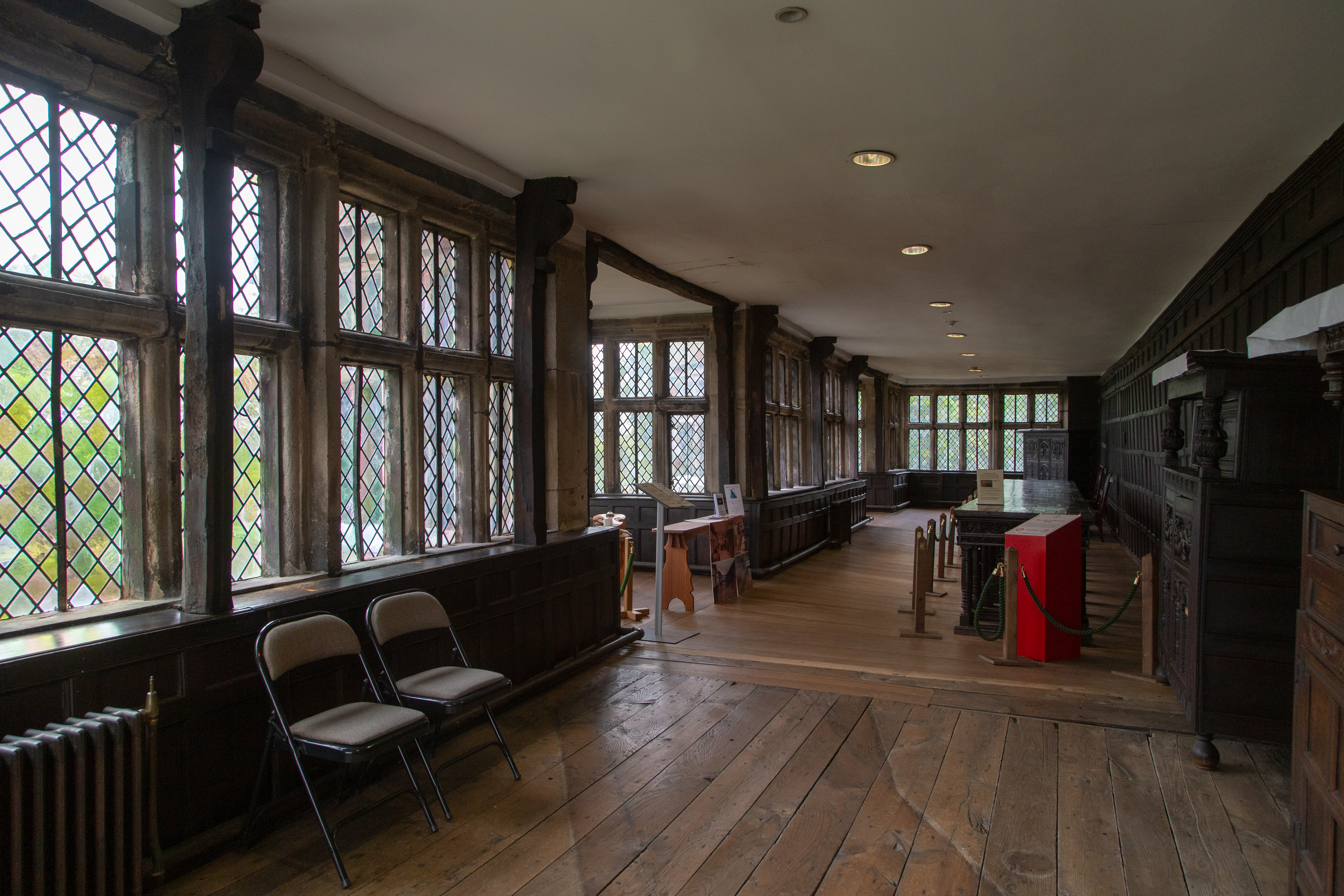
Astley Hall, Chorley

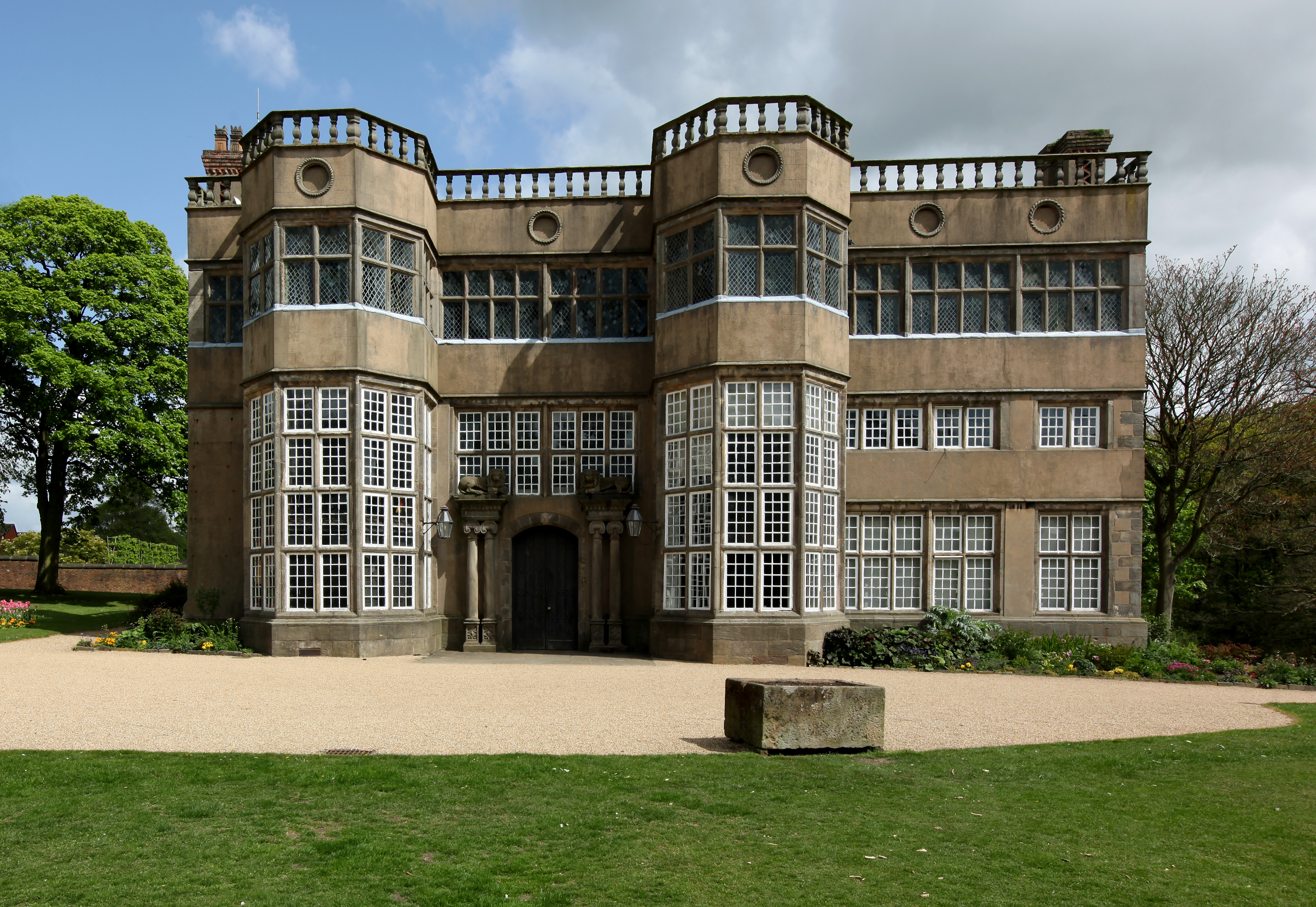
The windows of the long gallery are evident on the top floor at Astley Hall, Chorley.

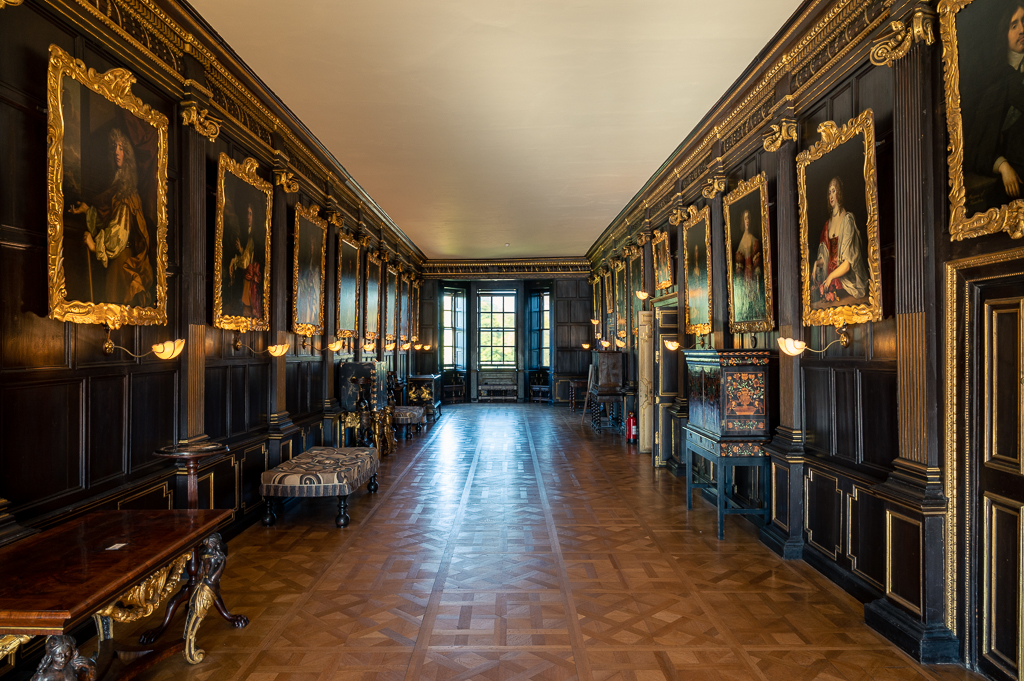
The Long Gallery at Ham House; this only has windows at the ends.

In architecture, a long gallery is a long, narrow room, often with a high ceiling. In Britain, long galleries were popular in Elizabethan and Jacobean houses. They were normally placed on the highest reception floor — the uppermost level designed for entertaining guests (usually above the hall and other ground floor rooms) — of English country houses, usually running along a side of the house, with windows on one side and at the ends giving views, and doors to other rooms on the other. They served several purposes, and were perhaps especially used by the women of the family. They were used for entertaining guests (probably only the more favoured ones), for taking exercise in the form of walking when the weather was inclement, for displaying art collections, especially portraits of the family and royalty, and acting as a corridor.

A long gallery has the appearance of a spacious corridor, but it was designed as a room to be used in its own right, not just as a means of passing from one room to another, though many served as this too. In the 16th century, the seemingly obvious concept of the corridor had not been introduced to British domestic architecture; rooms were entered from outside or by passing from one room to another. Doors off the long gallery led to family spaces such as bedrooms, studies and parlours.

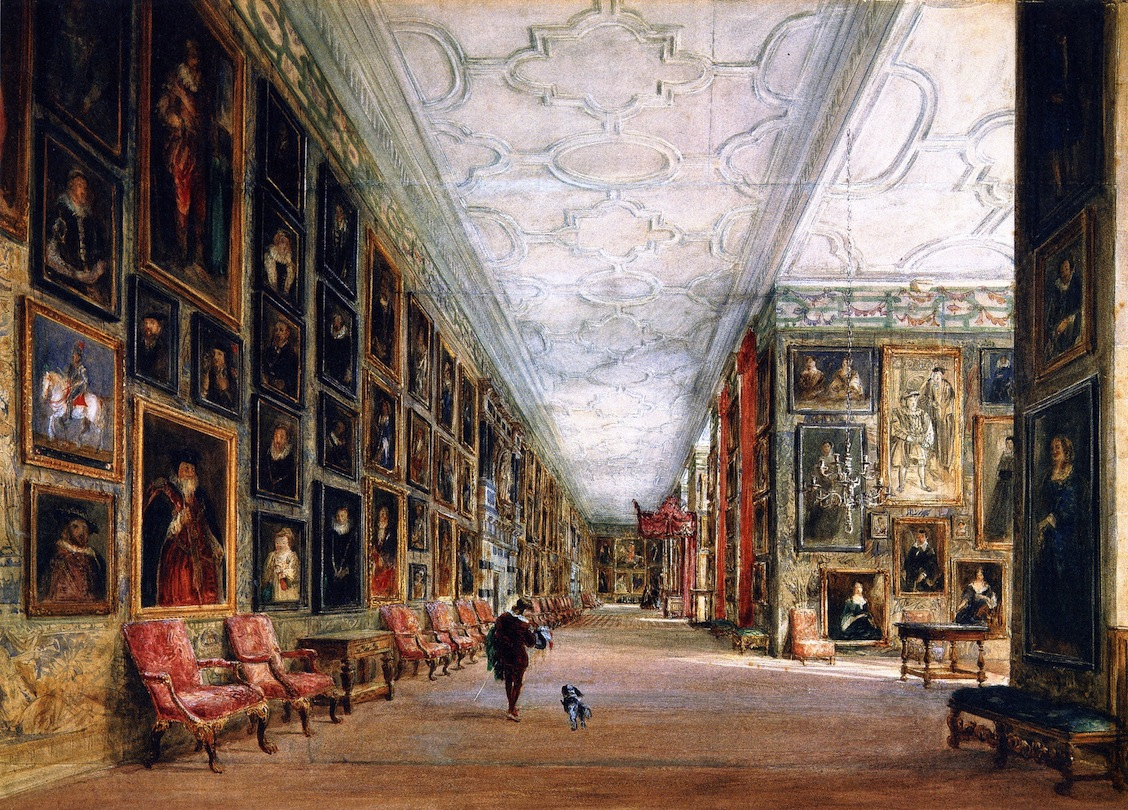
Hardwick Hall's long gallery, probably the largest to survive, painted by David Cox the Elder, 1811

Later, long galleries were built, sometimes in a revivalist spirit, as at Harlaxton Manor, an extravagant early-Victorian house in Jacobean style, and sometimes to house a large art collection, as at Buckingham Palace, which has a long interior space lit from above, called the Picture Gallery.

== Examples ==
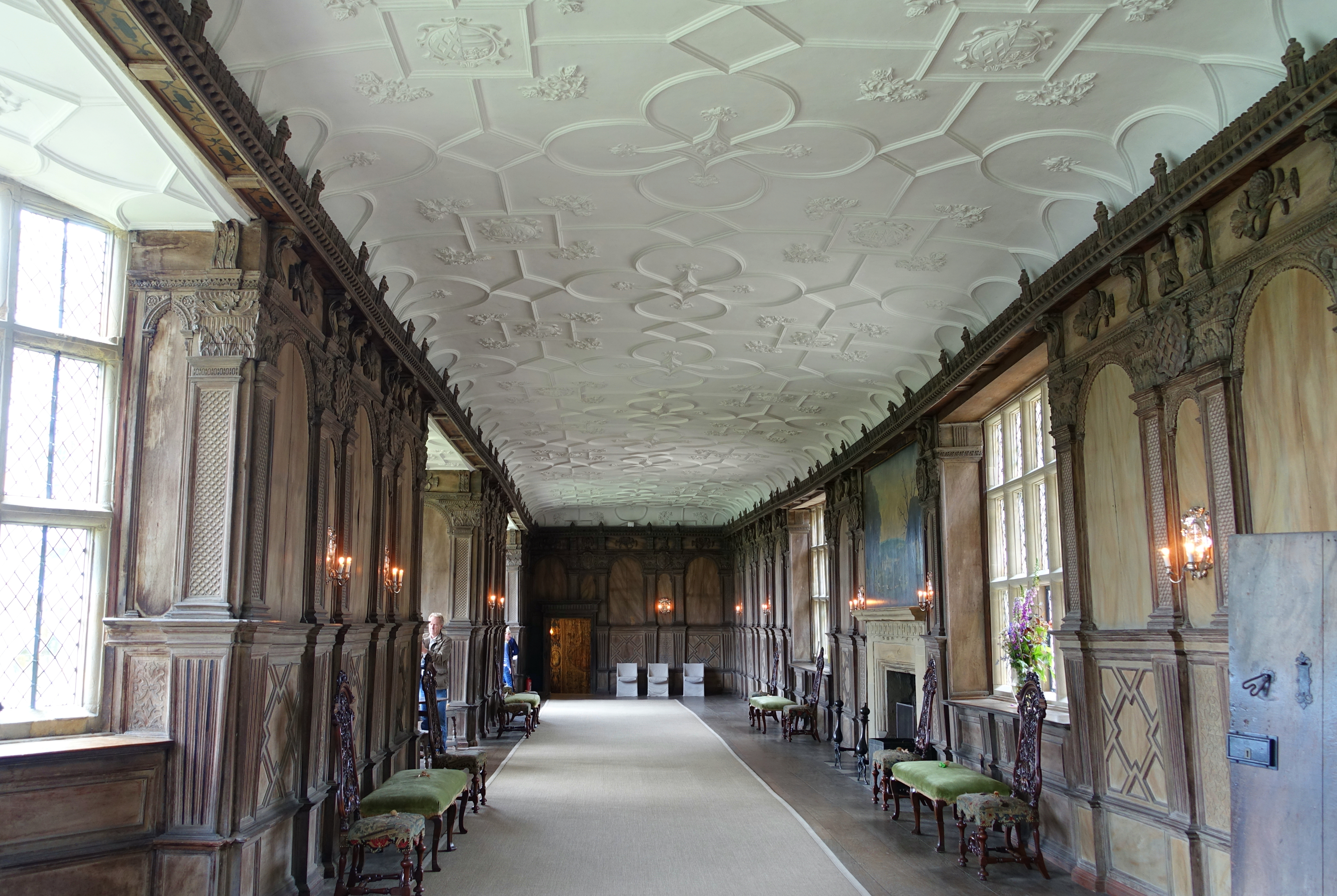
Haddon Hall's long gallery

Notable long galleries in the United Kingdom can be seen at:

- Althorp, Northamptonshire
- Apethorpe Hall, Northamptonshire
- Aston Hall, Birmingham
- Astley Hall, Chorley
- Blickling Hall, Norfolk
- Burghley House, near Stamford, Lincolnshire (converted into separate rooms in the late 17th century such as rooms known as Queen Elizabeth I Bedroom and Blue silk Dressing room)
- Broughton Castle, Oxfordshire
- Burton Agnes Hall, Yorkshire
- Burton Constable Hall, Yorkshire
- Castle Ashby House, Northamptonshire, now 18th-century in style.
- Charlton House, London
- Croome Court, Worcestershire, Adam interior
- Haddon Hall, Derbyshire
- Ham House, London – compact and running from front to rear
- Hardwick Hall, Derbyshire – one of the largest
- Harewood House
- Harlaxton Manor,
- Hatfield House, Hertfordshire
- Hever Castle, Kent
- Little Moreton Hall, Cheshire
- Longleat House, Wiltshire – the long gallery is now called the Saloon
- Lyme Park, Cheshire
- Montacute House, Somerset
- Osterley Park, London
- Parham Park, West Sussex
- Penshurst Place, Kent
- Powis Castle, Welshpool, Wales
- Scone Palace, Perthshire
- Sudbury Hall, Derbyshire
- Syon House, London
- Temple Newsam House, Yorkshire – Jacobean long gallery, later modified and now called the picture gallery
- Welbeck Abbey
- Windsor Castle – Elizabethan long gallery; later converted by William IV, along with adjacent rooms, to house the Royal Library
