= Frank Hall Standish =

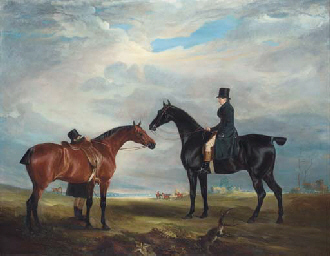
- Frank Hall Standish with the Quorn Hunt by John Ferneley, Snr, 1819
- Born: Frank Hall; 2 October 1799; Darlington, County Durham
- Died: 1840 (aged 40–41); Cádiz
- Parents: Charlotte Key; Anthony Hall

Frank Hall Standish (born Frank Hall, 2 October 1799 – 1840) was an English landowner and an art and book collector.

== Biography ==
He was born in 1799 at Darlington, County Durham to Charlotte Key and her husband Anthony Hall, the latter dying later the same year. At the age of thirteen he successfully claimed the estate of his distant cousin Sir Frank Standish, Bt., (as the great grandson of Margaret Standish, Sir Frank's aunt), which included the manor of Duxbury and Duxbury Hall near Chorley, Lancashire. He attained the right to bear his benefactor's surname and arms, but failed in his attempts to succeed to the baronetcy which was extinguished.

During his adult years Standish travelled extensively on the continent, spending much of his very substantial income on the purchase of art works and books. He lived chiefly in Seville. He published a number of long poems, and books of travel and topography.

Frank Hall Standish died in 1840 at Cádiz, unmarried and probably without issue, and was buried in the Standish crypt at St Laurence's, Chorley. The manor of Duxbury and the estates passed to his second cousin, William Standish Carr.

"Piqued at the English ministry's refusal to revive the baronetcy", however, or "as a mark of respect to the French" he gave his book and art collections to the French king Louis Philippe. Until the revolution of 1848, the art works were displayed in the Standish gallery in the Louvre. Subsequently, Louis Philippe reclaimed them as his private property and the whole was sold in 1852–3, the drawings, etc., in Paris and the paintings in London. The books passed to his son, Henri d'Orléans, duc d'Aumale and formed part of the collection which he bequeathed to the Institut de France along with the Château de Chantilly. They are still held there in the Musée Condé.

== Publications ==
- The life of Voltaire : with interesting particulars respecting his death, and anecdotes and characters of his contemporaries. London, 1821.
- The maid of Jaen, a poem. With notes and general remarks ... New edition. Chorley: printed & sold by C. Robinson, 1832
- Timon, a poem, in two cantos. Chorley: C. Robinson, 1833.
- The bride of Palencia, a poem. London, 1837
- The shores of the Mediterranean. London, 1837.
- Notices of the Northern Capitals of Europe. London : Black & Armstrong, 1838
- Poems : The maid of Jaen; Timon; and The bride of Palencia. London, 1838
- Seville and its vicinity. London : Black and Armstrong, 1840.
- Catalogue des tableaux, dessins, et gravures de la collection Standish, légués au Roi par M. F. H. Standish. Paris, 1842
