= James Hine =

James Hine (1848–1928) was a prominent architect in Perth, Western Australia. He was born in Ludlow, England. Hine worked there with the architect John Grovsner as his assistant from 1865 until 1877, and subsequently started his own practice. Hine moved to Cape Town, South Africa in 1881, then to Bathurst, New South Wales in 1883, before settling in Perth, Western Australia, in 1895, where he remained until his death in January 1928.

Buildings designed by Hine include Methodist Ladies' College, Wesley College, and the Trinity Buildings.
