= Phineas Seeligson's =

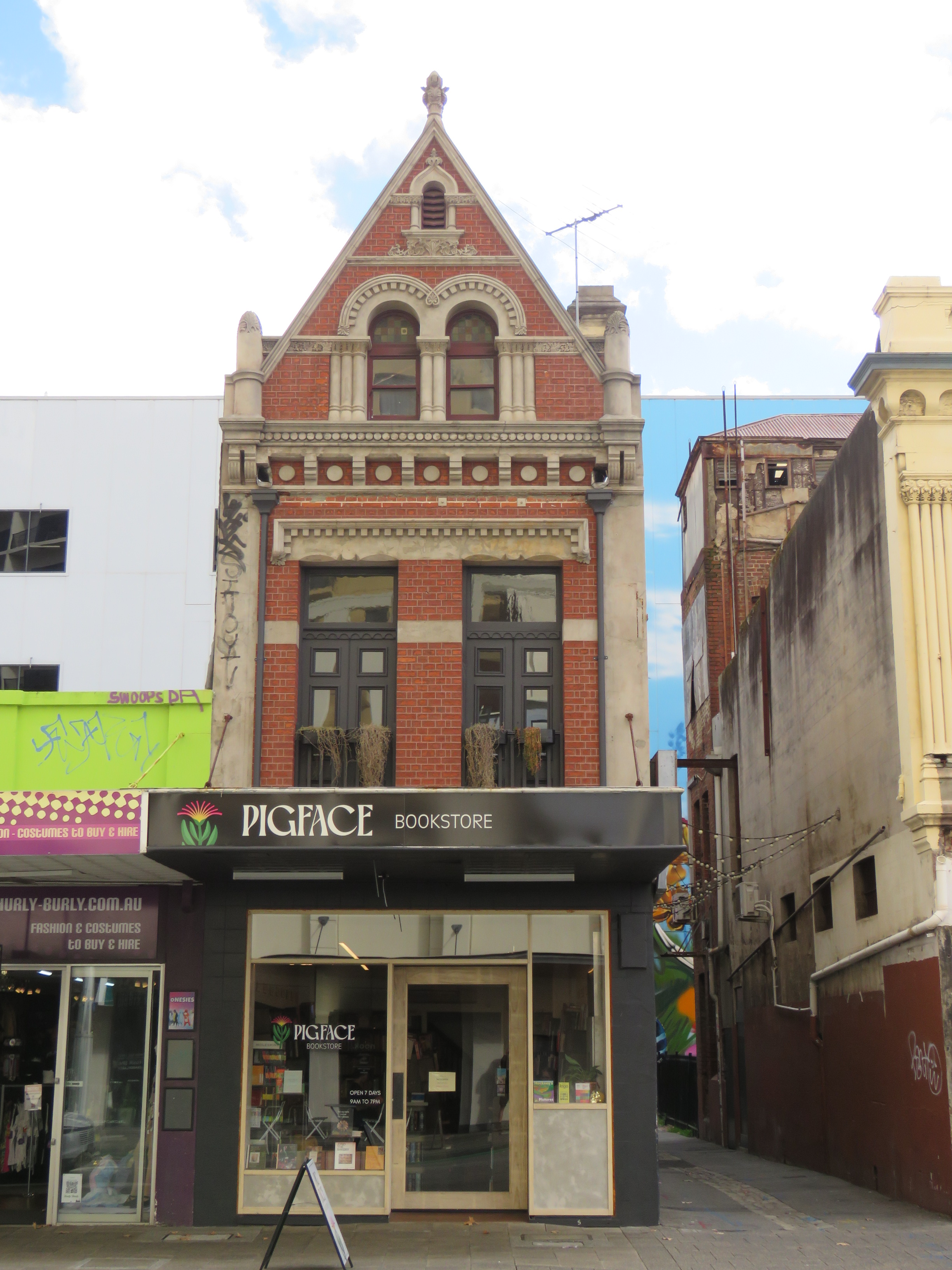
- The Phineas Seeligson's building in June 2026
- Interactive map of the Phineas Seeligson's area

General information
- Type: Heritage listed building
- Location: Perth, Western Australia
- Coordinates: 31.95254°S 115.8610°E

Western Australia Heritage Register
- Type: State Registered Place
- Designated: 14 July 2015
- Reference no.: 1961

Phineas Seeligson's is a heritage-listed building in Perth, Western Australia. Located at 143 Barrack Street in the city's central business district, it has also been known as Toastface, and Atomic Sky as Studio StartUp.

== History ==
The building was purpose-built in 1894 for Phineas Seeligson, a pawnbroker and prominent member of the local Jewish community. He had, since at least the previous year, been operating from 201–203 Murray Street, and was one of only two pawnbrokers listed in Perth. The building was designed by architect Henry Stirling Trigg, and opened as a second branch of Seeligson's pawnbroking business, under the name City Loan Office.

By 1898 Seeligson had sold the business to A. T. Jones, but remained the owner of the building. Upon Seeligson's death in Mount Lawley in 1935, his will left money for various charities, with the bulk of his estate given to the Jewish community for the "assistance of poor and indigent members of the Jewish community in Western Australia, and for the fuller education of Jewish graduates of the University of Western Australia whose parents are unable to provide for such education". A clause in the will stipulated that his trustees were not to sell the property for 30 years, as Seeligson was convinced it would increase in value and be of greater benefit to his specified charitable causes.

Jones ran the pawnbroking shop with his brother-in-law Ernest Dyson until 1930, during which time Dyson and his family lived in a residence above the shop. Over the following 30 years, various businesses were located in the building's shop, initially the Chinese restaurant Cafe Nanking – one of the first in Perth – which opened on 22 November 1930. It was later used by a butcher, naturopath, as record store, and in the 1950s, an ANZ bank branch. Other businesses used the premises until the 1990s, including a bridal shop and the World Record Club.

By 2008, the building had been mostly unused for approximate 50 years, apart from the ground-floor shop, where a hairdresser was located. Peter Rossdeutcher bought the building, and undertook conservation works which were awarded a Certificate of Merit in the City of Perth's 2014 biennial Heritage Awards. The seven-year restoration project included completing a detailed conservation plan, repairing the upper level's Romanesque facade, and finding new tenants. The Toastfaced Grillah cafe moved into the rear of the property, accessed via Grand Lane, and became a popular venue. In 2015, the front shop was still the hairdresser, and the rest of the building was used as a space for meetings, a filming venue and studio for bands, and shared office space. As of 2026, the building is used by Pigface Bookstore.

== Description ==
The building at 143 Barrack Street, on the west side of the street, is a three storey tuck-pointed brick building, situated amongst single and two storey buildings from the same era. The building has a basement level, and the roof is made from corrugated iron. Its design has elements of the Federation Romanesque architectural style, including a high-pitched gable, and an ornamented stucco facade. The front of the building has a suspended metal lined awning, which replaced the original two-storey verandah in the mid-20th century. A timber staircase in the centre of the building provides access from the ground floor to the upper levels; a second one at the rear gives access to the basement.
