= Listed buildings in Chorley =

Chorley is a market town in the borough of Chorley, Lancashire, England. The town itself is unparished, and this list contains the listed buildings in the unparished area. Outside the town are parished areas, and each of these has a separate list for its listed buildings. The unparished area contains 53 buildings that are recorded in the National Heritage List for England as designated listed buildings. Of these, one is listed at Grade I, the highest of the three grades, five are at Grade II*, the middle grade, and the others are at Grade II, the lowest grade.

The major building in the town is Astley Hall; this and structures associated with it are listed. Before the arrival of industry in the 19th century, much of the area was rural, and a number of the listed buildings are, or originated as, farmhouses or farm buildings. Industry itself has resulted in only two listed buildings, a surviving cotton mill chimney, and loomshops in the basements of a row of houses. The Leeds and Liverpool Canal and the former Bolton and Preston Railway pass through the town, and there are listed structures associated with both of these, The other listed buildings include churches, chapels and houses, and structures associated with them, and public houses.

== Key ==
Grade	Criteria
I	Buildings of exceptional interest, sometimes considered to be internationally important
II*	Particularly important buildings of more than special interest
II	Buildings of national importance and special interest

== Buildings ==
Name and location	Photograph	Date	Notes	Grade
St Laurence's Church; 53.65473°N 2.63258°W		15th century	The oldest part of the church is the tower, much of the rest of the church resulting from a major rebuilding in 1859–61, with further alterations in 1913–14. The church is in stone with slate roofs, and it is in Perpendicular style. It consists of a nave, aisles, a south porch, a chancel with a south transept and a south chapel, and a west tower. The tower is in three stages, with buttresses, a west doorway, a south stair turret, gargoyles, and an embattled parapet. On the roof of the nave is a Sanctus bellcote. The aisles are also battlemented and have gargoyles.	II*
Astley Hall; 53.65946°N 2.64530°W		15th century	Originally a manor house, later used as a museum and art gallery. The older parts are timber-framed on a stone plinth, and form the current north and west ranges. During the 17th century the south range was rebuilt in brick (now rendered) with stone dressings. There were further additions in the 19th century. The south front is in three storeys, and has an entrance flanked by full-height five-sided bay windows. To the right of the right bay window, and in the top storey, are mullioned and transomed windows. Above this is a parapet with rosettes, which is surmounted by a balustrade.	I
Higher Healey Farm House; 53.66420°N 2.59754°W	—	1612	The former farmhouse has been altered by the demolition of an attached shippon and the addition of a modern cross-wing (not included in the listing). The house is in sandstone with a concrete tile roof, in two storeys with an attic, and with two bays. The windows are mullioned or mullioned and transomed. In the gable wall is a hood mould above which is a datestone. On the south front is a corbelled garderobe.	II*
Barn, Duxbury Hall; 53.63103°N 2.62584°W		Early 17th century (or before)	A cruck-framed barn with brick gable walls, side walls in sandstone, and a stone-slate roof. It has a rectangular seven-bay plan with a central large wagon door. It also contains smaller doorways, windows, and mullioned ventilation openings. Inside are six full cruck trusses.	II
Lower Burgh Hall; 53.63595°N 2.64968°W	—	Early 17th century (or before)	A timber-framed farmhouse in two storeys. There are three bays, the outer bays acting as cross-wings, and having brick cladding. The roof is of stone-slate, and there is a timber-framed stair turret at the rear. On the front in the angle of the right wing is a single-storey stone porch. The windows are mullioned, and inside the stair turret is a garderobe.	II*
Burgh Hall Farmhouse; 53.63292°N 2.63835°W	—	Early 17th century (possibly)	The farmhouse was altered in the 18th century and was possibly originally timber-framed. The lower part of the walls are in stone and the upper parts in brick, with a roof mainly in stone-slate with some slate. The farmhouse has two storeys and an L-shaped plan, consisting of a three-bay range with a single-bay cross-wing. There is a single-storey porch in the angle with a round-headed opening. At the right end is a single-storey extension.	II
Crosse Hall Farmhouse and barn 53.65238°N 2.61143°W	—	1667	The former farm is in sandstone with a slate roof, it is in a square plan, and has two storeys and an attic. Two mullioned windows remain; the others have been altered. Above the door is an inscribed lintel. Attached to the right side is a barn, probably dating from the 18th century; this has a central segmental-headed wagon doorway with voussoirs.	II
Halliwell House; 53.64432°N 2.61912°W	—	1667	A former farmhouse in rendered stone with a stone-slate roof. It has two storeys and an L-shaped plan, with three bays, the third bay projecting backwards as a cross-wing. On the front is a two-storey gabled porch with a datestone above the entrance. All the windows are altered casements. Inside is an inglenook, a bressumer, and a timber-framed partition.	II
Gillibrand Hall Barn; 53.64673°N 2.64634°W	—	1669	Originally a barn, later used as a workshop with a dwelling in the left, it is in sandstone with a roof of slate and stone-slate. The building has a rectangular plan in five bays, the fifth bay having two storeys and an attic. In the fifth bay are doorways in both storeys with external steps leading to the upper doorway. The windows in this bay and on the right side are mullioned. Elsewhere there are wagon doorways under a canopy, and ventilation slits, now glazed.	II*
The Manor House; 53.65355°N 2.63484°W	—	Late 17th century (probable)	Originally one house, later divided into two dwellings, it is in rendered sandstone on a high plinth, with a slate roof. The building has a U-shaped plan, in three bays with receding wings. There are two storeys with attics in the wings. Most of the windows are sashes, with a stair window on the front. Inside are timber-framed partitions.	II
Unitarian Chapel; 53.65672°N 2.63193°W	—	1725	The much altered chapel is in stone with a stone-slate roof. It consists of a rectangular single cell, with a 20th-century red brick apse. There are two doorways in the east end that flank cross windows, similar windows at the rear, and in the north gable is an arched window containing Y-tracery.	II
Coach house, Duxbury Hall; 53.63127°N 2.62505°W		Early 18th century (probable)	The coach house is in stone, apart from the left end, which is in brick, and it is roofed with concrete tiles. The building has two storeys, and a symmetrical front of seven bays. The central bay projects forward and has a pedimented gable and a round-headed arch with rusticated voussoirs, above which are three square windows and a bull's eye window. In the other bays the ground floor arches are lunettes.	II
Stable block, Duxbury Hall; 53.63083°N 2.62539°W		Early 18th century (probable)	The stable block is in sandstone with a hipped stone-slate roof. It is in two storeys, and has a rectangular plan. The central bay is gabled, with a clock face and a bellcote with a weathervane. The block contains wagon doorways, other doorways, and windows. In front of the first bay is a single-storey brick wagon house.	II
Hartwood Green Farmhouse; 53.67058°N 2.63163°W	—	Early 18th century (probable)	The former farmhouse is in sandstone with a slate roof, in two storeys with a rectangular two-bay plan. Above the door is a large plain lintel. The windows were mullioned, but have been altered. At the rear are two two-storey outshuts.	II
Cowling Farmhouse; 53.64483°N 2.60852°W	—	18th century	The former farmhouse is in stone with a slate roof, and has two storeys with an attic, and is in two bays. Flanking the doorway are sliding sash windows, and in the upper floor the windows are casements.	II
Coach house, Astley Hall; 53.65980°N 2.64628°W		Late 18th century (probable)	The coach house is in brick on a stone plinth with stone dressings and a hipped slate roof. It has two storeys, and is in an L-shaped plan, with a symmetrical front of nine bays. The central three bays project slightly forward, are pedimented, and contain a two-storey round-headed arch flanked by windows, and a bull's eye window in the pediment. The other bays each contains a rectangular window in the lower storey and a bull's eye window above.	II
Bagganley Bridge; 53.65974°N 2.61430°W		1790s (probable)	This is bridge No. 78,an accommodation bridge, carrying Bagganley Lane over the Leeds and Liverpool Canal. It is in stone, and consists of a single elliptical arch with triple keystones, parapets with rounded coping, and buttressed piers at the ends of the walls.	II
Canal bridge No. 75; 53.64207°N 2.61293°W		c. 1800	This is an accommodation bridge, carrying a track over the Leeds and Liverpool Canal. It is in gritstone, and consists of a single elliptical arch with a parapet. Some of the original stone paving remains.	II
Canal bridge No. 76; 53.65165°N 2.61346°W		c. 1800	The bridge carries Crosse Hall Lane over the Leeds and Liverpool Canal. It is in gritstone, and consists of a single elliptical arch with bands and parapets, and has buttressed piers at the ends.	II
Gateway, St Laurence's Church; 53.65495°N 2.63277°W		Late 18th or early 19th century	The gateway at the entrance to the church yard, now blocked, is in Gothick style. It is built in brick and stone, with a sandstone facing. The gateway has three bays with an arched doorway in the centre and a blind quatrefoil above. In the outer bays are blind arches and blind cruciform arrow slits. The central bay has a battlemented parapet.	II
Gillibrand Hall; 53.64567°N 2.64664°W	—	1807–08	A large house, later used as a nursing home, it is built in stone, and has two storeys. The house is in late Georgian style, and has a U-shaped plan, with a three-bay main block, and two receding service wings. The middle bay projects forward and has a panelled parapet. A modern pavilion has been built in front of the ground floor. On the right side is a porch with a cornice carried on Corinthian columns.	II
St Gregory's Church; 53.63874°N 2.63088°W		1814–15	A Roman Catholic church, with aisles added in 1831, and the north front dating from 1845. The aisles and north front are in stone, and the rest of the church is in brick. The north front is in Italian Renaissance style and contains a single-storey three-bay narthex with a round-headed central entrance, and statues in niches in the outer bays. Above the central bay is a pedimented storey with a niche containing a statue of Christ carrying the cross. Above this is a tower with a belfry surmounted by a belvedere with an ogee cap and a cross.	II
St George's Church; 53.65211°N 2.62925°W		1822–25	A Commissioners' church designed by Thomas Rickman in Early English style. It is built in stone with slate roofs, and consists of a nave and chancel in one cell with a clerestory, aisles, and a west tower. The tower is in four stages, and has buttresses, a west doorway, clock faces on three sides, and an embattled parapet with crocketed pinnacles. The windows are lancets.	II*
12 and 14 Park Road; 53.65716°N 2.63205°W	—	1824	A pair of houses in Classical style that have fronts of stone, brick elsewhere, and a slate roof. They have two storeys with basements, and each house is symmetrical with three bays. The central doorways are round-headed with voussoirs, flanking Doric columns, and fanlights. The windows are sashes, and to the rear of No. 12 is a single-bay brick cottage.	II
53, 55 and 57 Chapel Street; 53.65259°N 2.62929°W	—	Early 19th century	A row of three houses within a longer terrace, in brick with stone dressings and a slate roof. The houses have two storeys with basements, and each house is in two bays. All the houses have five stone steps flanked by iron railings that lead up to a doorway with a round-headed fanlight. All the windows have altered glazing, and in front of the basement areas are hooped iron railings.	II
2–8 Parker Street, 5 Park Street; 53.65701°N 2.63149°W	—	Early 19th century (probable)	A row of four sandstone houses in Parker Street with a slate roof, in two storeys and with former loomshops in the basements. Each house has a round-headed doorway with a semicircular fanlight. In the basements are loomshop windows, and in front of the basement areas are railings. No. 5 Park Street is in brick with stone dressings.	II
Stable block, Former Burgh Hall; 53.63310°N 2.63943°W	—	Early 19th century (probable)	The stable block to the hall (now demolished) is in brick with stone dressings and a slate roof. It has a rectangular plan with three bays and is in two storeys. The central bay projects slightly forward, and has a pedimented gable, and a round-headed arch with rusticated voussoirs, above which is a round-headed window, and a bull's eye window.	II
Chorcliffe House; 53.65516°N 2.63207°W	—	Early 19th century	A large town house, later converted into flats, in Georgian style. It is in brick on a stone plinth with stone dressings and a slate roof. The house has three storeys and a front of six bays. The third bay projects slightly forward and contains a doorway with Doric demi-columns, a triglyph-fluted frieze, and a fanlight. In the second bay is a Venetian window, and the other windows are sashes. At the rear is a full-height canted bay window.	II
Chorley Lodge, Duxbury Park; 53.63787°N 2.61722°W		Early 19th century	A lodge to the former Duxbury Hall, it is in stone with a slate roof, and is in Greek Revival style. The lodge has a T-shaped plan, and is in a single storey. On the front are two fluted Greek Doric columns, pilasters on the corners, a plain frieze and cornice, and a coat of arms in the tympanum of the pediment. All the openings have architraves.	II
Gate piers, Chorley Lodge, Duxbury Park; 53.63787°N 2.61709°W	—	Early 19th century	At the entrance to the drive to the former Duxbury Hall are six stone gate piers, a pair on each side of the gates, and a pair at the ends of the railings. They are square with moulded caps. Between them are tall iron gates, and railings with fleur-de-lis heads.	II
Wigan Lodge, Duxbury Park; 53.62804°N 2.61814°W		Early 19th century	A lodge to the former Duxbury Hall, it is in stone with a hipped slate roof and a central chimney. The lodge is in a single storey, and has a symmetrical front with a projecting central bay flanked by fluted pilasters. At the top is a moulded cornice and a plain parapet. The windows are sashes.	II
Gate piers, Wigan Lodge, Duxbury Park; 53.62785°N 2.61778°W		Early 19th century (probable)	At the entrance to the drive to the former Duxbury Hall are six stone gate piers, a pair on each side of the gates, and a pair at the ends of the railings. They are square fluted pillars with plain stepped capitals, and have unusual rounded finials. In the centre are gates mounted on iron posts, and the railings stretch for about 30 metres (98 ft) on each side.	II
Park House and Wesley House; 53.65728°N 2.63195°W	—	Early 19th century	Originally the home of a Methodist minister, and later divided into flats, it is in sandstone with a slate roof. There are three storeys, an attic and a basement, and a four-bay front, with a staircase wing on the left. At the top is a moulded cornice and a plain parapet. On the front is a porch with Doric columns, and a triglyphed entablature. The windows are sashes. At the rear is a two-storey extension.	II
Post and railings, Park Road; 53.65475°N 2.63292°W	—	Early 19th century	At the south end is a cylindrical stone post about 2.5 metres (8 ft 2 in) high surmounted by a stylised acorn finial. The iron railings stretch to the north, they have knobbed heads, and are divided into groups of 17 by shaped posts also with acorn finials.	II
The Rough; 53.66674°N 2.60817°W	—	Early 19th century	A house in rendered stone with a hipped slate roof, in late Georgian style. It has two storeys and cellars, and a symmetrical three-bay front. In the centre is a round-headed doorway having a fluted architrave with moulded imposts, and a scrolled keystone. The windows are sashes.	II
Railings, St Laurence's Churchyard; 53.65465°N 2.63279°W	—	Early 19th century (probable)	The iron railings extend for about 50 metres (160 ft) along the west side of the churchyard of St Laurence's Church. They have fleur-de-lis heads, and are divided into groups of ten by shaped columns with urn finials.	II
The Swan with Two Necks; 53.65517°N 2.63289°W		Early 19th century (probable)	Originally a house, later a public house, in brick with stone dressings and a slate roof. It has three storeys, and a three-bay front, and a single bay extension to the left and a lean-to extension to the right. The windows are sashes.	II
Waterloo Lodge; 53.67272°N 2.63456°W	—	Early 19th century	A stone house with a hipped slate roof, in two storeys and a basement. Originally in three bays, an additional bay was later added to the left. The original three bays are symmetrical with a central recessed porch flanked by Tuscan columns, behind which is a rounded-headed doorway with a fanlight. The windows are sashes.	II
The George; 53.65372°N 2.63315°W		Early to mid 19th century (probable)	A public house in sandstone with a slate roof, in three storeys and two bays. The round-headed doorway has moulded jambs, imposts, and a keystone. The window are sashes, those in the ground floor having three lights, and keystones.	II
Railway bridge 53.64099°N 2.61353°W		c. 1840	The bridge was built to carry the Bolton and Preston Railway over the Leeds and Liverpool Canal. It is in gritstone and consists of a single skewed elliptical arch with buttressed abutments and a parapet.	II
Railway viaduct 53.64231°N 2.61484°W	—	c. 1840	The viaduct was built to carry the Bolton and Preston Railway over the valley of the Black Brook. It is in gritstone, and consists of eight round-headed arches with voussoirs, carried on rectangular piers with moulded caps.	II
Ackhurst Lodge; 53.65606°N 2.65291°W		1842	The lodge at the entrance to the drive to Astley Hall is partly timber-framed with wattle and daub infill, and partly in rendered brick with applied timber. The roof is in stone-slate, there are tall brick chimney stacks, and the lodge has two storeys. It has a roughly rectangular plan, with a three-bay front, and there is a parallel range at the rear. In the centre of the front is a two-storey gabled porch with a Tudor arched entrance.	II
Chimney, Victoria Mill; 53.64827°N 2.62637°W		c. 1840	The chimney to a former cotton mill has been incorporated into a supermarket. It is in brick with stone dressings and external steel tie rods, it has a square section, and it tapers as it rises. There are panels on the sides, a stone band at the top, and a moulded stone cornice.	II
Flying arches 53.66848°N 2.63560°W	—	1842	A series of 16 flying arches (or strainer arches) supporting the sides of a cutting on the Bolton and Preston Railway. They are in gritstone, and span a distance of 26 feet 9 inches (8.15 m), each arch being 18 inches (460 mm) wide.	II
Cross Swords Farmhouse; 53.63956°N 2.64472°W	—	1845	The farmhouse is in stone with a stone-slate roof. It has two storeys, and two bays. All the windows contain altered glazing. In the centre of the upper storey is a large shield containing crossed swords. The date is inscribed on the left wall.	II
St Peter's Church; 53.66067°N 2.62343°W		1849–50	The church was designed by Charles Reed in Early English style, and transepts were added later. It is in sandstone with a gritstone plinth and dressings, and has a slate roof with red ridge tiles. The church consists of a nave with a clerestory, aisles, transepts, and a chancel. At the northwest corner is a polygonal four-stage stair turret that rises to become an octagonal belfry with a short spire.	II
War Memorial Archway; 53.65525°N 2.63368°W		Mid 19th century (probable)	The archway was originally at Gillibrand Hall, and moved to its present position and converted into a war memorial in about 1920. The archway is in sandstone, and consists of a large semicircular arch with rusticated voussoirs and a pendent keystone. It has an entablature with a moulded cornice, a frieze, a parapet, and piers with tapered pilasters.	II
9–27 St George's Street; 53.65221°N 2.63052°W	—	After 1850	A row of eleven houses, most of which were later used for other purposes, in brick with stone dressings and slate roofs. The houses have two storeys, with extensions at the rear. Most of them have Doric doorcases with pilasters and an entablature containing a moulded cornice and a frieze with garlands. Most of the windows have altered glazing.	II
16–28 St George's Street and the Old Coach House; 53.65199°N 2.63080°W		After 1850	A row of seven houses and a coach house, most of which were later used for other purposes. They are in brick with stone dressings and slate roofs. The houses have two storeys, with extensions at the rear. Each house has a stone moulded doorcase with a cornice carried on scrolled brackets, and most of the windows are sashes. On the side of the former coach house are two wagon doors converted into windows.	II
St Mary's Church; 53.65246°N 2.63329°W		1853–54	A Roman Catholic church designed by Joseph Hansom, rebuilt in the 1870s, and remodelled and enlarged in 1894, 1897 and 1927 by Pugin and Pugin. It is in sandstone with slate roofs, and consists of a nave that is embraced by aisles and a west porch, transepts, a sanctuary with a three-sided apse, and a northeast tower. The tower is in four stages, and has buttresses, a stair turret that is polygonal in its upper part and surmounted by a pinnacle, an ornate niche on the east side, and a traceried parapet with more pinnacles.	II
Drinking fountain 53.65946°N 2.64675°W		Late 19th century (probable)	The drinking fountain is in the grounds of Astley Hall. It is in cast iron and consists of a decorated bowl carrying a smaller bowl on a stem. Around this is a domed canopy carried on four fluted columns. The decoration on the canopy includes a leaf, a heron, and stylised leopards' heads.	II
Sacred Heart Church; 53.64957°N 2.62107°W		1894	A Roman Catholic church by Edmund Kirby, in Geometrical style. It is built red and yellow sandstone with a slate roof, and consists of a nave with a clerestory, aisles, transepts, and a polygonal apse. At the west end is a large round arch containing a rose window and a gabled porch.	II
Gateway, St Mary's Church; 53.65261°N 2.63253°W		1910–12	The arched gateway at the entrance to the churchyard is by Pugin and Pugin, based on a design by A. W. N. Pugin. It is in sandstone, and consists of a four-centred arch with carved spandrels. Above the arch is a niche containing a statue of Our Lady of Dolours, which is flanked by blind traceried panels. By the sides of the arch are niches with statues of female figures carrying the sacraments. On the reverse, the central niche contains a statue of a bishop.	II
