= Duxbury Hall =

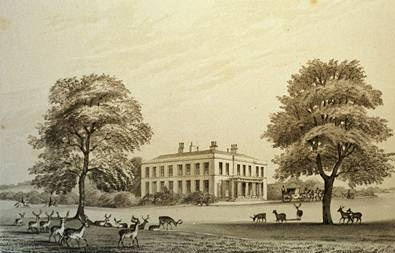
- Duxbury Hall as it looked in 1840

- Location within the Borough of Chorley

General information
- Status: Demolished
- Type: Country house
- Location: Duxbury Woods, Lancashire, England
- Coordinates: 53.63061°N 2.62349°W
- Opened: 1823
- Demolished: 1956

Technical details
- Floor count: 2

Duxbury Hall was a 19th-century country house in Duxbury Park estate in Duxbury Woods, Duxbury, Lancashire that has been demolished.

The hall was a plain two-storey building faced in millstone grit ashlar standing in a well-wooded park 1½ miles (2.5 km) south of Chorley. The entrance on the east front was via a Doric portico. In the cellars was evidence of an earlier building, probably a brick-built house enclosing a courtyard on three sides. The later building followed the same plan, having north and south wings extending westward from the east front. The roof was made of green slate.

== History ==
The manor of Duxbury belonged to the Duxbury family before the 1300s but, after Henry Duxbury's involvement in the abortive Banastre Rebellion in 1315 and his subsequent imprisonment in Lancaster Castle, ownership of the Duxbury land transferred to the Standish family around 1335. A Peel Tower was said to have been constructed within the area, during or after the Great Raid of 1322 when Chorley was raided by Scotland.

The first Duxbury Hall was built in 1532 in the Elizabethan style and was home to the Standish family for many decades. It is believed to be the birthplace of Mayflower Pilgrim Myles Standish.

The family were Puritans and active in politics. Thomas Standish (1594-1642) was MP for Liverpool and Preston. His younger son Richard Standish (1621-1662), who inherited the estate after the death of his elder brother Alexander in 1648, was MP for Liverpool and Preston. His son Richard was created a baronet in 1677 and elected as a Whig for Wigan in 1690. His son Thomas was appointed High Sheriff of Lancashire for 1711 and died in 1746, after which the estates passed to his son, another Thomas (1703–1756).

After the death of Sir Frank Standish, Bt (MP for Preston in 1768) in 1812, the estate was claimed on behalf of Frank Hall Standish on the grounds that he was the great grandson of Margaret Standish, Sir Frank’s aunt and the house occupied by his, guardian, George Baker. Another claimant, Thomas Standish of Wigan, broke into the house with his supporters and was forcibly ejected by the local militia. It transpired that Thomas Standish's claim was false.

In 1823 the hall was substantially rebuilt as a rectangular two-storey building with five reception rooms and cantilevered staircase and the house faced in ashlar in 1828. On 2 March 1859 part of the hall was destroyed by fire but rebuilt in 1861 looking substantially the same from outside. At its peak in the late 1800s Duxbury Manor comprised over 6000 acres.

After Frank Hall's death in Cádiz in 1840 the estate passed to his second cousin, William Standish Carr, who changed his surname to Carr-Standish. He served as High Sheriff of Lancashire in 1846 and died in 1856. He left the hall to his son William who died in 1878 and it then passed to William's three sisters, who sold it to the Mayhew family in 1891.

In 1932 the property was sold by Constance Mayhew to Chorley Corporation, who demolished it by 1956 because of a defective internal storm water drainage system and general neglect. The coach house and stables survived and are used as business premises. The gardens became Duxbury municipal golf course.

== See also ==
- Listed buildings in Chorley
- Standish family
