= Astley Hall, Chorley =

Country house in Lancashire, England

Astley Hall
- Astley Hall Museum and Art Gallery
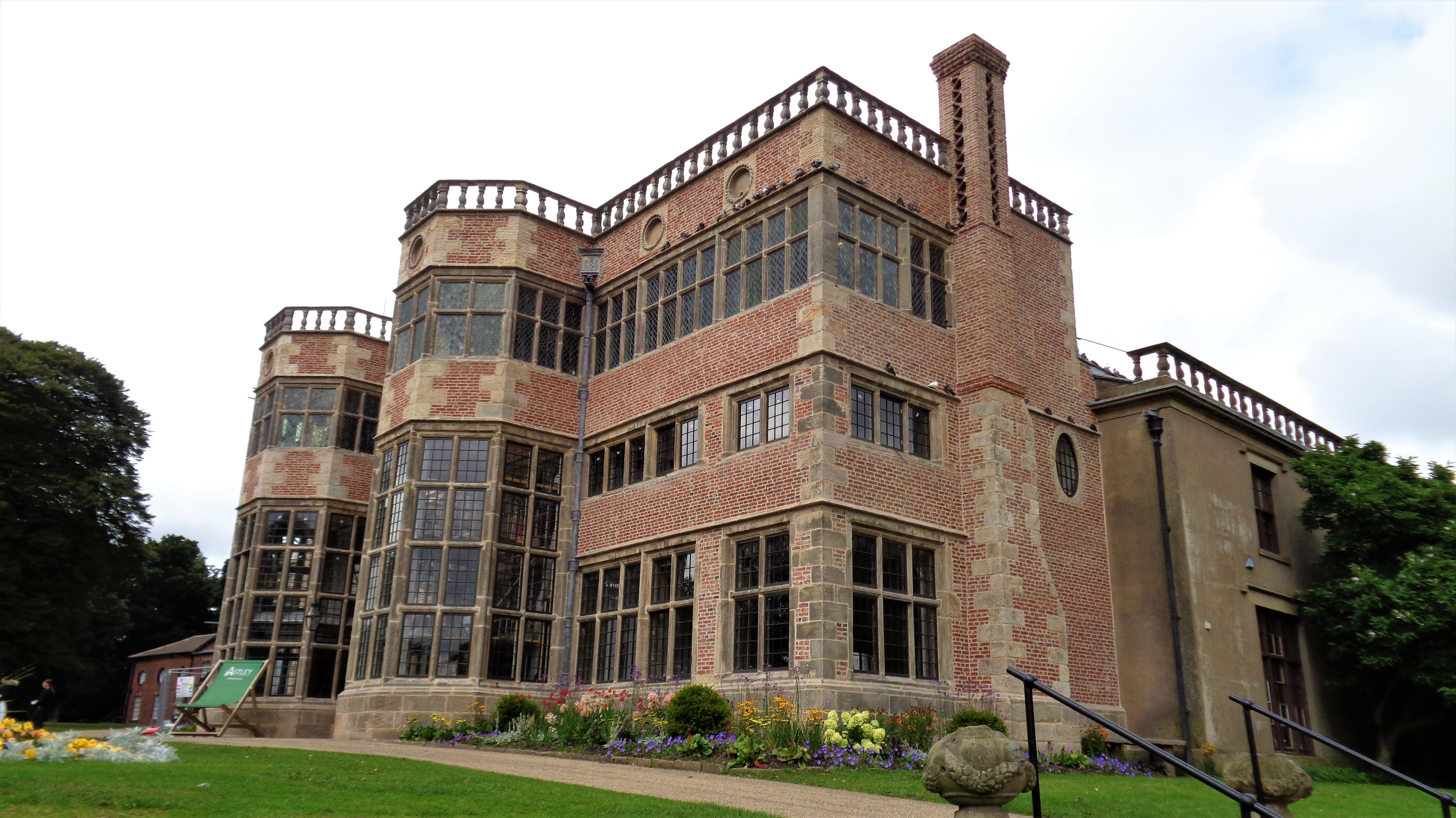
- Astley Hall in 2022, after restoration

- Location within Lancashire
- 53°39′34″N 2°38′43″W
- Type: Manor house
- Location: Chorley, Lancashire, England

History
- Built: c. 1570 onwards

Site notes
- Architectural styles: Elizabethan and Jacobean
- Owner: Chorley Borough Council
- Website: Official website

Listed Building – Grade I
- Official name: 21 December 1966
- Designated: Astley Hall
- Reference no.: 1362068

National Register of Historic Parks and Gardens
- Official name: Astley Hall
- Designated: 1 April 1986
- Reference no.: 1000943

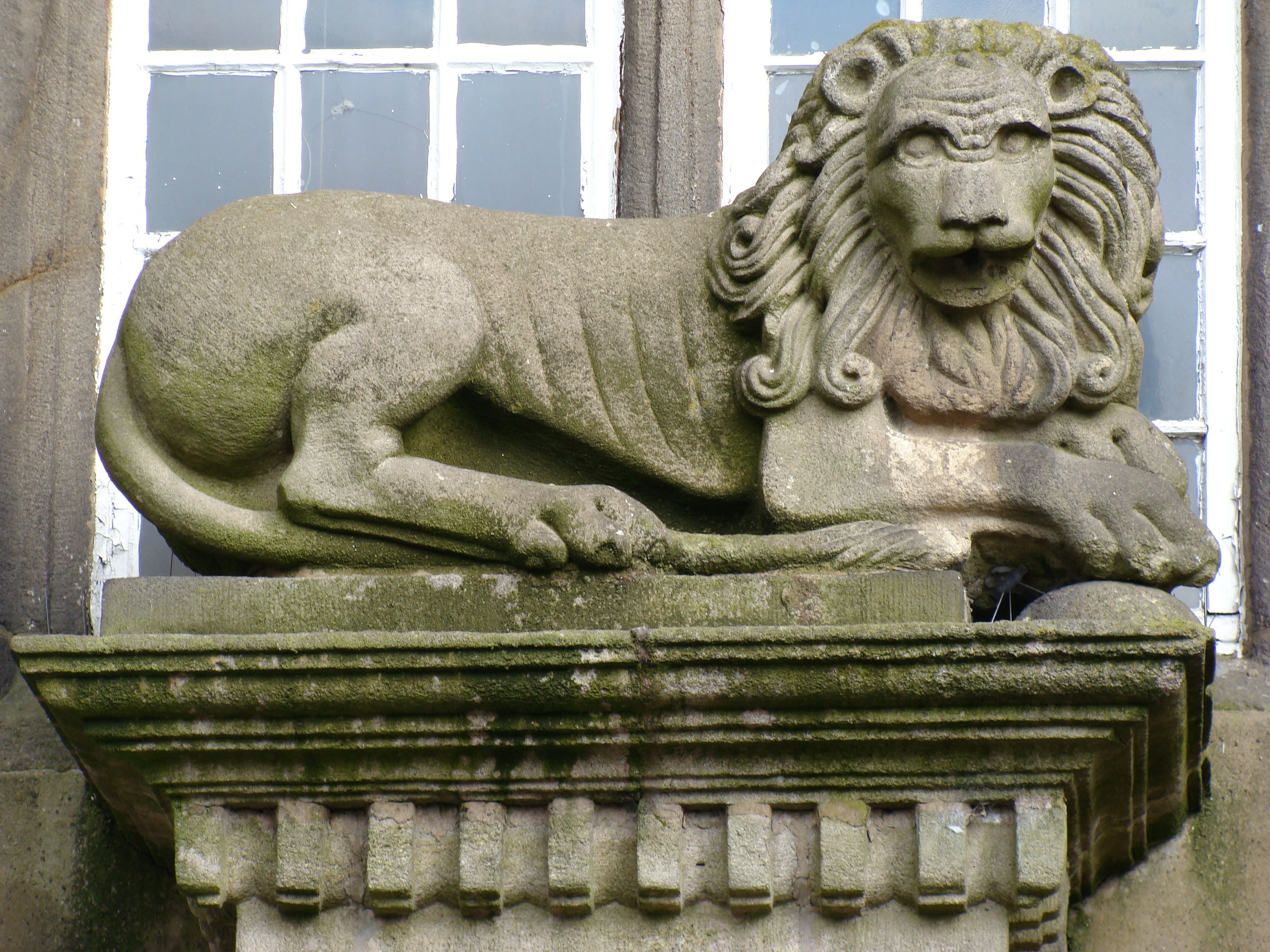
One of a pair of stone lions flanking the entrance.

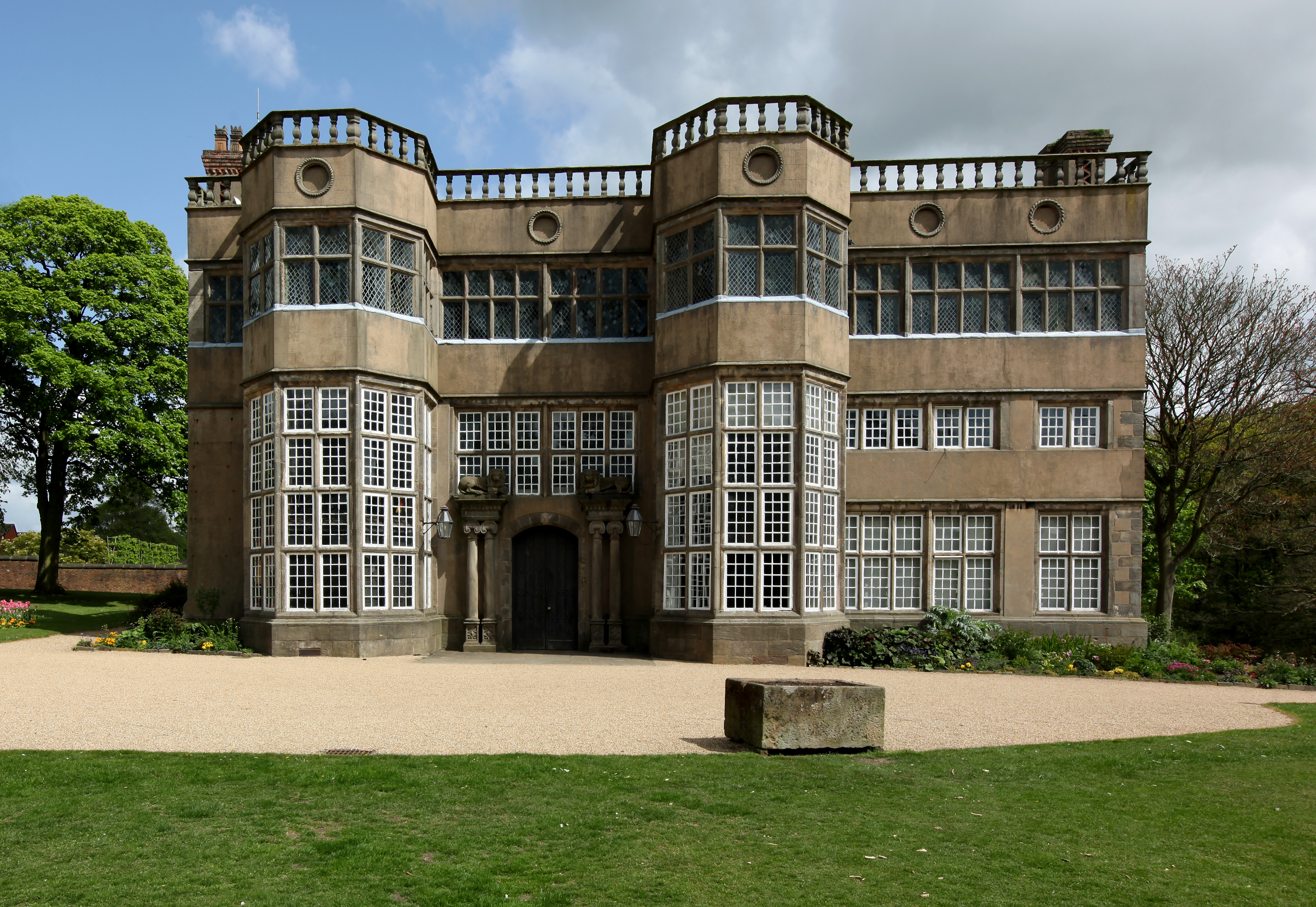
The 17th-century stone entrance facade (before restoration to the original brickwork).

Astley Hall is a country house in Chorley, Lancashire, England. The building is now owned by the town and is known as Astley Hall Museum and Art Gallery. The extensive landscaped grounds are now Chorley's Astley Park.

== History ==
The site was acquired in the 15th century by the Charnock family from the Knights of St John of Jerusalem. The Charnocks built the original timber-framed house, around a small courtyard, about 1575–1600. In 1665, Margaret Charnock married Richard Brooke of Mere in Cheshire (son of Sir Peter Brooke), and they built the present grand but asymmetrical front range of brick with a pair of vast mullion-and-transomed bay windows. This front has a doorway with distinctly rustic Ionic columns, remarkable at such a late date.

The interior is notable for the mid-17th century plasterwork in the ceilings of the Great Hall and drawing room, which have heavy wreaths and disporting cherubs. Not all the moulding is of stucco: there are elements of lead and leather. The staircase is of the same period with a coarse but vigorously carved acanthus scroll balustrade and square newels with vases of flowers on top.

The lower parts of the hall are panelled with inset paintings of a selection of modern worthies, including Protestants such as Elizabeth I and William the Silent; Catholics such as Philip II and Ambrogio Spinola; the explorers Christopher Columbus and Ferdinand Magellan, and Muslim rulers such as Bajazet and Mohammed II, Sultans of Turkey; it is thought this scheme might be rather earlier than the other work and date from the time of MP Thomas Charnock, who died in 1648. The entire width of the house on the top floor is occupied by a long gallery which contains a shovelboard table, 23.5 feet (7.2 m) long.

The house contains a bird's-eye view by an unknown artist showing the house c. 1710, which depicts small tower-gazebos at the angles of its forecourt. In due course, the Brookes failed in the male line and the house descended to Robert Townley Parker of Cuerden, who added the south wing in 1825 and stuccoed the exterior, probably to the design of Lewis Wyatt, who worked for Parker at Cuerden Hall. The dining room in the early 19th-century wing has inlaid 16th-century panelling brought in from elsewhere.

In 1864, the will of alkali manufacturer John Hutchinson of Widnes named one of his executors as "Thomas Part of Astley Hall in Chorley", although Thomas Part may well not have been the owner at the time.

In 1922, the house and its contents were given to Chorley Corporation by Reginald Tatton, as a memorial to the local men killed in World War I. It has since been maintained as a museum. The house contains fine oak furniture, Flemish tapestries and wooden panelling. It is rumoured that Oliver Cromwell stayed at the hall during the Battle of Preston in the 17th century, and reportedly left his boots behind. However, recent research shows that these may not be his own boots, although this does not rule out him visiting the hall. A wide range of temporary exhibitions are displayed in the art gallery throughout the season and events are organised throughout the year.

The plain classical brick stable block with pedimented centre is of c. 1800.

The grounds with a small lake were landscaped by John Webb and feature a picturesque meandering stream running through a wooded ravine.

The park, Coach House and walled garden have recently been renovated with help from the Heritage Lottery Fund and Chorley Council completed in 2022. An extensive project has seen the restoration of the 17th-century ha-ha, de-silting of the lake, felling of trees, moving the pets' corner and extensive renovation of the coach house and walled garden. The Coach House now houses a new art gallery and conference room on the first floor, with a café and gift shop on the ground floor.

In 2021, Speaker Lindsay Hoyle chose the hall for the G7 Speakers' Meeting.

== Previous owners ==
- Robert Charnock (d. 1616);
- Richard Charnock MP (d.1648–1653), 1616–48/53;
- Margaret Charnock, wife of Richard Brooke (1640–1715), 1648/53–1715;
- Peter Brooke, son (1673–1721), 1715–21;
- Thomas Brooke, brother (1684–1734), 1721–34;
- Richard Brooke, son (1717–48), 1734–48;
- Peter Brooke, brother (d.1786), 1748–86;
- Peter Brooke, son (1764–87), 1786–87;
- Susannah Brooke, sister (1762–1852), wife of Thomas Townley Parker (1760–94), 1787–?;
- Robert Townley Parker, son (1793–1879), ?–1879;
- Thomas Townley Parker, son (1822–1906), 1879–1906;
- Reginald Arthur Tatton, nephew (1857–1926), 1906–22;
- Borough of Chorley, 1922–present.

== Present ==
The hall is owned and managed by Chorley Council. It is used as a museum but can also be rented for functions and is open to the public at weekends. There is a £2.50 charge for adult residents of Chorley, and a £1.50 charge for local children, with prices higher for visitors out of the town.

In September 2021, the hall was the venue for the G7 Conference. Attendees included: Nancy Pelosi, Speaker of the US House of Representatives; Richard Ferrand, the President of the French National Assembly; Roberto Fico, President of the Italian Chamber of Deputies; David Sassoli, President of the EU Parliament, and representatives from Germany, Canada and Japan. The theme of the Speakers' G7 was "Secure versus Open Parliaments?".

=== Restoration ===
In 2020, work began to restore Astley Hall to the building's original state by removing the render that used to cover the building. The estimated cost of the restoration was £1.1 million, which covered the cost of both removing the render facade and restoring the interior of the building. The building reopened on 21 May 2022 after restoration works were completed. The hall fully reopened in 2026 after the final phase of a six-year restoration programme, a £400,000 project on the West Wing, built in about the 1570s for the Charnock family. Previously closed rooms reopened to visitors, with the Stucco Bedroom and Cromwell Bedroom furnished to reflect life at the hall in 1852.

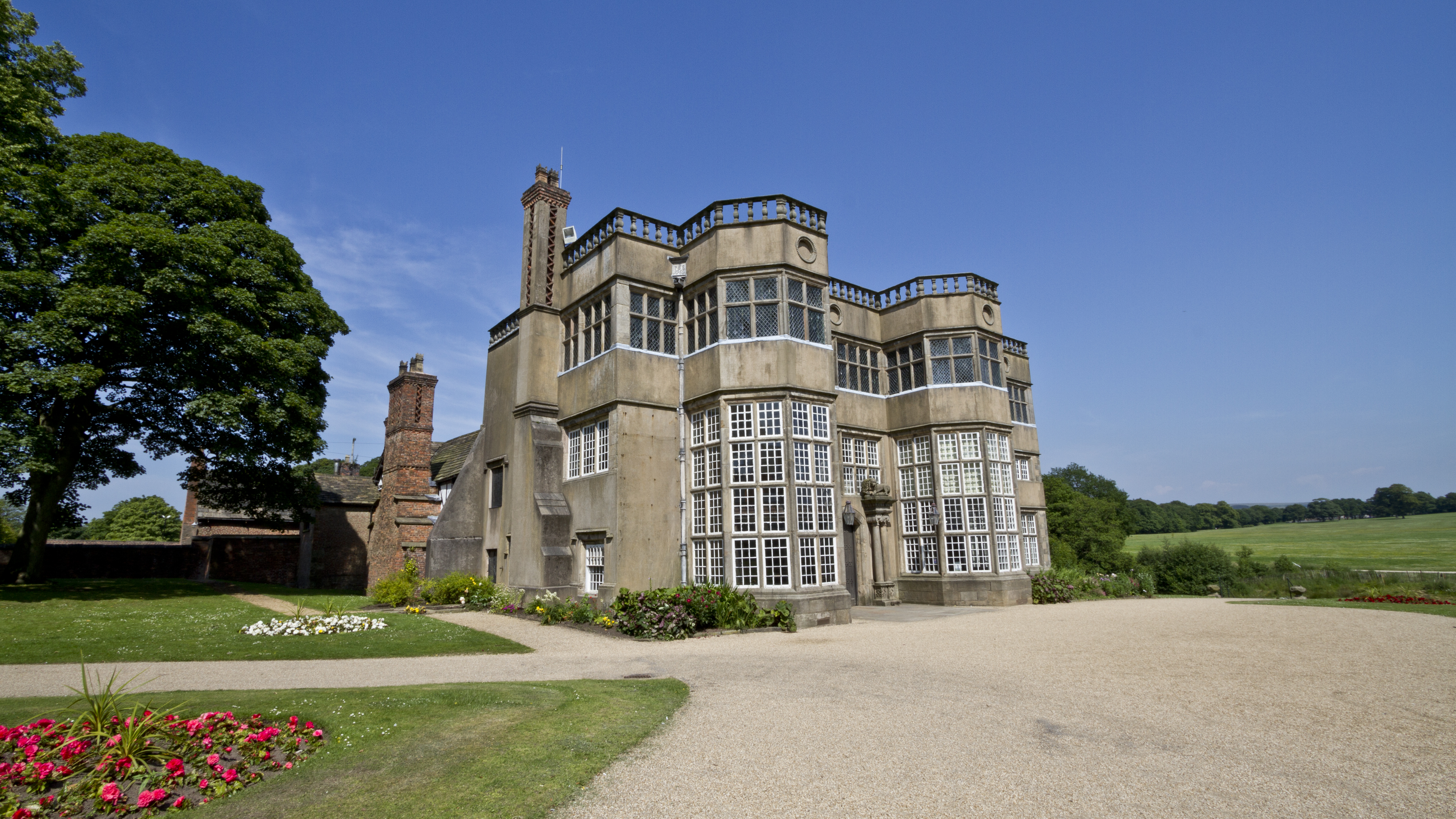
Astley Hall pre-restoration.

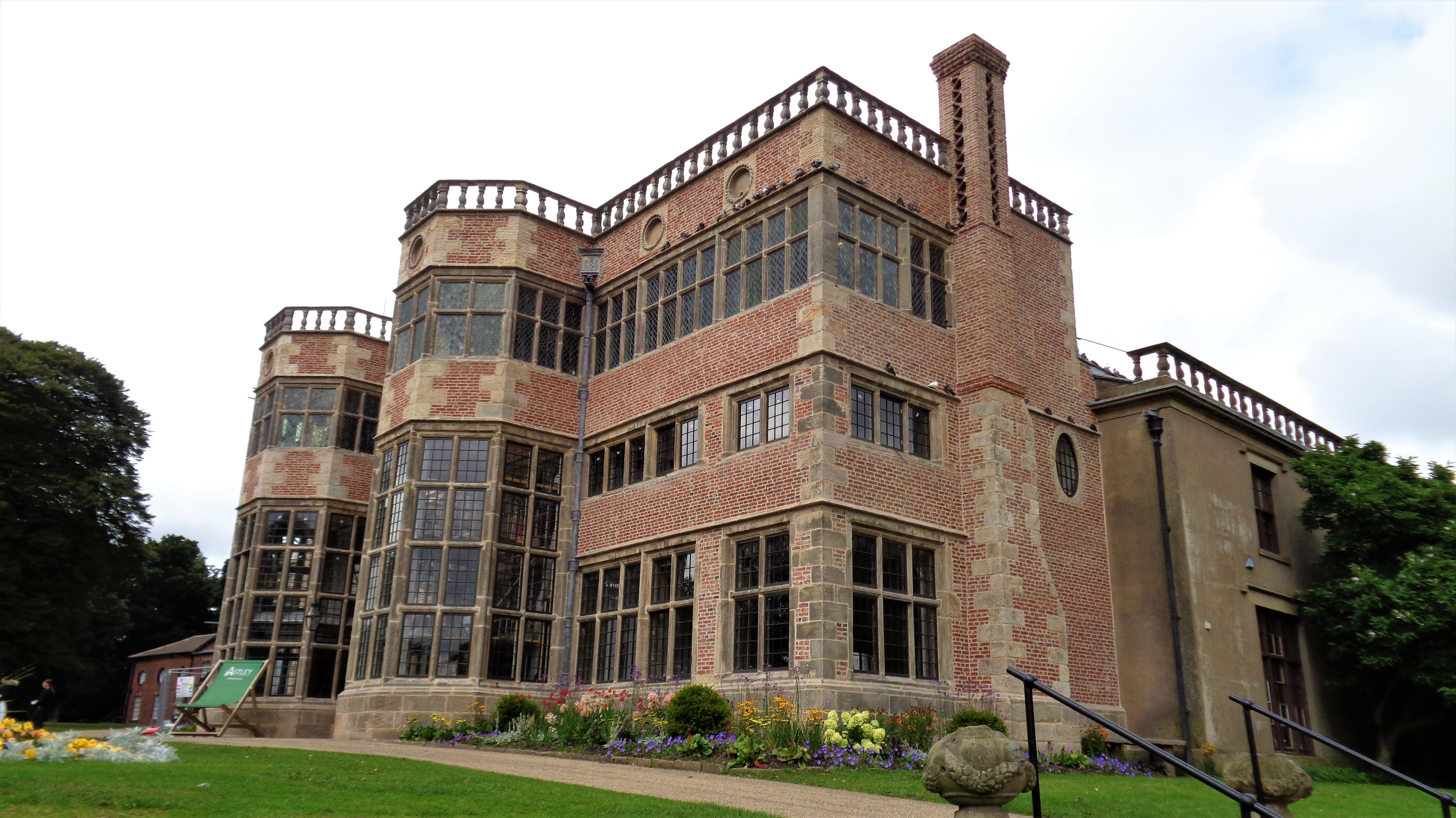
Astley Hall post-restoration.

== Gallery ==
The Stucco Room

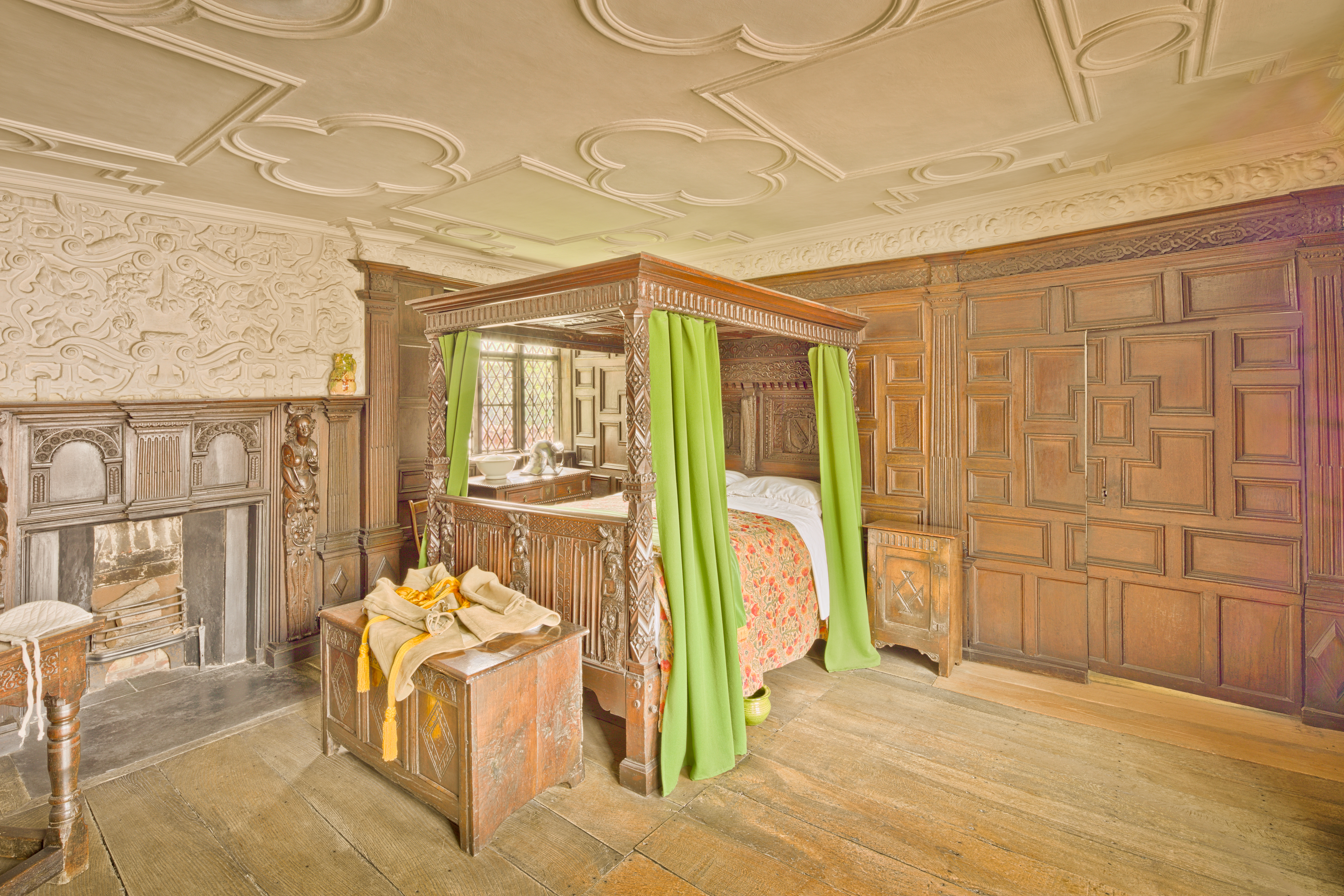
The Cromwell Room

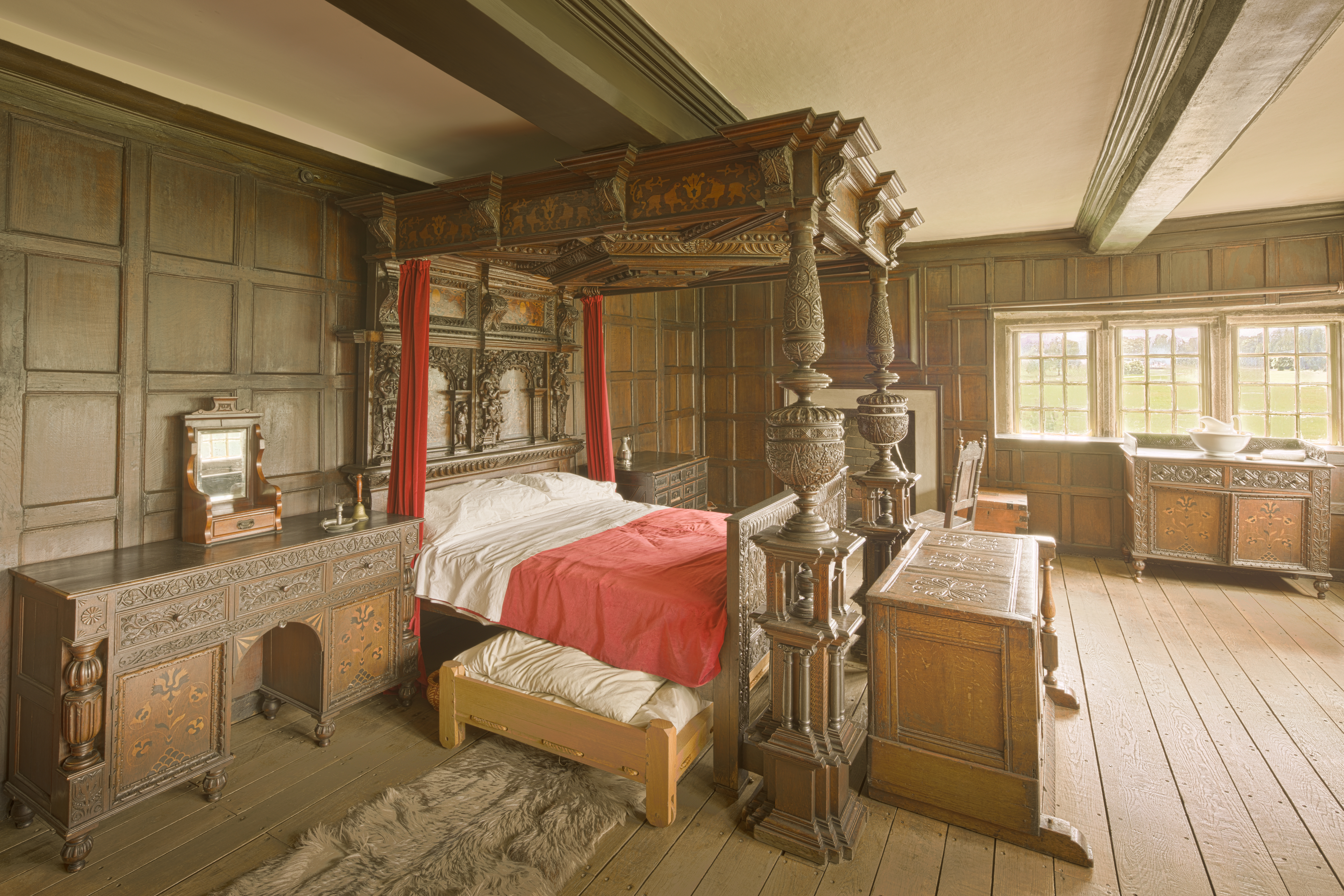
The Oak Bedroom

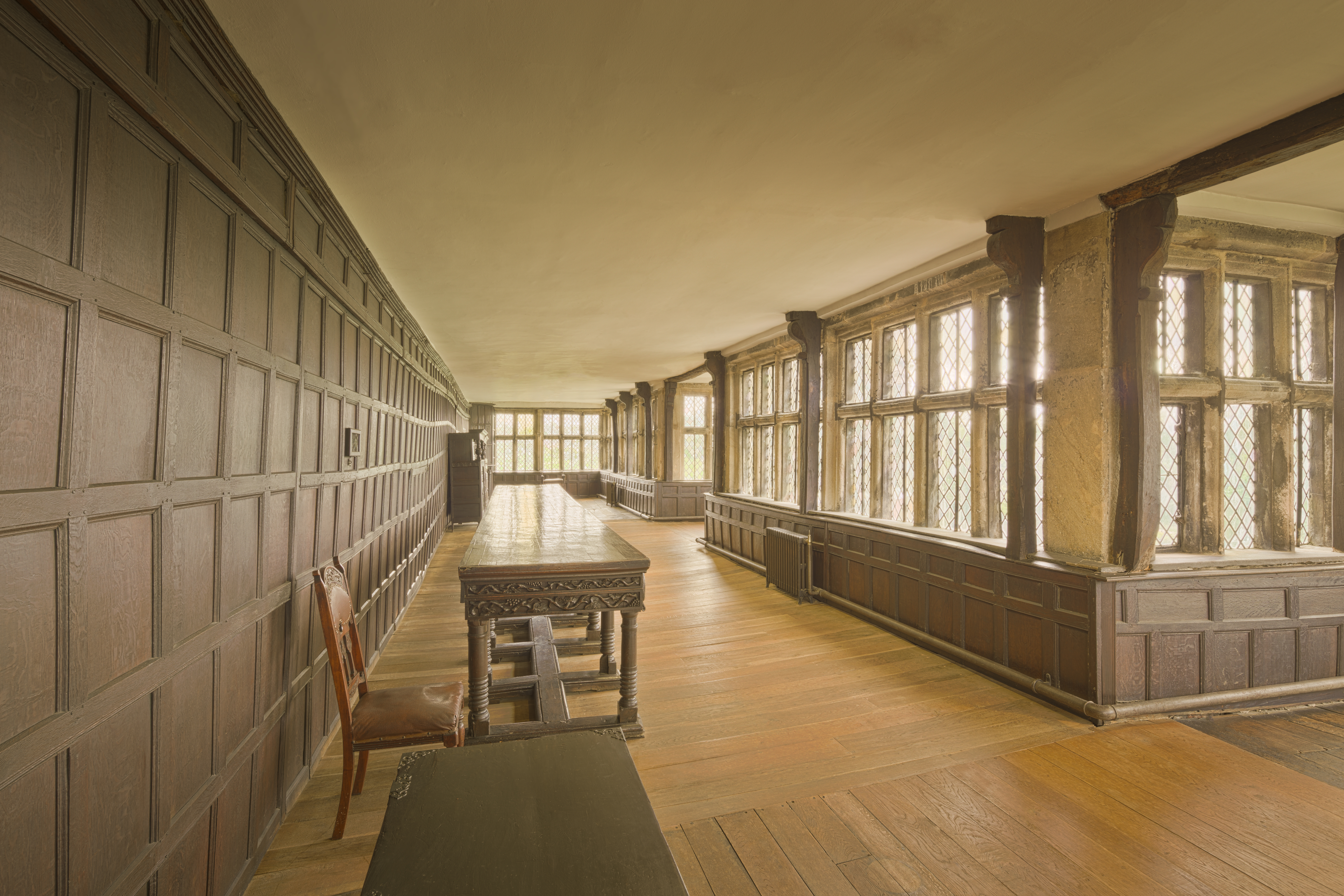
The Long Gallery

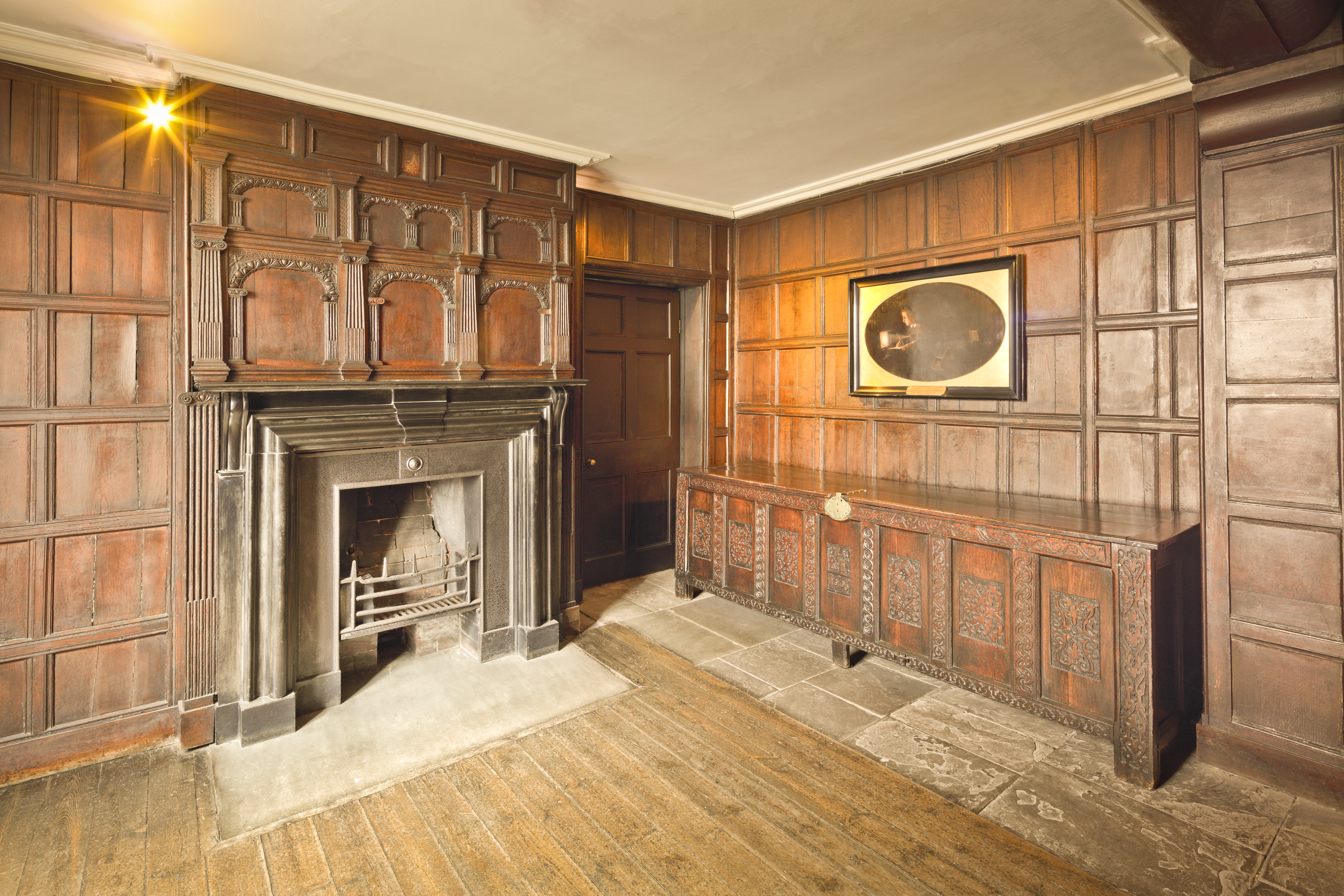
The Ante Room

The Inlaid Room

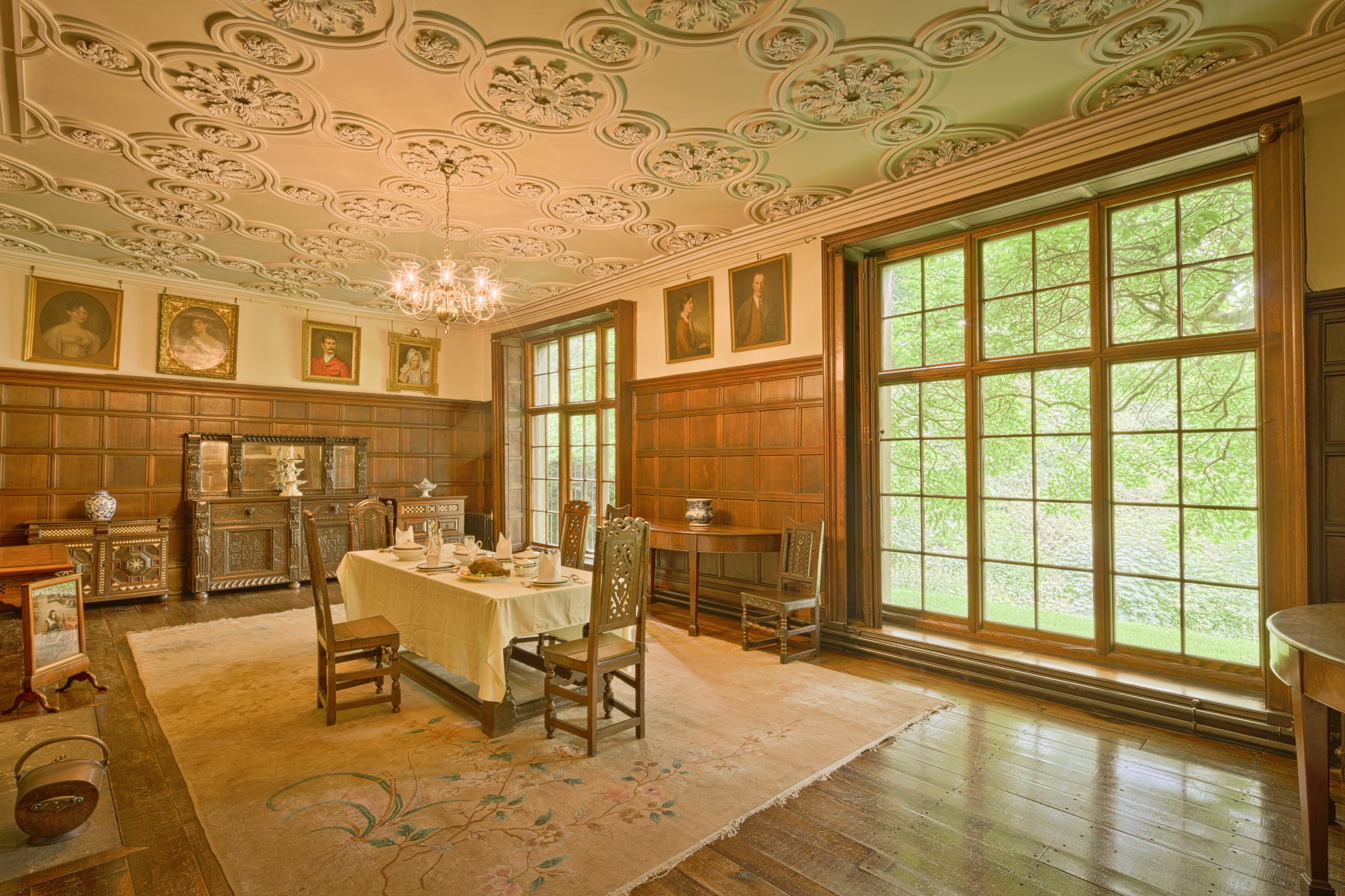
The Dining Room

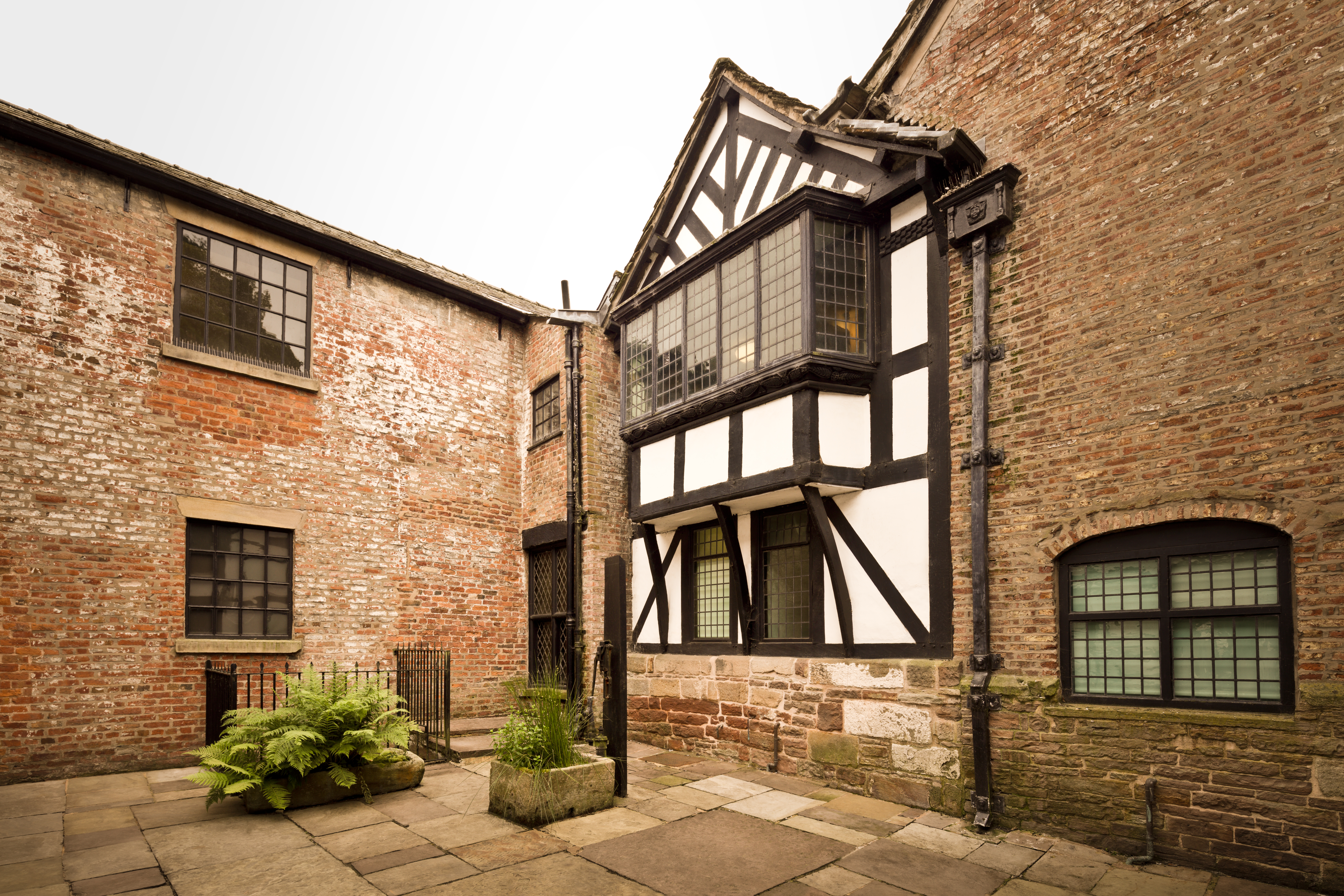
The Courtyard

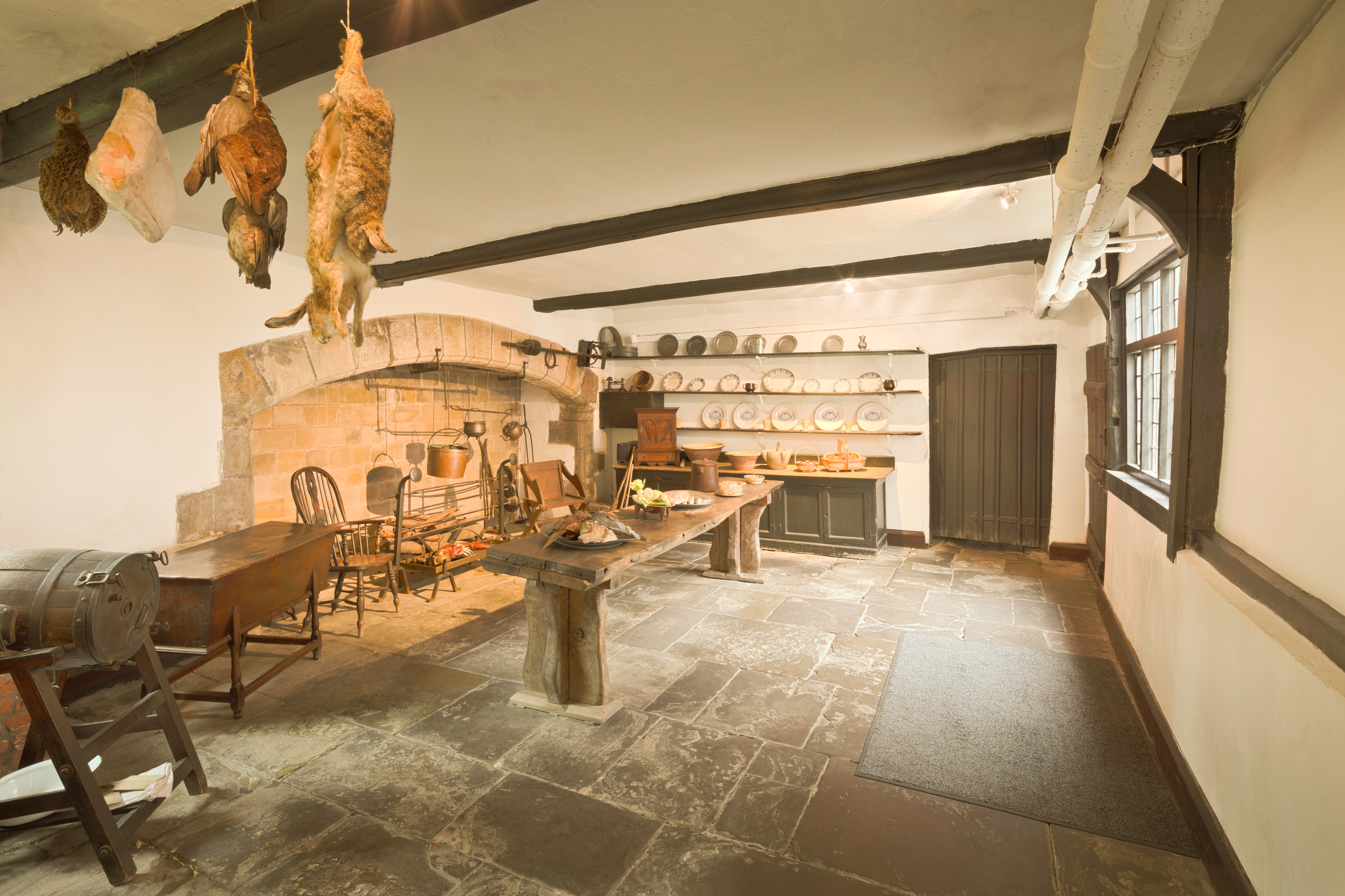
The Kitchen

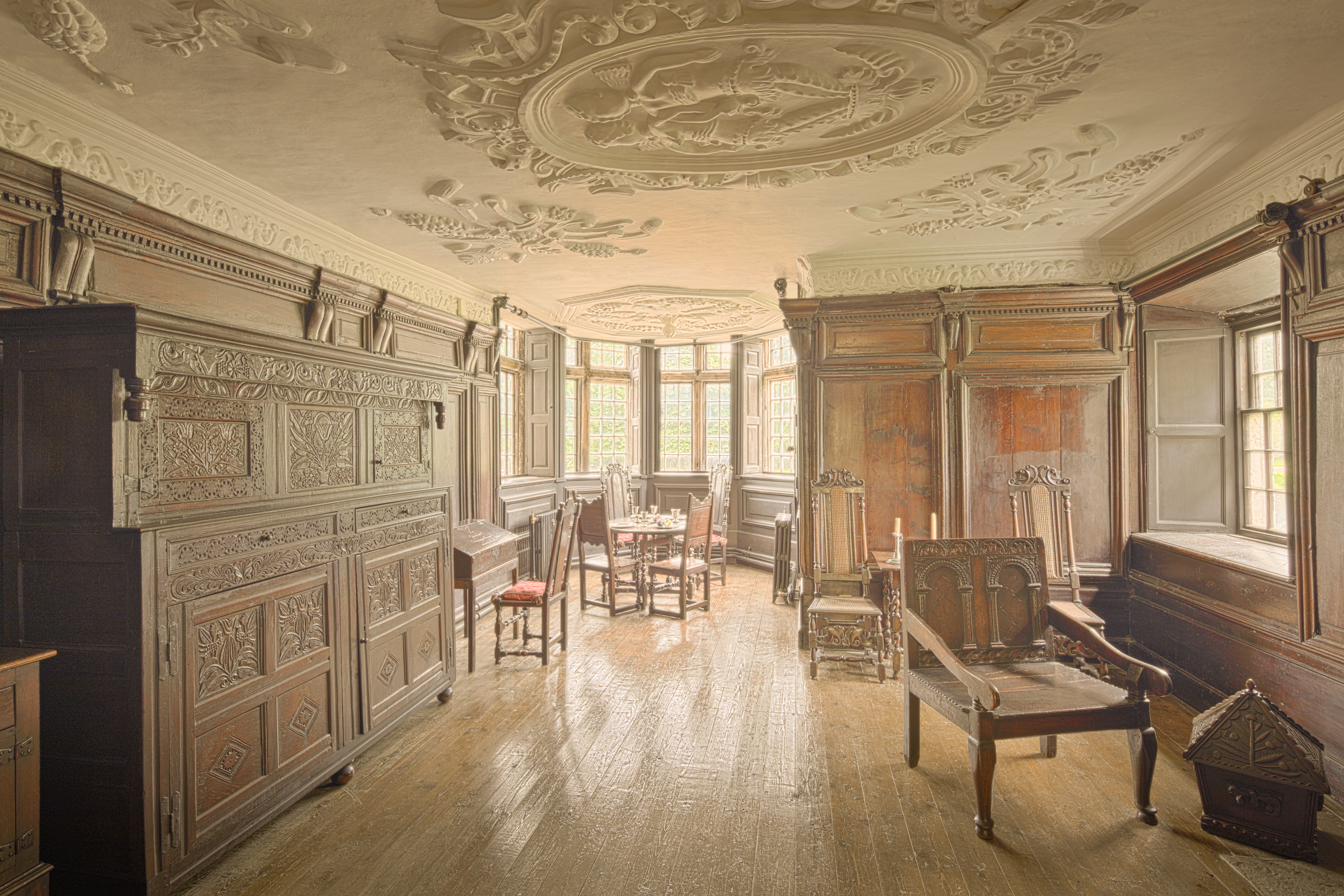
The Morning Room

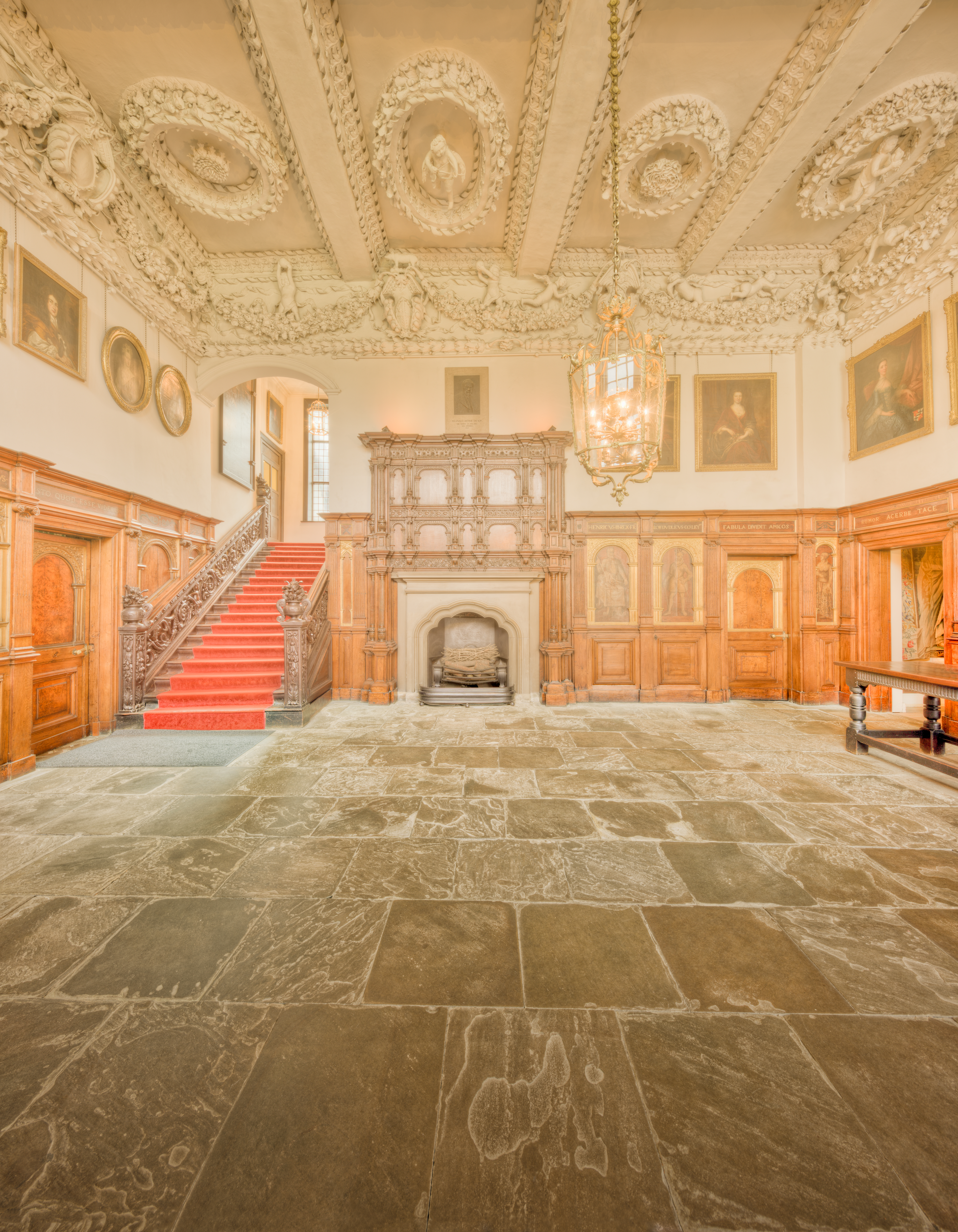
The Great Hall

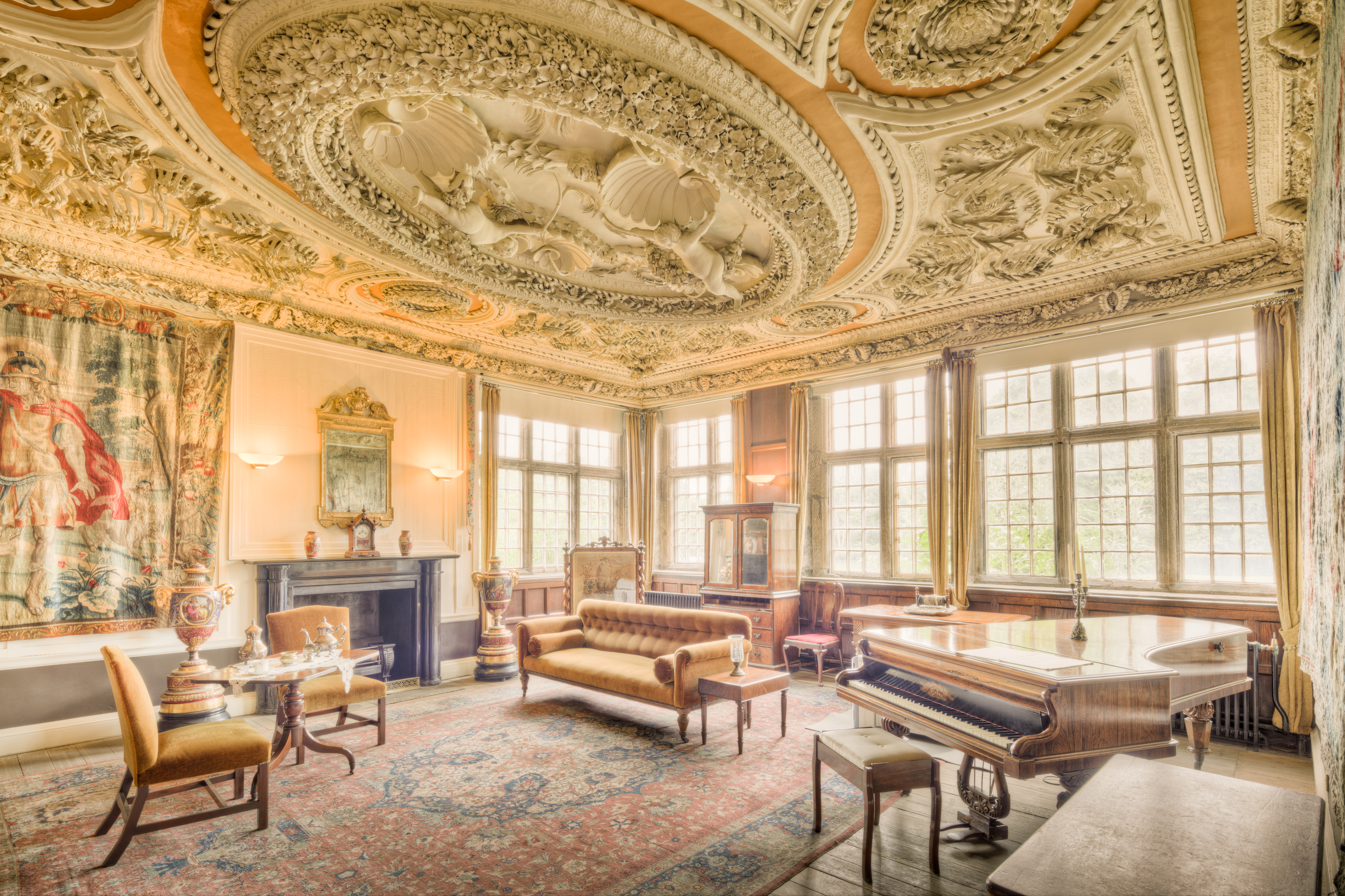
The Drawing Room

== See also ==
- Listed buildings in Chorley
