= Freemasons Hotel, Geraldton =

Coordinates: 28°46′22″S 114°36′37″E

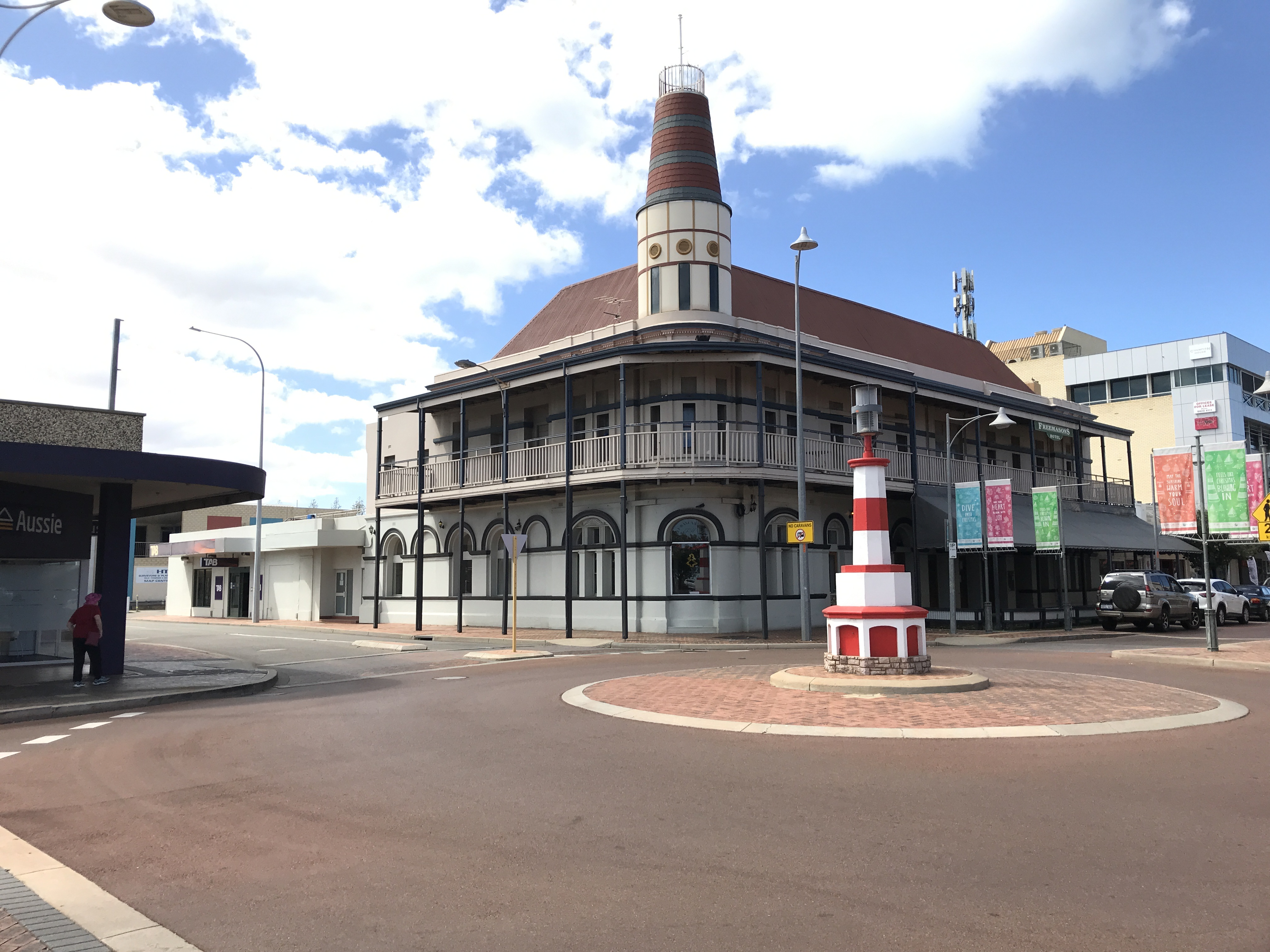
The Freemasons Hotel, Geraldton

The Freemasons Hotel is a historic hotel in Geraldton, Western Australia. It is located at 79 Marine Terrace in central Geraldton, at the corner of Durlacher Street.

The Freemasons Hotel was founded in the early 1870s, operating on a site adjacent to the modern location. By 1891 the licensee was Onslow Austin Trigg. A new Freemasons Hotel was designed by Henry Stirling Trigg, and built in 1895. The hotel was one of only a few substantial buildings in the area.

The building cost £6,000, and the furniture a further £2,000. There were 45 rooms in all. The ground-floor contained the front bar, a 21-by-17-foot (6.4 by 5.2 m) entrance from Marine Terrace, a 17-by-18 3/4-foot (5.2 by 5.7 m) saloon bar with three entrances, as well as four 13-by-12-foot (4.0 by 3.7 m) parlours, and a 17-by-15-foot (5.2 by 4.6 m) music room. An arcade provided access from the street to the bars, as well as a luxurious billiards room, measuring 33 by 22 feet (10.1 by 6.7 m), and featuring a low-cushion table imported from Melbourne. A 35-by-17-foot (10.7 by 5.2 m) dining room could seat 60 people, and was fitted with an expensive walnut sideboard and overmantel, and matching furniture. A separate corridor off the arcade provided access to the rooms used by boarders and lodgers. The ground floor also had a luggage room, and a reading and smoking room.

A large jarrah staircase, flanked by ornate columns supporting an arch, provided access to the upper level. There were 21 bedrooms upstairs, as well as a smoke-room, ladies' parlour, ladies' lavatory, bathrooms, and linen lockers, all arranged around six corridors. Three of the bedrooms were double rooms and the rest single rooms. The exterior of the building featured a balcony around three sides, and a tower rising from the corner of the building.

The hotel remains a landmark in Geraldton. The hotel was listed in the local Municipal Inventory on 23 June 1998. Restoration works c. 2001 replaced two verandahs over the footpaths and the corner tower, which had been removed. Further work in 2014 restored the doors between the front and lounge bars, and the building was repainted.

The hotel is also a live music venue; artists such as Jon English, The Angels, Angry Anderson, Daryl Braithwaite and the Bondi Cigars have performed there.
