= Henry Trigg (public servant) =

English-born public servant in colonial Western Australia (1791–1882)

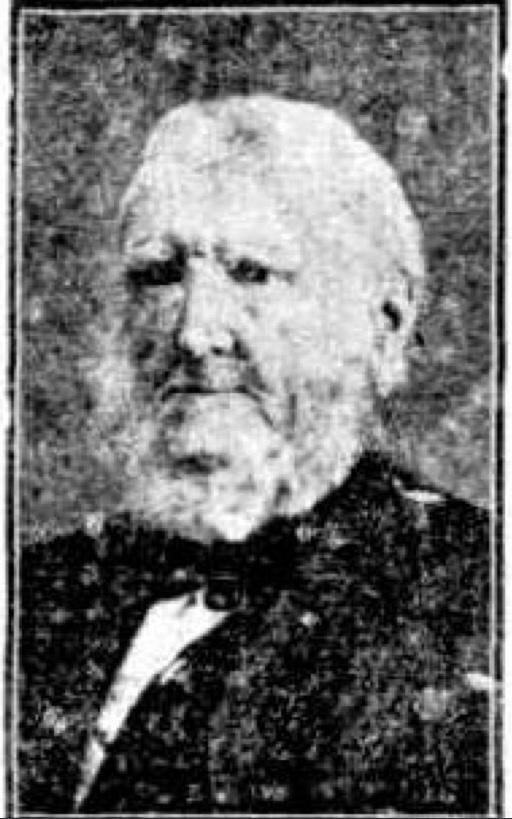
- Trigg in c. 1860
- Born: Henry Trigg; 30 June 1791; Gloucester, England
- Died: 15 February 1882 (aged 90); Perth, Western Australia
- Resting place: East Perth Cemetery
- Occupations: Carpenter, builder, public Servant, lay preacher, head Constable
- Partner: Amelia (née Ralph)
- Children: Eliza, Harriet, Emma, Jane, Amelia, Henry, William, Stephen, Susannah
- Parent(s): Henry, Mary

Henry Trigg (1791–1882) was the Superintendent of Public Works in Western Australia from 1839 to 1851 and founder of the Congregational Church in Perth.

== Biography ==
Henry Trigg was born on 30 June 1791 in Gloucester, England, the son of Henry and Mary Trigg. In 1813 he married Amelia Ralph (b. 1791) and they had seven children, Eliza, Harriet, Emma, Jane, Amelia, Henry and William, prior to him leaving England.

Trigg was a carpenter and a businessman but due to the economic depression in England following the Battle of Waterloo he felt that his family would have a better chance in the colonies and decided to emigrate to the Swan River Colony, leaving his family until he was set up and could afford their passage.

At the age of 38, he emigrated to Western Australia, arriving on the Lotus in October 1829. His personal wealth (£200) allowed him to take up a land grant of 1,208 ha (2,990 acres) in the colony. Trigg's grant encompasses what is now the suburb of Churchlands.

In 1831, Amelia and their seven children emigrated, arriving in the colony in December that year. They had two more children, Stephen (b. 1832) and Susannah (b. 1833). An additional child, a son, was stillborn in 1837.

Appointed Head Constable for Perth in December 1829, he then also became one of the first two constables appointed to the newly established Mounted Police Force in 1834 under the command of Captain T T Ellis which operated independently of the town constables. Then in 1838 he was appointed Clerk of Public Works, following which in December 1839 he was made Superintendent of Public Works, following the retirement of Henry Willey Reveley, a position in which he remained until his resignation in April 1851 to become a full-time Minister. In his role he supervised the construction of a number of jetties, bridges (including the Perth Causeway and Canning Bridge) a number of buildings on Rottnest Island (including the Rottnest Island Light Station), a number of gaols and lock ups in the newly developing towns of Guildford and Bunbury and the building of St George's Anglican church (the precursor to St George's Cathedral).

Trigg initially attended the first Anglican Church, where he was a choirmaster. He later joined the Wesleyans, but from 1843 he held prayer meetings in the Congregational tradition in his own home. In 1846, a chapel was constructed in William Street, where for six years, Trigg conducted all the services until, 1852, when the London Missionary Society sent out the Reverend James Leonard to be the first ordained Congregational minister. Trigg’s firm conviction to Christianity stems from an incident in 1831, a story he related from the pulpit, he was recovering from a bout of rum drinking (which was quite common in Perth at the time) when an apparition appeared to him while he was on the precipitous roof of the unfinished commissariat building’s where the current Supreme Court now stands. There, the apparition commanded him to "Throw down the bottle and never pick it up again". From that moment on he was a changed man. To him most of all, the founding of Congregationalism in Western Australia is due.

His grandson was Henry Stirling Trigg (1860–1919) who was a leading architect in Western Australia.

His wife, Amelia, died on 7 April 1873 at the age of 82, whilst Trigg died at the age of 91 on 15 February 1882 in Perth and is buried in the Congregational section of the East Perth Cemetery.

Trigg Beach and the surrounding suburb of Trigg, north of Perth, was named after him.
