= William James Zimpel =

William James Zimpel (25 February 1859 – 3 December 1923) was a Hungarian-born Australian furniture manufacturer, furniture merchant and local government councillor who founded the Australian furniture company Zimpels.

== Early life and career ==
Zimpel was born on 25 February 1859 in Pesth, Hungary, to David Zimpel and his wife Anna. The family moved to Constantinople, Turkey when Zimpel was 5. Following the death of his parents, Zimpel emigrated to London with his brother Adolf and his sister Klara. Having been exposed to the furniture industry while in the Ottoman Empire, Zimpel found employment as an art furniture manufacturer under John Stringer.

In 1884, Zimpel moved to Perth where he was selected to work in John Grave's Federal Furniture Factory. On 2 February 1886, he married Frances Nellie Harland at St George's Anglican Cathedral in Perth. They had eight children. Zimpels later set up his own wholesale and retail furniture business which became the largest in Western Australia with some one hundred workers as its employees.

== Later years ==
Zimpel testified before a couple of legislative committees in 1893 and 1899 and became a local municipal councillor in Western Australia. He died on 3 December 1923 in Cottesloe and was buried in Karrakatta Cemetery. His son, Cecil Edward William, took over as Zimpels' managing director; in 1981, Parrys Esplanade Limited acquired Zimpels.
