= Roddlesworth =

Hamlet in Lancashire, England

Coordinates: 53.689°N 2.525°W

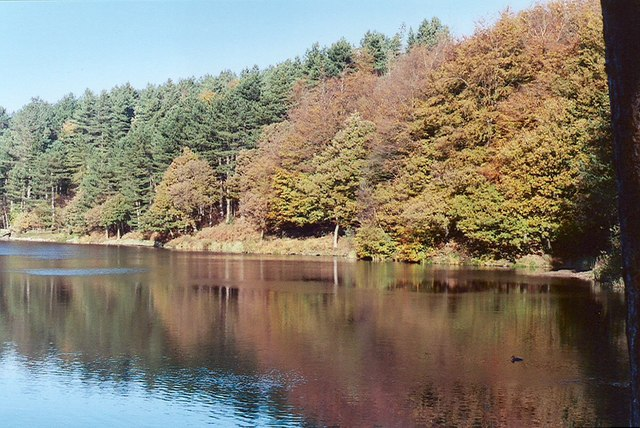
- Autumn view at Roddlesworth Reservoir

- Location within Lancashire
- OS grid reference: SD653215
- Civil parish: Withnell
- District: Chorley
- Shire county: Lancashire
- Region: North West
- Country: England
- Sovereign state: United Kingdom
- Post town: CHORLEY
- Postcode district: PR6
- Dialling code: 01254
- Police: Lancashire
- Fire: Lancashire
- Ambulance: North West
- UK Parliament: Chorley

Roddlesworth is a hamlet in the parish of Withnell in Lancashire, England. It lies on the road connecting Preston with Bolton.

The name is first encountered as Rodtholfeswrtha (1160), meaning "the homestead of Hrothwulf".

== See also ==
- River Roddlesworth, a tributary of the River Darwen
- The Roddlesworth Reservoirs, a chain of reservoirs on the river:
  - Abbey Village Reservoir
  - Lower Roddlesworth Reservoir
  - Upper Roddlesworth Reservoir
  - Rake Brook Reservoir, on Rake Brook, a tributary of the Roddlesworth, is often included.
