= Upper Roddlesworth Reservoir =

Reservoir in Lancashire, England

- Shown on the border of Chorley Borough Shown on the border of Blackburn with Darwen Shown in Lancashire Shown in England
- Location: Lancashire
- Coordinates: 53°41′35″N 2°31′5″W
- Type: Reservoir
- Primary inflows: River Roddlesworth
- Primary outflows: River Roddlesworth
- Basin countries: United Kingdom

Upper Roddlesworth Reservoir is a reservoir on the River Roddlesworth near Abbey Village in Lancashire, England.

The reservoir is close to Lower Roddlesworth Reservoir and Rake Brook Reservoir and sits within dense woodland.

== History ==
The construction of reservoirs on Rivington Pike was the first major attempt by Liverpool Corporation Waterworks to obtain water from outside of the city of Liverpool. The Liverpool Corporation Waterworks Act 1847 (10 & 11 Vict. c. cclxi) authorised the construction of reservoirs at Anglezarke, Upper Rivington and Lower Rivington on the western edge of the 10,000 acres (40 km^{2}) of moorland which comprises Rivington Pike. The reservoirs were used to hold water for the supply of drinking water, and were linked to two further reservoirs on the northern edge of the moors at Rake Brook and Lower Roddlesworth by an open channel, 3.75 miles (6 km) long, called The Goit. These were used to supply compensation water, to maintain the flows in the existing river system. The engineer for the project was Thomas Hawksley, and the scheme, which included a bank of filters at Rivington and a 17.3-mile (27.8 km) pipeline to carry the water to Liverpool, was completed in 1857.

Upper Roddlesworth Reservoir was constructed under a separate act of Parliament, the Liverpool Corporation Waterworks Act 1860 (23 & 24 Vict. c. xii). It is unclear who designed the reservoir or supervised its construction, although it was not Hawksley. The impounding earth dam was 1,190 feet (360 m) long, and at its highest point was 69 feet (21 m) above the original ground level. The work was completed in 1865, and increased the storage capacity of the Rivington chain by about six per cent. There have been a number of issues with the dam since its construction. In 1904, a swallow hole 8 feet (2.4 m) deep and 5 feet (1.5 m) across appeared in the dam, on the upstream side of the central clay core. The hole was filled with puddle clay, but another hole appeared at that point 21 months later. A vertical shaft was excavated, and a small spring was discovered at a depth of 33 feet (10 m). A search of the archives revealed that the engineer building the dam had encountered problems with springs, but had reported that they had been solved. The solution adopted in 1906 was to install a 12-inch (300 mm) cast iron pipe vertically upwards from the bottom of the shaft, with a 4-inch (100 mm) outlet feeding into the reservoir. The bottom 7 feet (2.1 m) of the shaft were then filled with stones and gravel, while the rest of it was packed with puddle clay, and no subsequent subsidence occurred at that site.

However, a similar problem occurred elsewhere on the dam in January 1908, when a hole approximately 4 feet (1.2 m) across appeared near to the puddle clay core. Excavation of the hole revealed running water at a depth of 26.5 feet (8.1 m), and this was dealt with in a similar fashion to the previous hole. Further problems occurred in January 1954, when the toe of the dam, which was formed of sand, was washed away as a result of heavy rainfall. Water running off from the higher ground at either side of the dam ran along a berm near the foot of the dam, causing the sand to flow away, and a landslip to occur. This was resolved by improving the drainage system on the downstream side of the dam, and by creating channels to divert run-off water away from the dam at its outer edges.

As a result of the passing of the Water Act 1973, responsibility for Liverpool's water supply and sewerage passed to a regional water authority, and thus Upper Roddlesworth Reservoir became one of the assets of the newly-formed North West Water Authority. The Conservative Party then saw privatisation as a way to deal with the huge funding gap facing the water industry, and responsibility for the reservoir passed to the water and sewerage company North West Water plc following the passing of the Water Act 1989. North West Water merged with Norweb in 1995 to become United Utilities, the present owners of the asset. The water now supplies customers in the Wigan area rather than in Liverpool. The reservoir holds around 163 million imperial gallons (740 Ml) when full.

== Bibliography ==
- Binnie, G M (1981). Early Victorian Water Engineers. Thomas Telford. ISBN 978-0-7277-0128-2.
- Ofwat (2006). "The Development of the Water Industry in England and Wales" (PDF). OFWAT. Archived from the original (PDF) on 4 June 2015.
- Porter, Elizabeth (1978). Water Management in England and Wales. Cambridge University Press. ISBN 978-0-521-21865-8.
