= Lower Roddlesworth Reservoir =

Reservoir in Lancashire, England

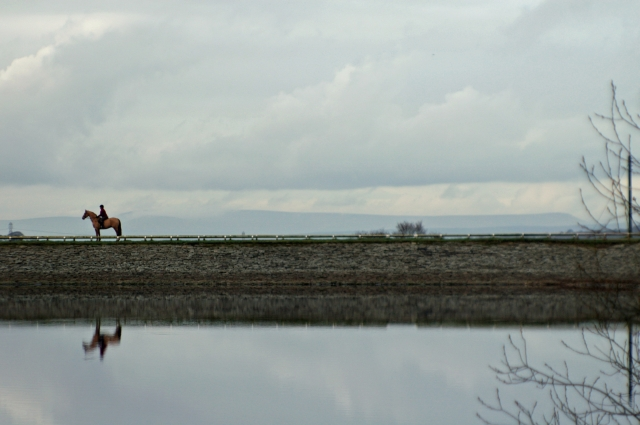
- The dam of the reservoir

- Shown within Chorley Borough
- Location: Lancashire
- Coordinates: 53°41′44″N 2°31′42″W
- Type: reservoir
- Primary inflows: River Roddlesworth
- Primary outflows: River Roddlesworth
- Basin countries: United Kingdom

Lower Roddlesworth Reservoir is a reservoir on the River Roddlesworth close to Abbey Village in Lancashire, England.

The reservoir is close to Upper Roddlesworth Reservoir and Rake Brook Reservoir, situated within thick forest. It was constructed in the 1850s by Thomas Hawksley for Liverpool Corporation Waterworks, and together with Rake Brook, was designed to hold compensation water to maintain flows in the rivers, whereas the reservoirs at Lower Rivington, Upper Rivington and Anglezarke held water for the public water supply. Water from the two compensation reservoirs was fed into Anglezarke reservoir by a 3.75-mile (6 km) channel called The Goit.

An act of Parliament to authorise its construction was obtained in 1847, and Hawksley designed an earth dam which was 82 feet (25 m) tall at its highest point and 590 feet (180 m) long. It impounded 91 million imperial gallons (414 Ml) of water when full. The reservoir was completed in 1857.

== Bibliography ==
- Binnie, G M (1981). Early Victorian Water Engineers. Thomas Telford. ISBN 978-0-7277-0128-2.
