= Rivington (disambiguation) =

Rivington is a village in Lancashire, England.

Rivington may also refer to:

- Rivington & Co., a former English publishing house
- The Rivingtons, an American doo-wop group
- Rivington Pike
- Rivington and Blackrod High School
- Rivington Water Treatment Works
- Upper Rivington Reservoir
- Lower Rivington Reservoir
- Rivington Arms, an art gallery in New York City
- Rivington Street, a street in Manhattan, New York City
- Rivington, an area in the video game Baldur's Gate 3

== People with the surname ==
- Rivington (surname)

== People with the given name ==
- Rivington Bisland, American Major League Baseball player
