= Withnell Fold =

Village in Lancashire, England

Coordinates: 53.702°N 2.589°W

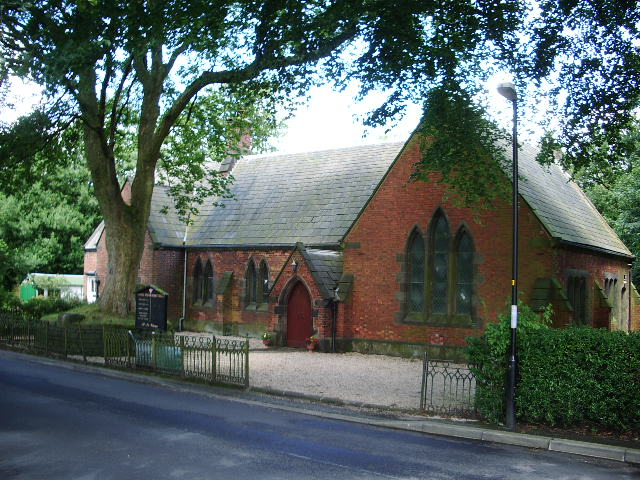
- Withnell Fold Methodist Church

- Shown within Chorley Borough Location within Lancashire
- OS grid reference: SD612231
- Civil parish: Withnell
- District: Chorley
- Shire county: Lancashire
- Region: North West
- Country: England
- Sovereign state: United Kingdom
- Post town: CHORLEY
- Postcode district: PR6
- Dialling code: 01254
- Police: Lancashire
- Fire: Lancashire
- Ambulance: North West
- UK Parliament: Chorley

Withnell Fold is a village, situated between Blackburn and Chorley, in Lancashire, England.

== History ==
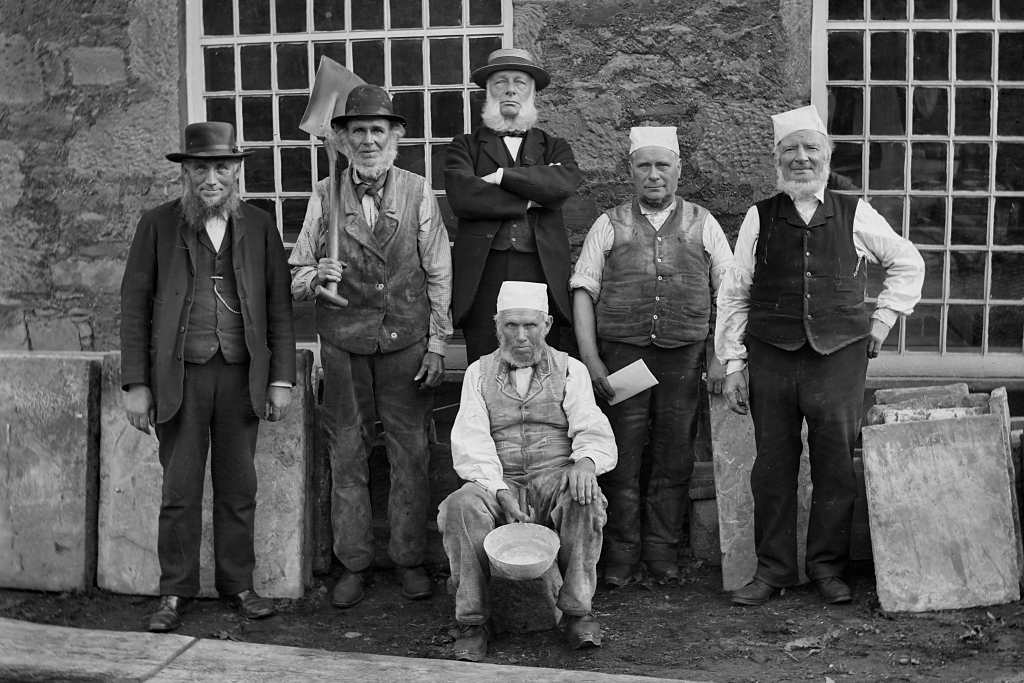
Withnell Fold mill workers c1875: Joseph Blackburn, Peter Brindle, Thomas Blinkhorn Parke, Richard Cranshaw (seated), John Eccles, John Hilston

Withnell Fold, a model village and paper mill was built on a greenfield site in 1843. The owner and builder was Thomas Blinkhorn Parke (1823–1885), the son of Robert Park, a local cotton mill owner. The houses in Withnell Fold had gardens and outside toilets.

The mill was started in 1843 and opened and began production on 15 January 1844, with one machine. Three years later a second machine was installed, and the business was so successful that a third machine was installed in 1855. The machines were known as "74", "66" and "60", the widths of the paper produced. The quality and variety of the paper improved, and in 1849, tissue paper was made, followed in 1856 by coloured tissue.

Writing papers were introduced in 1863 and had a reputation for being of the finest quality. Cartridge paper came in 1878. The mill supplied newsprint for Preston, Bolton and Liverpool newspapers. The firm continued as a family concern until 1890 when it combined with Wiggins Teape & Co., an old established firm of stationers.

Although the merger did not take place until 1890, the mill had supplied paper to Wiggins and Teape from 1847, and in an old diary kept by Mr. T. B. Parke, there is an entry for February of that year, which reads "Am now making double cap ordered by Wiggins & Teape".

Notable dates in the village chronology are:

- 5 March 1843: Commencement of building work for mill and village cottages.
- 15 Jan 1844: This was the day on which we commenced making paper.
- Withnell Fold Paper Mill closed in 1967, and the last batch of paper was made at 13:00 hrs on 23 December 1967.

== Education ==
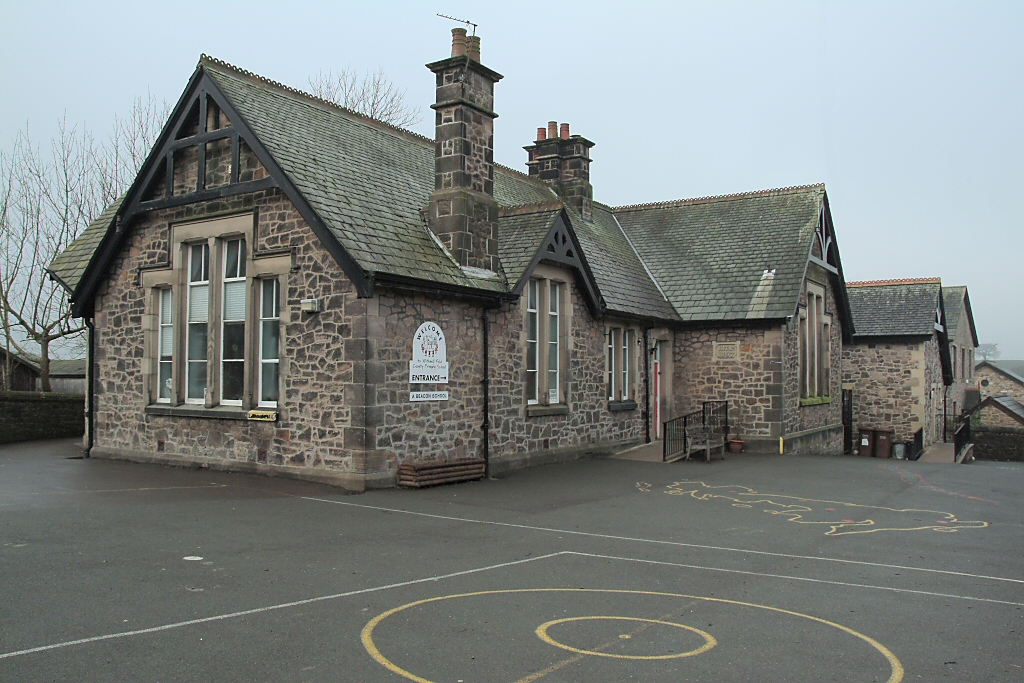
Withnell Fold County Primary School

Withnell Fold Methodist Church was built by Thomas Blinkhorn Parke in 1852 as a day school and chapel combined. It was opened on 13 June 1852, by Revd Joshua Priestly. Two days later, Miss Dutton of Coventry arrived to take up the post of schoolmistress.

By 1897, the school was too small so Herbert Thomas Parke, son of Thomas, built a new school by the village square. This is now Withnell Fold Primary School. By the entrance to the school is a sculpted tree which represents Thomas Blinkhorn Parke, the villages’ founder.

The date stone to the right of the school’s main entrance door shows HTP 1897, the initials of Herbert Thomas Parke and the date the building was completed. Lessons did not start until 2 May 1898, when the children moved from the old school. The headmistress was Esther Jenkins, who took up her duties on 7 February 1898. She continued to teach at the school until her retirement in 1935.

== See also ==
- Listed buildings in Withnell
