= River Roddlesworth =

River in Lancashire, England

Coordinates: 53.7230°N 2.5459°W

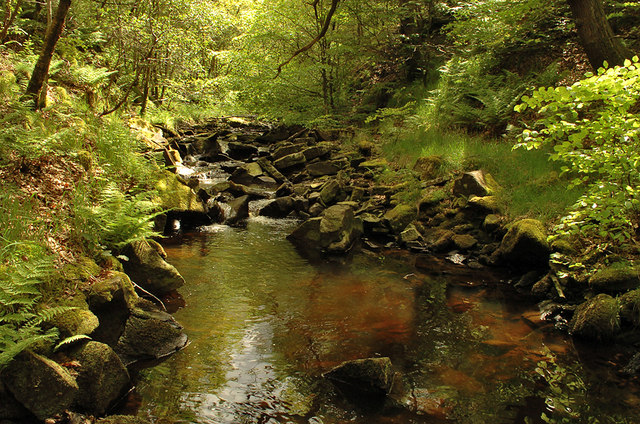
The upper reaches of the river near Roddlesworth

The River Roddlesworth (also known as Rocky Brook) is a river in Lancashire, England, a tributary of the River Darwen.

== Course ==
The source of the river is on the slopes of Great Hill, just above the ruins known as Pimm's, where the infant river is known as Calf Hey Brook. Calf Hey Brook is joined by another stream occasionally termed Roddlesworth - which rises beneath Cartridge Hill and runs past the ruins of Hollinshead Hall - beneath Slipper Lowe.

From there, it follows a northerly course through Roddlesworth Plantations, around the two reservoirs fed by the river and past Red Lees. The river continues through the Stanworth Valley in Livesey, where it is met by Stockclough Brook, and under the M65 motorway and Leeds & Liverpool Canal. Stanworth Valley was the location for some of the No M65 Road Protest camps . This was the site of a 5-day eviction in 1995, between environmentalists and road builders. At stake was the ecologically valuable river system and diverse woodland. M65 motorway archive

Soon after this, the Roddlesworth enters a culvert close to the Star Paper Mill.

The Roddlesworth flows into the River Darwen at Moulden Brow. Between the confluence with Stockclough Brook and the Darwen, the river is known locally as Moulden (or Moulding) Water.

For virtually its entire course, the Roddlesworth marks the boundary between Chorley Borough and the unitary authority of Blackburn with Darwen.

This border was preceded by that between the Hundreds of Blackburn and Leyland.

The river also demarcated the eastern edge of the region of Gunolfesmores in the Middle Ages and, later, the Manor of Hoghton.

The name is first recorded in about 1160 as Rodtholfeswrtha, suggesting a derivation meaning "the homestead of Hrothwulf".

== Settlements ==
The Roddlesworth runs through a wooded valley close to the settlements of Tockholes, Roddlesworth, Abbey Village and Stanworth before joining the River Darwen close to Feniscowles.

== Reservoirs ==
- Abbey Village Reservoir
- Lower Roddlesworth Reservoir
- Upper Roddlesworth Reservoir
- Rake Brook Reservoir is fed by Rake Brook close to its confluence with the Roddlesworth.

== Tributaries ==
Finnington Brook joins close to where the Roddlesworth itself falls into the River Darwen. Rising from the confluence of several small brooks, draining Riley Green, Marsh View and Brimmicroft, which meet close to Riley Green Bridge over the Leeds and Liverpool Canal, the brook runs eastward in a small, wooded valley below the canal. The river flows by the hamlet of Finnington, picking up other streams heading north from Stanworth, running by a hatchery and through a reservoir, joining the Roddlesworth on the south side of Moulden Water Bridge.

Stockclough Brook flows into the Roddlesworth in the Stanworth Valley, opposite the site of what was probably once a small mill. The brook rises close to Potter's and flows west and south west, skirting by Lower Whitehalgh Farm before passing beneath Stockclough Lane and the M65 Motorway. Whitehalgh Brook joins near stepping stones in Owlet Holes Wood before Stockclough Brook flows beneath the Stockclough Viaduct, over which the former railway between Cherry Tree and Chorley once ran, before joining the Roddlesworth. Whitehalgh Brook itself rises in Adam Plat Wood where three brooks from Tockholes combine. Sheep Bridge Brook rises near Tithe Barn Cottages and flows northwest towards Yew Tree Farm, before moving southwest through Hole Bottom Wood, where it flows beneath the bridge that gives the stream its name. It meets Chapels Brook, flowing northwest from Close Farm and Weasel Farm in Tockholes, following Rock Lane to Chapels Farm, after which it moves past Pickering Fold and through Heald Wood. Shaw Brook joins at the western end of Adam Plat Wood, having run west and north from its source on Green Hill, via Golden Soney Farm and Lower Hill, past Higher Crow Trees Farm and Lower Crow Trees Farm passing through a wooded vale to its confluence with Whitehalgh Brook.

Rake Brook rises at Brown Hill on Withnell Moor and flows northward, draining the west side of Cold Within Hill before pouring through Birch Clough, separating Twist Moor and Roddlesworth Moor and feeding Rake Brook Reservoir, formerly populated by Rake Wood. The confluence of Rake Brook and the River Roddlesworth is in Benson's Wood, just after the end of the overflow from the Roddlesworth Reservoirs. Rake Brook Reservoir is also fed by another stream rising on Withnell Moor. This unnamed brook flows north, separating Withnell Moor from Wheelton Moor (as well as the two civil parishes) before passing the ruins of New Temple (just south of Solomon's Temple), Summer House (formerly known as Botany Bay) and Pope's, running east of Millstone Edge, before meeting Rake Brook.
