= Heskins =

Tape and line-marking product manufacturer

- Company type: Private company
- Industry: Safety materials
- Founded: 1997; 29 years ago
- Headquarters: Brinscall, Chorley, United Kingdom
- Area served: Worldwide
- Products: Safety-Grip tape, Aqua-Safe
- Website: www.heskins.com

Heskins is a British manufacturer of self-adhesive abrasive safety tape, grip tape and heavy duty line marking products.

It operates from three facilities based in three countries in Europe and America. Its head office and main production facility is located at Brinscall, Chorley, UK.

== History ==
The company was established in 1997 as an adhesive coater, rapidly diversifying into safety tape and line markings. Heskins attained ISO9000 status in May 2001, acquiring Investors in People acclamation in 2006. Following that, Heskins was presented with an ISO 14001 certificate due to their environmental approach to their manufacturing techniques.

In 2021, Heskins other European location opened in the Netherlands under the sister company name Heskins BV.

Heskins also has an office and production site in Butler, Pennsylvania, USA. The sister company, originally named NonSlip Tapes LLC, was set up in 2009, with a small team dedicated to finding and dealing with business in North America and beyond. It was renamed to operate as Heskins LLC, a wholesale supplier aimed at the B2B market.

== Products ==
Heskins owns the trademarks Safety-Grip, Aqua-Safe, PermaStripe, PermaRoute, Tenura, H3418 and H4644.

The PermaStripe brand is a range of floor marking tape designed to effectively mark out aisles, bays, escape routes and other areas within factories and warehouses. Combining 5 different types of floor and line marking tapes named PermaStripe, PermaStripe Smooth, PermaRoute, PermaLean and PermaTop.

Tenura is a manufacturer of silicone daily living aids, designed to aid in day-to-day tasks. Since being established in 2011, Tenuras range has expanded dramatically, becoming more versatile in the silicone daily living aids it supplies.

== Online Videos ==
- Applying antislip tape
- Grip tape conformable applied onto chequer plate
- Non slip tape internal application
