= Abbey Village Reservoir =

Reservoir in Lancashire, England

- Close House Reservoir
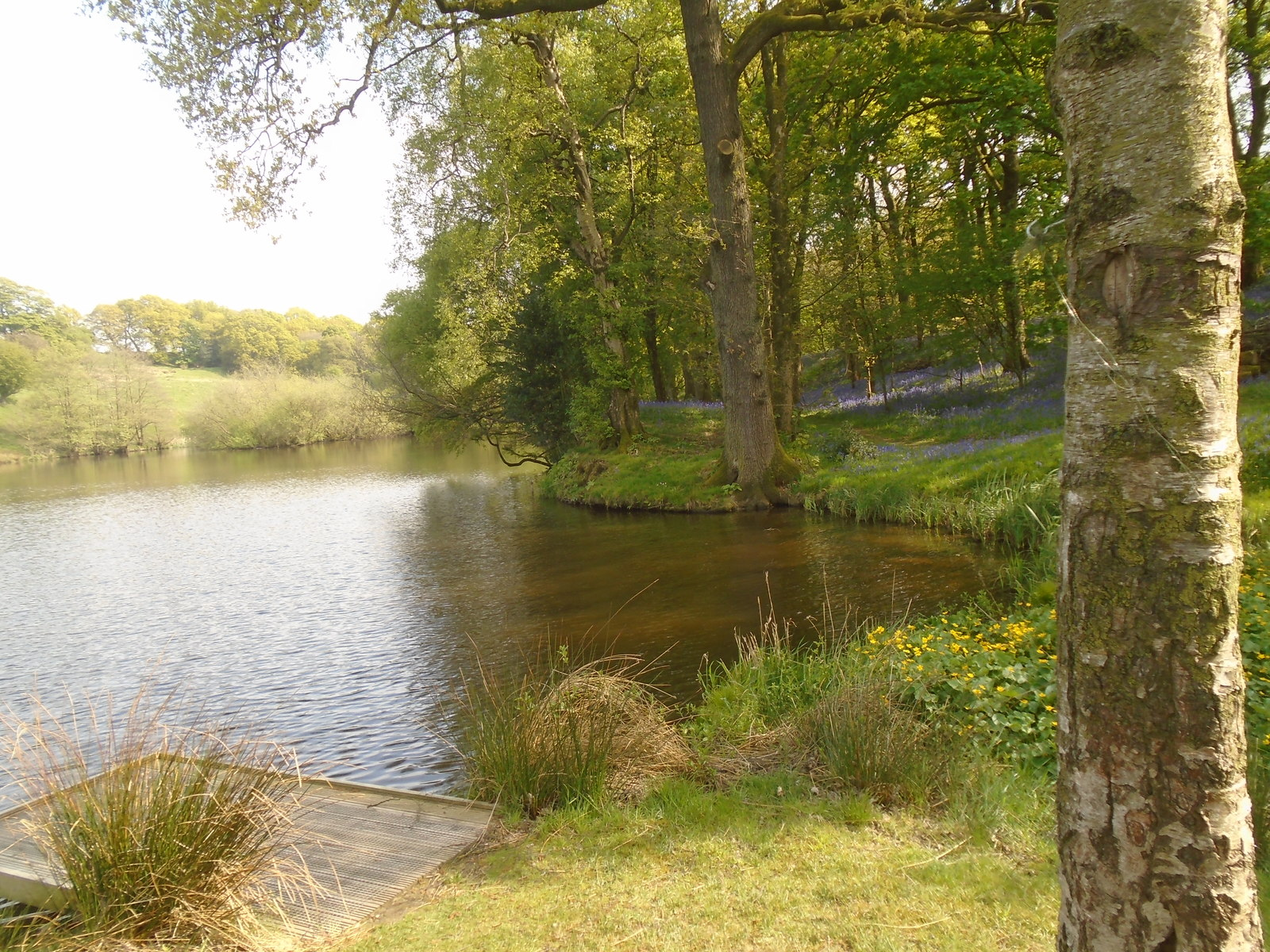
- On the western side of the reservoir

- Shown within Chorley Borough
- Location: Lancashire
- Coordinates: 53°42′16″N 2°32′29″W
- Type: reservoir
- Primary inflows: River Roddlesworth
- Primary outflows: River Roddlesworth
- Basin countries: United Kingdom

The reservoir north of Abbey Village on the River Roddlesworth - known as Close House Reservoir - is the latest addition to the reservoirs around this small Lancashire village, designed to increase water storage capacity in wet years.
