= Rake Brook Reservoir =

Reservoir in Lancashire, England

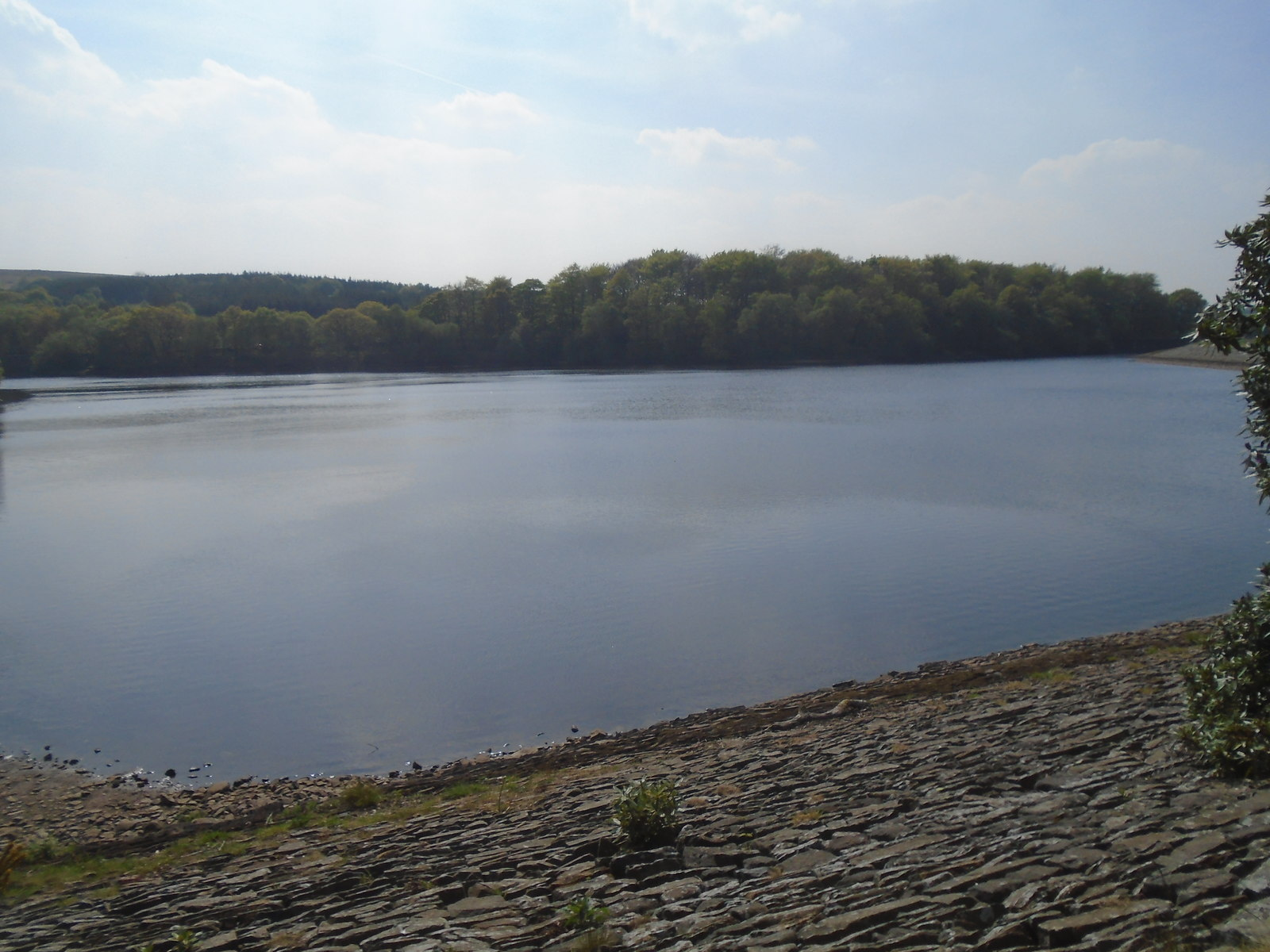
- View across the reservoir

- Shown within Chorley Borough
- Location: Lancashire
- Coordinates: 53°41′42″N 2°32′12″W
- Type: reservoir
- Primary inflows: Rake Brook
- Basin countries: United Kingdom

Rake Brook Reservoir is a reservoir fed by two streams, including the eponymous Rake Brook, a tributary of the River Roddlesworth in Lancashire, England.

The reservoir is adjacent to the two Roddlesworth Reservoirs. It was constructed in the 1850s by Thomas Hawksley for Liverpool Corporation Waterworks, and was designed to hold compensation water to maintain flows in the rivers, whereas the reservoirs at Lower Rivington, Upper Rivington and Anglezarke held water for the public water supply. Water from the reservoir was fed into Anglezarke reservoir by a 3.75-mile (6.04 km) channel called The Goit.

Construction of the reservoir was authorised by the Liverpool Corporation Waterworks Act 1847 (10 & 11 Vict. c. cclxi), and the engineer Thomas Hawksley designed an earth dam which was 85 feet (26 m) tall at its highest point and 1,490 feet (450 m) long. The reservoir was finished in 1857, and impounded 73 million imperial gallons (330 Ml) of water when full.

== Bibliography ==
- Binnie, G M (1981). Early Victorian Water Engineers. Thomas Telford. ISBN 978-0-7277-0128-2.
