= The Street (Heath Charnock) =

Coordinates: 53.6336°N 2.5762°W

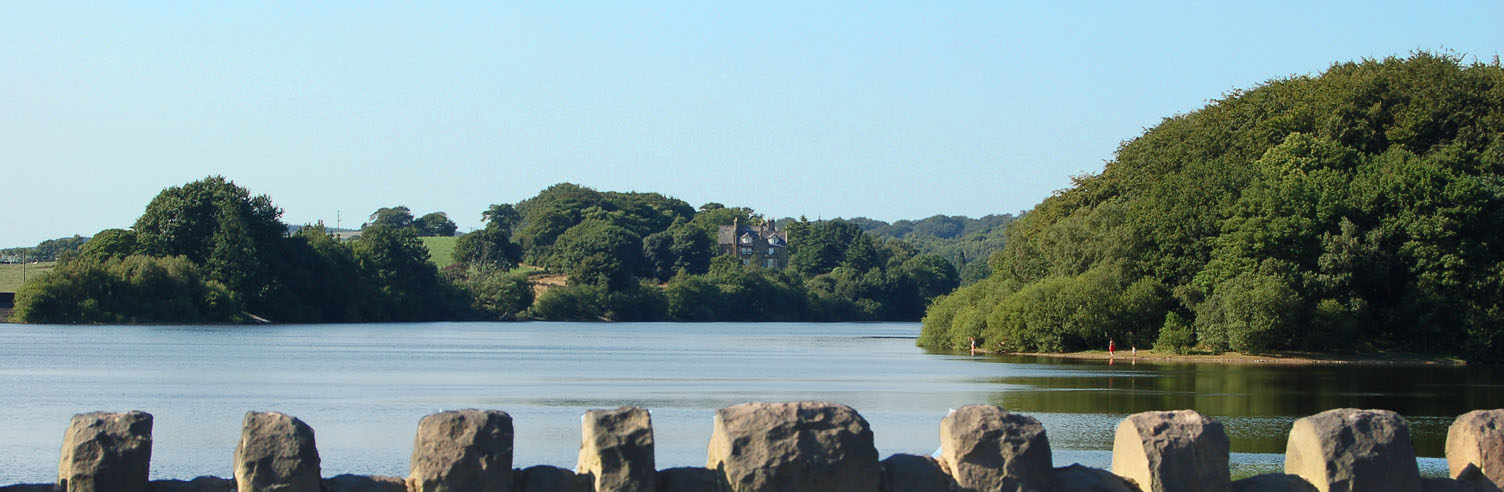
The Street, visible on the horizon

The Street is a historical property on a bridleway of the same name in Heath Charnock in the Borough of Chorley, Lancashire, England. It is located on the western banks of the Upper Rivington reservoir and close to the boundary with the village of Rivington. It has been converted to apartments.

Alexander Street took his name from the property when he was the owner of the estate in 1534. After his death, a distant cousin attempted to gain control of the building, but was evicted after a presumptuous attempt to act as a guardian to the deceased's children.

After the reservoir was built in 1850, the house was demolished and rebuilt with compensation from Liverpool Corporation. In 1853, the property was owned by Peter Martin, who also owned Street Wood and Blindhurst Farm. Major renovation was undertaken, including vineries in the expansive gardens.

Chorley Borough Council considered demolishing the structure following the demolition of many other large historic buildings in the village. It was rebuilt and although the roof was removed, the ornate and distinct chimneys remained.

Opposite the property is a pets' grave, paying tribute to a trio of cats and dogs that died between 1900 and 1902.
