= Liverpool Corporation Waterworks =

Water authority in the United Kingdom

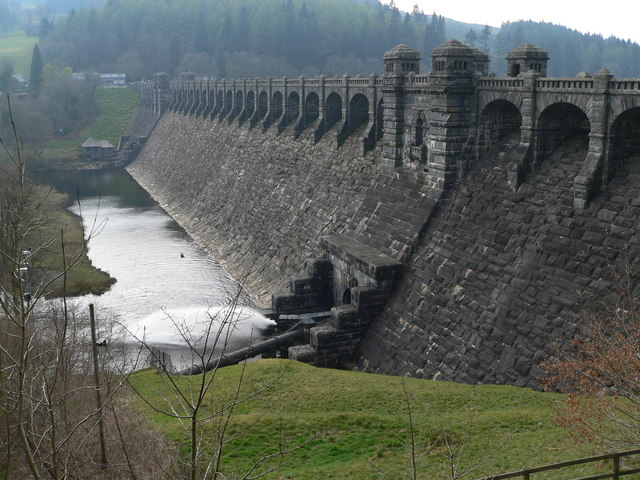
- The Lake Vyrnwy dam was built to impound drinking water for Liverpool in the 1880s.
- Industry: Water and sewage
- Founded: 1847
- Fate: Taken over
- Successor: North West Water Authority
- Headquarters: Liverpool, England
- Key people: James Newlands, Thomas Hawksley

Liverpool Corporation Waterworks and its successors have provided a public water supply and sewerage and sewage treatment services to the city of Liverpool, England. In 1625 water was obtained from a single well and delivered by cart, but as the town grew, companies supplied water to homes through pipes. There were two main companies by the 1840s, but the water supply was intermittent, and there was general dissatisfaction with the service. Liverpool Corporation decided that such an important service should be provided by a public body, and sought to take over the water supply companies.

A series of acts of Parliament were obtained, the first being the Liverpool Act 1846 (9 & 10 Vict. c. cxxvii), which created three key posts, the Medical Officer of Health, the Inspector of Nuisances, and the Borough Engineer. The latter post was filled by James Newlands, a visionary man who defined the role of the Borough Engineer, to be copied by many other towns and cities. He set about creating large scale maps of Liverpool, building a water-based sewerage system, making provision for bath houses, wash houses, swimming lessons, minimum sizes for rooms, paving and street lighting. The sewage was emptied into the River Mersey for the tides to take away, but he saw this as an interim measure, with a sewage treatment works being required. This part of his vision was not implemented until the 1980s.

The second act was the Liverpool Corporation Waterworks Act 1847 (10 & 11 Vict. c. cclxi), which allowed the corporation to buy out the private water companies, and subsequent acts authorised the construction of reservoirs, initially on Rivington Pike, where a total of eight reservoirs were eventually completed, most of the work being overseen by the engineer Thomas Hawksley. The work included sand filters to treat the water before it entered a pipeline to Liverpool. The volume of water that this scheme supplied was rather less than that estimated, and the promised constant supply of water to residents reverted to an intermittent supply, as the population expanded and the volume of water used by households increased. This issue was eventually resolved by building the Vyrnwy Reservoir in Wales and a 68-mile (109 km) aqueduct to convey the water to Liverpool.

Following the Water Act 1973 (c. 37), both water supply and sewerage services were taken over from the corporation by the North West Water Authority, which subsequently became United Utilities. Newlands' vision for a sewage treatment works was realised in 1991, when a works was completed in Sandon Dock, which was extended by a £200 million upgrade in 2016, utilising the adjacent Wellington Dock. Hawksley's sand filters for the Rivington chain of reservoirs were replaced by a £38.9-million water treatment works in 1994, although the water is now used to supply Wigan rather than Liverpool. The Liverpool Sanatory Act 1846 (9 & 10 Vict. c. cxxvii) became the model for the Public Health Act 1848 (11 & 12 Vict. c. 63), which saw many other towns benefit from the reforms Newlands introduced. He reduced mortality in Liverpool significantly, and crowds lined the streets for his funeral in 1871.

== History ==
Liverpool Water Supply Act 1709
- Act of Parliament
- Parliament of Great Britain
- Long title: An Act to enable the Corporation of Leverpoole to make a Grant to Sir Cleve More Baronet, for Liberty to bring fresh Water into the said Town of Leverpoole.
- Citation: 8 Ann. c. 21 Pr. (Note: This is the citation in The Statutes of the Realm.); 8 Ann. c. 25 Pr. (Note: This is the citation in The Statutes at Large.)
- Territorial extent: Great Britain

Dates
- Royal assent: 5 April 1710
- Commencement: 15 November 1709 (Note: Start of session.)
- Repealed: 1 April 1922
Other legislation
Repealed by	Liverpool Corporation Act 1921

Status: Repealed

Liverpool Water Supply Act 1799
- Act of Parliament
- Parliament of Great Britain
- Long title: An act for better supplying the town and port of Liverpool with water, from certain springs in the township of Bootle in the county palatine of Lancaster.
- Citation: 39 Geo. 3. c. xxxvi
- Territorial extent: Great Britain

Dates
- Royal assent: 13 June 1799
- Commencement: 13 June 1799 (Note: The Acts of Parliament (Commencement) Act 1793.)
- Repealed: 1 April 1922
Other legislation
Amended by	Liverpool Water Act 1810; Liverpool Water Act 1813
Repealed by	Liverpool Corporation Act 1921

Status: Repealed

Text of statute as originally enacted

Liverpool Water Act 1810
- Act of Parliament
- Parliament of the United Kingdom
- Long title: An Act to alter, amend and enlarge the Powers of an Act passed in the Thirty ninth Year of His present Majesty, for better supplying the Town and Port of Liverpool with Water, from certain Springs in the Township of Bootle, in the County Palatine of Lancaster.
- Citation: 50 Geo. 3. c. clxv
- Territorial extent: United Kingdom

Dates
- Royal assent: 9 June 1810
- Commencement: 9 June 1810
- Repealed: 1 April 1922
Other legislation
Amends	Liverpool Water Supply Act 1799
Amended by	Liverpool Water Act 1813
Repealed by	Liverpool Corporation Act 1921

Status: Repealed

Text of statute as originally enacted

Liverpool Water Act 1813
- Act of Parliament
- Parliament of the United Kingdom
- Long title: An Act for enlarging the Powers of Two Acts of His present Majesty, for better supplying the Town and Port of Liverpool with Water.
- Citation: 53 Geo. 3. c. cxxii
- Territorial extent: United Kingdom

Dates
- Royal assent: 3 June 1813
- Commencement: 3 June 1813
- Repealed: 1 April 1922
Other legislation
Amends	Liverpool Water Supply Act 1799; Liverpool Water Act 1810
Repealed by	Liverpool Corporation Act 1921

Status: Repealed

Text of statute as originally enacted

Liverpool Water Act 1822
- Act of Parliament
- Parliament of the United Kingdom
- Long title: An Act to repeal so much of an Act of the Twenty-sixth Year of His late Majesty as relates to the supplying the Town of Liverpool, in the County Palatine of Lancaster, with Water, and to grant other Powers for supplying the said Town and Port, and the Shipping resorting thereto, with Water.
- Citation: 3 Geo. 4. c. lxxvii
- Territorial extent: United Kingdom

Dates
- Royal assent: 24 June 1822
- Commencement: 24 June 1822
- Repealed: 1 April 1922
Other legislation
Amends	Liverpool Improvement Act 1786
Repealed by	Liverpool Corporation Act 1921

Status: Repealed

Text of statute as originally enacted

The city of Liverpool sits on a bed of lower new red sandstone, which is covered by a layer of clay, up to 26 feet (7.9 m) thick. Early water supply was from wells dug down into the sandstone aquifer. The principal supply in 1625 was Fall Well, near St John's Lane, from which water was supplied to the seven or eight streets that formed Liverpool by cart. The first known commercial supply of water was in 1694, when a company was granted permission by Liverpool Corporation to supply Liverpool with water from springs at Bootle. The permission was passed to Sir Cleave Moore in 1710 by the Liverpool Water Supply Act 1709 (8 Ann. c. 21 Pr.), and construction of a masonry culvert began, but was abandoned. The engineer Thomas Steers was associated with the waterworks in 1720, as were Sir Thomas Johnson and Sir Cleave Moore. The company had a reservoir and a 2 hp (1.5 kW) steam engine which pumped the water into wooden pipes. Duncan, writing in 1853, suggests that the Bootle company combined with another company, known as the Liverpool and Harrington Company, in 1799, to more effectively supply Liverpool with water. Thomas Telford was linked to the Bootle Waterworks between 1799 and 1802, and Thomas Simpson was linked to the Harrington Waterworks in 1799. However, Sheard, writing in 1993, suggests that the Bootle company, formally known as the Liverpool Waterworks Company, was formed by the Liverpool Water Supply Act 1799 (39 Geo. 3. c. xxxvi), while the Harrington company, which was officially the Liverpool Corporation Waterworks, although it is unclear whether there was any formal link with the corporation, was formed by the Liverpool Water Act 1822 (3 Geo. 4. c. lxxvii). These dates were also quoted in the preamble to the Liverpool Corporation Waterworks Act 1847 (10 & 11 Vict. c. cclxi). The two companies agreed to divide up Liverpool and each supply their own area, rather than competing. The Bootle company had obtained acts of Parliament, the Liverpool Water Act 1810 (50 Geo. 3. c. clxv) and Liverpool Water Act 1813 (53 Geo. 3. c. cxxii) allowing them to supply water to Bootle, Linacre, Kirkdale, Everton and West Derby.

The Harrington Company extracted their water from boreholes, of which they had 17, varying in depth from 13 feet (4.0 m) to 600 feet (180 m). The water was pumped into a network of iron pipes by three steam engines, and some was stored in four reservoirs. They supplied 1,102,000 imperial gallons (5.01 Ml) per day, and the reservoirs could hold a total of 1,871,176 imperial gallons (8.50653 Ml). Liverpool experienced a number of fires in 1840, and the failure of the water companies to supply sufficient water to extinguish them resulted in widespread damage. Consequently, an independent water supply for fighting fires and flushing sewers was proposed by the Highways Board, for which the engineer was James Simpson. Work on a well at Green Lane, 185 feet (56 m) deep, began in 1841, from which the water was pumped by a steam engine and stored in a reservoir at Kensington Fields holding 8 million imperial gallons (36 Ml). A network of cast iron pipes conveyed the water through the city, and the system was completed in 1847. The reservoir was subsequently covered, to reduce the growth of green algae, and was extended to hold 21 million imperial gallons (95 Ml). The scheme provided a constant water supply, although Simpson stated that a constant supply for the whole city would be useless, a view for which he was attacked in the Liverpool Post newspaper.

Water supply was intermittent, in some cases only being available for a short period three times a week, and there was dissatisfaction with the service provided. In 1845, the Liverpool Guardian Society for the Protection of Trade demanded that an inquiry be held, as the water companies' shares were over-valued, and they thought that the water supply was "not only miserably inadequate but the most expensive in the country." A special committee of the Highways Board sat to consider the evidence, and concluded that such a vital resource as a clean water supply ought to be managed by a public body, rather than private companies. At the time, the mechanisms by which water-borne diseases such as cholera and typhoid were transmitted was poorly understood, but the theory that they were miasmic, that is, spread by airborne smells, at least meant that the action to deal with the smells actually resolved the problem. Engineers were in short supply, as most were occupied by the railway mania, but the corporation obtained the services of the Scottish engineer James Newlands, who became the first Borough Engineer. He produced a detailed report on sewerage in April 1846, which the corporation adopted in July.

Liverpool Corporation Waterworks Act 1847 (Note: Section 2.)
- Act of Parliament
- Parliament of the United Kingdom
- Long title: An Act for better supplying with Water the Borough of Liverpool and the Neighbourhood thereof, and for authorizing the Mayor, Aldermen, and Burgesses of the said Borough to purchase the Liverpool and Harrington Waterworks and Liverpool Waterworks.
- Citation: 10 & 11 Vict. c. cclxi
- Territorial extent: United Kingdom

Dates
- Royal assent: 22 July 1847
- Commencement: 22 July 1847
Other legislation
Amended by	Liverpool Corporation Waterworks (Amendment) Act 1850; Liverpool Corporation Waterworks Act 1855; Liverpool Corporation Waterworks Act 1860; Liverpool Corporation Waterworks Act 1862; Liverpool Corporation Waterworks Act 1866; Liverpool Improvement and Waterworks Act 1871

Status: Amended

Text of statute as originally enacted

They obtained the Liverpool Sanatory Act 1846 (9 & 10 Vict. c. cxxvii) to allow work on the construction of sewers and other works to begin, but the city was struck by another epidemic of cholera in 1847. A second enquiry was held in February 1847, to consider how Liverpool Corporation might take over the private water companies, and having valued the companies at £537,000, they sought an act of Parliament to authorise their actions. The Liverpool Corporation Waterworks Act 1847 (10 & 11 Vict. c. cclxi) was granted in July of that year, and the transfer took effect immediately. The water engineer Thomas Hawksley worked on the water supply schemes, while Newlands worked on the sewerage system.

Liverpool Corporation Waterworks (Amendment) Act 1850 (Note: Section 26.)
- Act of Parliament
- Parliament of the United Kingdom
- Long title: An Act to extend the Time limited by the Liverpool Corporation Waterworks Act, 1847, for purchasing Lands and constructing the Works authorized by such Act, and for other Purposes.
- Citation: 10 & 11 Vict. c. cclxi
- Territorial extent: United Kingdom

Dates
- Royal assent: 29 July 1850
- Commencement: 29 July 1850
- Repealed: 1 April 1922
Other legislation
Amends	Liverpool Corporation Waterworks Act 1847
Amended by	Liverpool Corporation Waterworks (Deviations) Act 1852; Liverpool Corporation Waterworks Act 1855; Liverpool Corporation Waterworks Act 1860; Liverpool Corporation Waterworks Act 1862; Liverpool Improvement and Waterworks Act 1871
Repealed by	Liverpool Corporation Act 1921
Relates to	Lands Clauses Consolidation Act 1845; Liverpool Sanitation Act 1846

Status: Repealed

Text of statute as originally enacted

Liverpool Corporation Waterworks (Deviations) Act 1852 (Note: Section 1.)
- Act of Parliament
- Parliament of the United Kingdom
- Long title: An Act for further amending the Local and Personal Acts, Ninth and Tenth of Victoria, Chapter One hundred and twenty-seven, and Tenth and Eleventh of Victoria, Chapter Two hundred and sixty-one, relating to the Liverpool Corporation Waterworks; and for authorizing Deviations, and the Construction of Reservoirs; and for other Purposes.
- Citation: 15 & 16 Vict. c. xlvii
- Territorial extent: United Kingdom

Dates
- Royal assent: 28 May 1852
- Commencement: 28 May 1852
- Repealed: 1 April 1922
Other legislation
Amends	Liverpool Sanitation Act 1846; Liverpool Corporation Waterworks Act 1847; Liverpool Corporation Waterworks (Amendment) Act 1850
Amended by	Liverpool Corporation Waterworks Act 1855; Liverpool Corporation Waterworks Act 1860
Repealed by	Liverpool Corporation Act 1921

Status: Repealed

Text of statute as originally enacted

Liverpool Corporation Waterworks Act 1855 (Note: Section 1.)
- Act of Parliament
- Parliament of the United Kingdom
- Long title: An Act for amending the several Acts relating to the Liverpool Corporation Waterworks, and for authorizing Deviations and the Construction of Works; and for other Purposes.
- Citation: 18 & 19 Vict. c. lxvi
- Territorial extent: United Kingdom

Dates
- Royal assent: 15 June 1855
- Commencement: 15 June 1855
Other legislation
Amends	Liverpool Corporation Waterworks Act 1847; Liverpool Corporation Waterworks (Amendment) Act 1850; Liverpool Corporation Waterworks (Deviations) Act 1852
Amended by	Liverpool Corporation Waterworks Act 1860; Liverpool Corporation Act 1921; [[]]
Relates to	Lands Clauses Consolidation Act, 1845

Status: Partially repealed

Text of statute as originally enacted

The 1847 act was amended by the Liverpool Corporation Waterworks (Amendment) Act 1850 (10 & 11 Vict. c. cclxi), the Liverpool Corporation Waterworks (Deviations) Act 1852 (15 & 16 Vict. c. xlvii) and the Liverpool Corporation Waterworks Act 1855 (18 & 19 Vict. c. lxvi).

=== Water supply ===
There was initially some disagreement between the two engineers over how to secure a reliable water supply. Newlands and James Simpson, who had some success in constructing wells in Liverpool during the 1840s, recommended an extension of the system of wells, whereas Hawksley favoured bringing water into the town by gravity from a network of reservoirs in the Rivington Pike area. Although the estimated costs of this scheme had risen from £200,000 to £450,000 between 1847 and 1850, there was a majority within the council who supported it. The Liverpool Corporation Waterworks Act 1847 had previously authorised the Rivington Pike scheme, but a change in the makeup of the council resulted in a majority being against building it. However, they discovered that the contracts for the Rivington Pike Waterworks had already been awarded, and despite the legal obstacles, convened a court of enquiry to see if it was possible to reverse the decision. The council asked Robert Stephenson to arbitrate, and agreed to abide by his decision. He reported that the well scheme would be cheaper if less than 8 million imperial gallons (36 Ml) of water per day were required, but that the Rivington Pike scheme was better for larger volumes, and he therefore recommended that option. His estimate that it could easily supply 12 to 13 million imperial gallons (55 to 59 Ml) per day was over-optimistic, as Parliament decided that the scheme should also supply 8.3 million imperial gallons (38 Ml) of compensation water per day, to maintain flows in the rivers.

The Rivington Pike scheme gathered water from 10,000 acres (40 km^{2}) of moorland, in an area which supplied the River Ribble and the River Douglas. Hawksley planned to build five dams to impound his reservoirs, each with a central clay core and an earth embankment, with a slope of three-to-one on the upstream side and two-to-one on the downstream side. The upstream faces were protected by stone pitching, to prevent wave action eroding the dam, with supply shafts and a shaft to allow the release of compensation water constructed of blue brick upstream of the clay core, but within the structure of the dam. These linked to horizontal culverts, which passed beneath the dam. Although other schemes of the period assumed that spring water could be used untreated, Hawksley constructed 4 acres (1.6 ha) of slow sand filters to effectively filter the water before it entered a pipeline which was 17.3 miles (27.8 km) long and 44 inches (1,100 mm) in diameter. At the time it was the longest water supply pipeline to have been constructed. Three of the reservoirs, at Lower Rivington, Upper Rivington and Anglezarke, were used to hold water for consumption. Compensation water was stored in two further reservoirs built at a higher level, at Rake Brook and Lower Roddlesworth, and linked to the first three by an open channel called the Goit, which ran for 3.75 miles (6 km), and also served to collect water from the area between the two sets of reservoirs. The scheme as built impounded a total of 3,040 million imperial gallons (13,800 Ml) of water.

Chorley Waterworks Transfer Act 1856 (Note: Section 12.)
- Act of Parliament
- Parliament of the United Kingdom
- Long title: An Act for vesting in the Mayor, Aldermen, and Burgesses of the Borough of Liverpool the Undertaking of the Chorley Waterworks Company, and for other Purposes.
- Citation: 19 & 20 Vict. c. v.
- Territorial extent: United Kingdom

Dates
- Royal assent: 29 April 1856
- Commencement: 29 April 1856
- Repealed: 31 October 1984
Other legislation
Amends	Chorley Waterworks Act 1846; Chorley Waterworks Act 1851
Repealed by	County of Lancashire Act 1984
Relates to	Chorley Waterworks Act 1846; Liverpool Corporation Waterworks Act 1847; Liverpool Corporation Waterworks Amendment Act 1850; Chorley Waterworks Act 1851

Status: Repealed

Text of statute as originally enacted

In 1856, Liverpool Corporation Waterworks bought out Chorley Waterworks, authorised by an act of Parliament, the Chorley Waterworks Transfer Act 1856 (19 & 20 Vict. c. v.), obtained in April 1856. Chorley also owned a reservoir on Rivington Pike, just to the east of Anglezarke. The High Bullough Reservoir had been built by John Frederick Bateman, who had estimated the cost of the project while working for Edwin Chadwick's Towns Improvement Company, and had then acted as engineer for the project. The reservoir was operational by 1850, with the outlet consisting of a pipe running through the dam, and supported by two masonry piers where it ran through the central clay puddle. The outlet valve was at the downstream end of the dam, and although this configuration is no longer thought to be good practice, there were no serious issues with the reservoir throughout its operational life.

Liverpool Corporation Waterworks Act 1860 (Note: Section 1.)
- Act of Parliament
- Parliament of the United Kingdom
- Long title: An Act to empower the Mayor Aldermen and Burgesses of the Borough of Liverpool to construct an additional Reservoir and other Works; and for other Purposes.
- Citation: 23 & 24 Vict. c. xii
- Territorial extent: United Kingdom

Dates
- Royal assent: 15 May 1860
- Commencement: 15 May 1860
- Repealed: 1 April 1922
Other legislation
Amends	Liverpool Corporation Waterworks Act 1847; Liverpool Corporation Waterworks (Amendment) Act 1850; Liverpool Corporation Waterworks (Deviations) Act 1852; Liverpool Corporation Waterworks Act 1855
Repealed by	Liverpool Corporation Act 1921
Relates to	Lands Clauses Consolidation Act 1845; Waterworks Clauses Act 1847

Status: Repealed

Text of statute as originally enacted

The corporation obtained another act of Parliament, the Liverpool Corporation Waterworks Act 1860 (23 & 24 Vict. c. xii), to authorise the construction of the Upper Roddlesworth Reservoir. The dam was 1,190 feet (360 m) long, and was 69 feet (21 m) high above the original ground level at its tallest point. It increased the total storage capacity of the Rivington scheme by about six per cent, but the volume of water entering the supply did not increase. It is unclear who designed and oversaw the construction, but it was not Hawksley, and a number of issues have occurred since its completion in 1865. Swallow holes appeared in the dam in 1904 and 1908, and the toe of the dam consisted of sand, which washed away in 1954 due to heavy rain, resulting in a slip on the downstream side of the dam, and requiring the construction of a drainage system to prevent a reoccurrence. The 1860 act had also authorised the construction of Yarrow Reservoir, near the lower end of Anglezarke, which was completed in 1875, but only permitted a small increase in the volume entering supply. Work on the dam had begun in 1867, to the designs of Thomas Duncan, the successor to Newlands as Borough Engineer for Liverpool, and had been completed by Joseph Jackson, an engineer from Bolton, after Duncan died.

Liverpool Corporation Waterworks Act 1862 (Note: Section 1.)
- Act of Parliament
- Parliament of the United Kingdom
- Long title: An Act to empower the Mayor Aldermen and Burgesses of the Borough of Liverpool to construct an additional Reservoir and other Works; and for other Purposes.
- Citation: 25 & 26 Vict. c. cvii
- Territorial extent: United Kingdom

Dates
- Royal assent: 30 June 1862
- Commencement: 1 January 1863 (Note: Section 3.)
- Repealed: 1 April 1922
Other legislation
Amends	Liverpool Corporation Waterworks Act 1847; Liverpool Corporation Waterworks (Amendment) Act 1850
Amended by	Liverpool Improvement and Waterworks Act 1871
Repealed by	Liverpool Corporation Act 1921
Relates to	Lands Clauses Consolidation Act 1845; Waterworks Clauses Act 1847; Liverpool Corporation Waterworks (Deviations) Act 1852; Liverpool Corporation Waterworks Act 1855; Lands Clauses Consolidation Acts Amendment Act 1860; Liverpool Corporation Waterworks Act 1860

Status: Repealed

Text of statute as originally enacted

Liverpool Corporation Waterworks Act 1866 (Note: Section 1.)
- Act of Parliament
- Parliament of the United Kingdom
- Long title: An Act to empower the Mayor, Aldermen, and Burgesses of the Borough of Liverpool to construct a Reservoir, Roads, and other Works, to obtain Water from the River Roddiesworth; and for other Purposes.
- Citation: 29 & 30 Vict. c. cxxvi
- Territorial extent: United Kingdom

Dates
- Royal assent: 28 June 1866
- Commencement: 28 June 1866
Other legislation
Amends	Liverpool Corporation Waterworks Act 1847
Amended by	Liverpool Corporation Act 1921
Relates to	Lands Clauses Consolidation Act 1845; Waterworks Clauses Act 1847; Lands Clauses Consolidation Acts Amendment Act 1860; Liverpool Corporation Waterworks Act 1862; Waterworks Clauses Act 1863

Status: Partially repealed

Text of statute as originally enacted

Liverpool Improvement and Waterworks Act 1871 (Note: Section 1.)
- Act of Parliament
- Parliament of the United Kingdom
- Long title: An Act to empower the Mayor Aldermen and Burgesses of the Borough of Liverpool to construct an additional Reservoir and other Works; and for other Purposes.
- Citation: 34 & 35 Vict. c. clxxxiv
- Territorial extent: Liverpool (Note: Section 5.)

Dates
- Royal assent: 31 July 1871
- Commencement: 31 July 1871
Other legislation
Amends	Liverpool Sanitation Act 1846; Liverpool Corporation Waterworks Act 1847; Liverpool Corporation Waterworks Amendment Act 1850; Liverpool Improvement Act 1858; Liverpool Improvement Act 1861; Liverpool Corporation Waterworks Act 1862; Liverpool Improvement Act 1864; Liverpool Improvement Act 1865; Liverpool Improvement Act 1867
Amended by	Liverpool Corporation Waterworks Act 1880; Liverpool Corporation Act 1921
Relates to	Building Act 1842; Liverpool Improvement Act 1842; Lands Clauses Consolidation Act 1845; Waterworks Clauses Act 1847; Liverpool Corporation Waterworks (Deviations) Act 1852; Liverpool Library and Museum Act 1852; Liverpool Sanitary Amendment Act 1854; Liverpool Improvement Act 1855; Liverpool Improvement Act 1858; Lands Clauses Consolidation Acts Amendment Act 1860; Liverpool Improvement Act 1861; Liverpool Sanitary Amendment Act 1864; Liverpool Corporation Waterworks Act 1866; Lands Clauses Consolidation Act 1869

Status: Partially repealed

Text of statute as originally enacted

In 1862, 1866 and 1871, the corporation obtained further acts of Parliament, the Liverpool Corporation Waterworks Act 1862 (25 & 26 Vict. c. cvii), the Liverpool Corporation Waterworks Act 1866 and the Liverpool Improvement and Waterworks Act 1871 (34 & 35 Vict. c. clxxxiv), respectively, to further improve the waterworks.

When the Rivington Pike scheme had been promoted, it had been assumed that it would provide enough water for a constant supply to homes, as well as water to flush an arterial drainage system. However, the scheme only yielded about 16 million imperial gallons (73 Ml) per day, some 6 million imperial gallons (27 Ml) short of Hawksley's estimate, and by 1872, faced with a rapid increase in the population of Liverpool and growing demands for water, this was no longer adequate to provide a constant supply. In 1874, the corporation therefore asked Jackson to assess all of the schemes which had been proposed since 1826. He considered six such schemes, four in the Lake District, using Ullswater, Haweswater, Windermere, and the headwaters of the River Lune and River Hodder, one in Wales, using Bala Lake, and the scheme which Jackson favoured, using the headwaters of the River Brock, a tributary of the River Wyre, some 40 miles (64 km) to the north of the city. In May, the Water Committee sought second opinions, and approached Hawksley and Bateman. Hawksley supported Jackson's proposal, but Bateman felt that it was flawed in a number of areas, and suggested instead a joint scheme with Manchester to use water from Ullswater.

=== Vyrnwy scheme ===
Liverpool Corporation Waterworks Act 1880 (Note: Section 1.)
- Act of Parliament
- Parliament of the United Kingdom
- Long title: An Act for enabling the Mayor, Aldermen, and Citizens of the City of Liverpool in the county of Lancaster to obtain a supply of Water from the Rivers Vyrnwy, Marchnant, and Afon Cowny in Montgomeryshire; and for other purposes.
- Citation: 43 & 44 Vict. c. cxliii
- Territorial extent: United Kingdom

Dates
- Royal assent: 6 August 1880
- Commencement: 6 August 1880
Other legislation
Amends	Liverpool Corporation Waterworks Act 1847; Liverpool Improvement and Waterworks Act 1871
Amended by	Liverpool Corporation Act 1921
Relates to	Municipal Corporations Act 1835; Lands Clauses Consolidation Acts 1845; Waterworks Clauses Act 1847; Lands Clauses Consolidation Acts 1860; Waterworks Clauses Act 1863; Lands Clauses Consolidation Acts 1869; Liverpool Improvement and Waterworks Act 1871Public Health Act 1875; Liverpool Corporation Act 1880; Liverpool Corporation Loans Act 1880

Status: Amended

Text of statute as originally enacted

The valley of the River Vyrnwy had been proposed as a source of water for London in 1865, but in 1877 a civil engineer from Wigan called Hugh Williams suggested that it could provide a gravity supply for Liverpool. He expected to be involved in its development, but instead the Water Committee asked their Borough Engineer, G. F. Deacon, to produce a report, which he did on 18 December 1877. Manchester were not keen on the joint Ullswater scheme, and this was dropped in June 1879. With only one scheme left, parliamentary approval was sought and obtained in the Liverpool Corporation Waterworks Act 1880 (43 & 44 Vict. c. cxliii) for the Vyrnwy Reservoir and aqueduct on 6 August 1880. Deacon then carried out a thorough survey, including trial borings and shafts to ensure that the dam site was suitable, and on 2 March 1881 Hawksley was appointed as Chief Engineer, to be assisted by Deacon. The work included the construction of a dam and 68 miles (109 km) of aqueduct to convey the water to Liverpool.

Hawksley was an experienced engineer in his early seventies, whereas Deacon had no experience of such large projects. The two worked together on promoting the bill through Parliament, and both signed some of the early drawings for the dam, but Hawksley was not prepared to allow the cooperation to continue. In February 1885 both were asked for estimates of the cost to complete the project, and provided quite different answers. The bill had stated it would cost £1,250,000. Deacon estimated the actual cost at £1,773,508, while Hawksley quoted £2,183,750. When a member of the Water Committee stated that they had been betrayed by the engineers, Hawksley resigned, but was persuaded to return. However, in May 1885, Hawksley learned that Deacon had been officially appointed as joint engineer in March 1881, and resigned again. There was a dispute about the amount of money still owing to Hawksley, which was settled by arbitration, with the judgment in favour of Hawksley, with the corporation having to pay him an extra £14,123. Deacon was replaced as City Engineer, and devoted himself to the Vyrnwy project, with the water supply coming on line in 1892, and the second phase of the project completed in 1910.

=== Sewerage ===
Liverpool Sanitation Act 1846
- Act of Parliament
- Parliament of the United Kingdom
- Long title: An Act for the Improvement of the Sewerage and Drainage of the Borough of Liverpool, and for making further Provisions for the sanatory Regulation of the said Borough.
- Citation: 9 & 10 Vict. c. cxxvii
- Territorial extent: United Kingdom

Dates
- Royal assent: 26 June 1846
- Commencement: 26 June 1846
- Repealed: 1 April 1922
Other legislation
Amended by	Liverpool Corporation Waterworks (Deviations) Act 1852
Repealed by	Liverpool Corporation Act 1921

Status: Repealed

The Liverpool Sanitation Act 1846 (9 & 10 Vict. c. cxxvii), also known as the Liverpool Sanatory Act 1846, took effect from 1 January 1847, and made provision for three key personnel. There was to be a Medical Officer of Health, which was filled by William Henry Duncan. He had supplied Edwin Chadwick with much information on conditions in Liverpool while he was researching his book, The sanitary conditions on the Labouring Classes in Britain, which was published in 1842 and was a major influence on sanitary reforms. The second key person was the Inspector of Nuisances, held by Thomas Fresh, while the third was the Borough Engineer, a post held initially by James Newlands. Liverpool had previously had two town surveyors, John Foster senior and John Foster junior, but their remit had been very narrow, and so they had done little to improve drainage within the town. Water flowed downhill towards the River Mersey, but there were problems with flooding when there was heavy rainfall.

Newlands found that existing surveys of Liverpool were inadequate for his requirements, and set about producing accurate plans at a scale of 1-to-240, for which he employed his own surveyors, rather than using the Ordnance Survey or the army corps of engineers. They made some 3,000 geodetic measurements, and his first report of April 1848 was expansive in its content. It included surface water drainage, the introduction of water closets to replace cesspits and privies, a water-based sewerage system, minimum sizes for rooms in houses, provision for swimming lessons, public baths, wash houses, and also suggested that planning of new streets to reduce the costs of drainage should fall within his remit, as should the outlying villages of Everton, Kirkdale and Toxteth Park, which he thought would soon become part of a larger urban Liverpool.

Construction of the first integrated sewerage system in Britain began in 1848, and was keenly observed by many who were involved in public health and civil engineering. The main sewers were egg-shaped, to ensure that they were flushed even when low volumes of water were present, and were 3 feet (91 cm) by 1-foot-10-inch (56 cm) brick structures. Edwin Chadwick had championed glazed pipe sewers for connections to houses, despite opposition from engineers, and Newlands adopted these. Gullies were built with traps to contain noxious smells, but this resulted in sewer gases building up within the system. He wanted to burn these off by linking the sewers to a redundant chimney, but the council would not allow it. By 1851, 17 miles (27 km) of main sewers had been built, and this had increased to around 300 miles (480 km) by 1869. There were some attempts to use sewage for land improvement, with the private Sewage Utilization Company spraying it on land near Sandhills, but the company was in financial difficulties by 1869.

Because the sewers were constructed at a level below that of most building foundations, they reduced issues with rising damp in buildings considerably. As an interim measure, the sewers emptied into the Mersey, where the fast tides carried the effluent away, but Newlands was clear that what was required was a central treatment plant, but it was not until 1984 that such a plan was implemented. There were some problems with the system initially, due to the Rivington Pike scheme providing significantly less water than envisaged. Overcrowding was an issue, exacerbated by 300,000 Irish immigrants fleeing the Great Famine in 1846, and not helped by the council demolishing houses deemed to be unsanitary in the 1850s.

Nevertheless, Newlands gained recognition for his policies, both nationally and internationally, and he was briefly seconded to the Crimea in 1855, to improve sanitation in the army camps at Sebastopol. The Public Health Act 1848 (11 & 12 Vict. c. 63) was modelled on the Liverpool Sanatory Act 1846, and as a result, many towns employed a Borough Engineer, a role which Newlands had largely defined himself. His co-operation with the Medical Officer of Health was crucial to the success of Liverpool's sanitary reforms, and shortly after his death in 1871, the Association of Municipal Engineers was formed, later becoming part of the Institution of Civil Engineers. He had significantly reduced mortality in the city, and crowds lined the streets for his funeral in recognition of this.

The Liverpool Corporation area expanded in 1895 and 1913, as outlying districts were absorbed. They inherited sewage works at Walton and Fazakerley, both draining into the River Alt, and at Woolton, draining into Ditton Brook. Extra capacity at Fazakerley was created in 1913 by constructing an 8-foot (2.4 m) diameter sewer, to carry effluent through a ridge to the River Mersey.

=== Development ===
The second half of the 20th century was marked by a number of legislative attempts to address the problems of the water industry. Pollution from sewage was a particular problem, and although the concept of discharge licensing had been introduced by the Rivers (Prevention of Pollution) Act 1951 (14 & 15 Geo. 6. c. 64) and a similar act of Parliament, the Rivers (Prevention of Pollution) Act 1961 (9 & 10 Eliz. 2. c. 50), the Working Party on Sewage Disposal, which reported in 1970, concluded that there were over 3,000 sewage treatment works in England and Wales which were performing inadequately. There was little incentive to invest in sewage treatment works, and in many areas the rapid increases in population had resulted in rivers becoming grossly polluted. Pollution of the Mersey estuary was particularly bad, with raw sewage from a population of around one million emanating from Liverpool and from Birkenhead on the opposite bank of the Mersey entering the river, supplemented by industrial discharges from Runcorn and Widnes. In 1971 a Steering Committee on Pollution of the Mersey Estuary was set up, to which consulting engineers reported in 1974 on possible sites for sewage treatment works.

The Water Act 1973 (c. 37) had focused on providing a single unifying body with responsibility for all water-related function within a river basin or series of river basins. It established ten regional water authorities, which would have responsibility for water supply, sewage treatment, and river quality. In Liverpool's case, the functions of water supply and sewerage passed to the North West Water Authority, although only the main sewers, treatment works and outfalls were covered by the legislation, so the smaller sewers remained the city's responsibility. There were issues with the new structures, as a single authority responsible for river quality and sewage treatment was unlikely to prosecute itself for breaches in quality. It also became obvious that the industry suffered from ageing infrastructure and chronic under-investment. The Conservative Party of the time saw privatisation as a means to solve the funding gap, and under the terms of the Water Act 1989 (c. 15), the North West Water Authority became North West Water plc, a water and sewerage company, with the river quality functions passing to the National Rivers Authority. North West Water merged with Norweb in 1995 to become United Utilities.

By 1982, there were 48 outfall sewers pouring raw sewage into the Mersey from Liverpool, Sefton and Wirral. Consideration had been given to creating a new island between Eastham and Garston, as finding land near the river front on which to build a wastewater treatment works was proving difficult, but the chosen solution was to route an outfall through Alexandra Dock. While plans were being drawn up, Sandon Dock became available, and became the site for the new works, which Newlands had suggested was needed in 1848. It had the advantage that building an interceptor sewer to link the outfalls to the works would be relatively simple, the treated effluent could still be routed into the estuary, and sludge could be taken to sea for dumping. Planning permission to construct the works was granted in 1980, Although surveys suggested that an outfall pipe some 980 to 1,310 feet (300 to 400 m) long would be required, to discharge the effluent into water 33 feet (10 m) below the low tide level, it was initially discharged over the dock wall as the site became operational between April and June 1991. By October 1992, 6 of the 28 outfalls in Liverpool had been linked to the works, and a hydrological survey showed that the outfall pipe was required. Dumping of sludge at sea ceased in 1998, as a result of the adoption of the Urban Waste Water Treatment Directive. The works was extended in 2016, by building additional facilities in the adjacent Wellington Dock as part of a £200 million upgrade. Both the original works and the new facilities were formally opened by Princess Anne.

The Rivington reservoirs are still supplying drinking water, although Hawksley's sand filters were replaced by a new £38.9-million water treatment works in 1994, which was opened by Michael Heseltine. It treats 17.6 million imperial gallons (80 Ml) per day, but the water now supplies the Wigan area rather than Liverpool. There are a number of websites that state that High Bullough Reservoir is no longer used to supply drinking water, but the reservoir was still contained in a list of reservoirs in the Rivington Chain when United Utilities issued an application for a drought permit to reduce compensation flows to the River Yarrow in mid-2018.

== Bibliography ==
- Binnie, G M (1981). Early Victorian Water Engineers. Thomas Telford. ISBN 978-0-7277-0128-2.
- Cross-Rudkin, Peter; Chrimes, Mike (2008). A Biographical Dictionary of Civil Engineers in Great Britain and Ireland: Vol 2: 1830 to 1890. Thomas Telford. ISBN 978-0-7277-3504-1.
- Duncan, T (1853). The Civil Engineer and Architects Journal. Vol. XVI. R Groombridge & Sons.
- NRA (1993). "Sandon dock wastewater treatment works : outfall survey October 1992" (PDF). National Rivers Authority North West Region. Archived (PDF) from the original on 15 September 2018.
- Ofwat (2006). "The Development of the Water Industry in England and Wales" (PDF). OFWAT. Archived from the original (PDF) on 4 June 2015.
- Olsen, G N (June 1997). "Liverpool's drainage history: seventeenth century to MEPAS" (PDF). Proceedings of the Institution of Civil Engineers - Municipal Engineer. 121 (2): 67–77. doi:10.1680/imuen.1997.29487. Archived (PDF) from the original on 17 September 2018.
- Porter, Elizabeth (1978). Water Management in England and Wales. Cambridge University Press. ISBN 978-0-521-21865-8.
- Sheard, Sally (1993). Water and Health: The formation and exploitation of the relationship in Liverpool 1847 to 1900 (PDF). Vol. 143. Historic Society of Lancashire and Cheshire. Archived (PDF) from the original on 12 September 2018.
- Sheard, Sally (31 July 2014). James Newlands and the origins of the municipal engineer (PDF). Institute of Civil Engineers. Archived (PDF) from the original on 12 September 2018.
- Skempton, Sir Alec; et al. (2002). A Biographical Dictionary of Civil Engineers in Great Britain and Ireland: Vol 1: 1500 to 1830. Thomas Telford. ISBN 978-0-7277-2939-2.
- Weston, Alan (5 April 2016). "Inside the £200m plant which is helping bring dolphins back to the Mersey". Liverpool Echo. Archived from the original on 17 January 2018.
