= The Goit =

Canal in Lancashire, England

Coordinates: 53.670°N 2.575°W

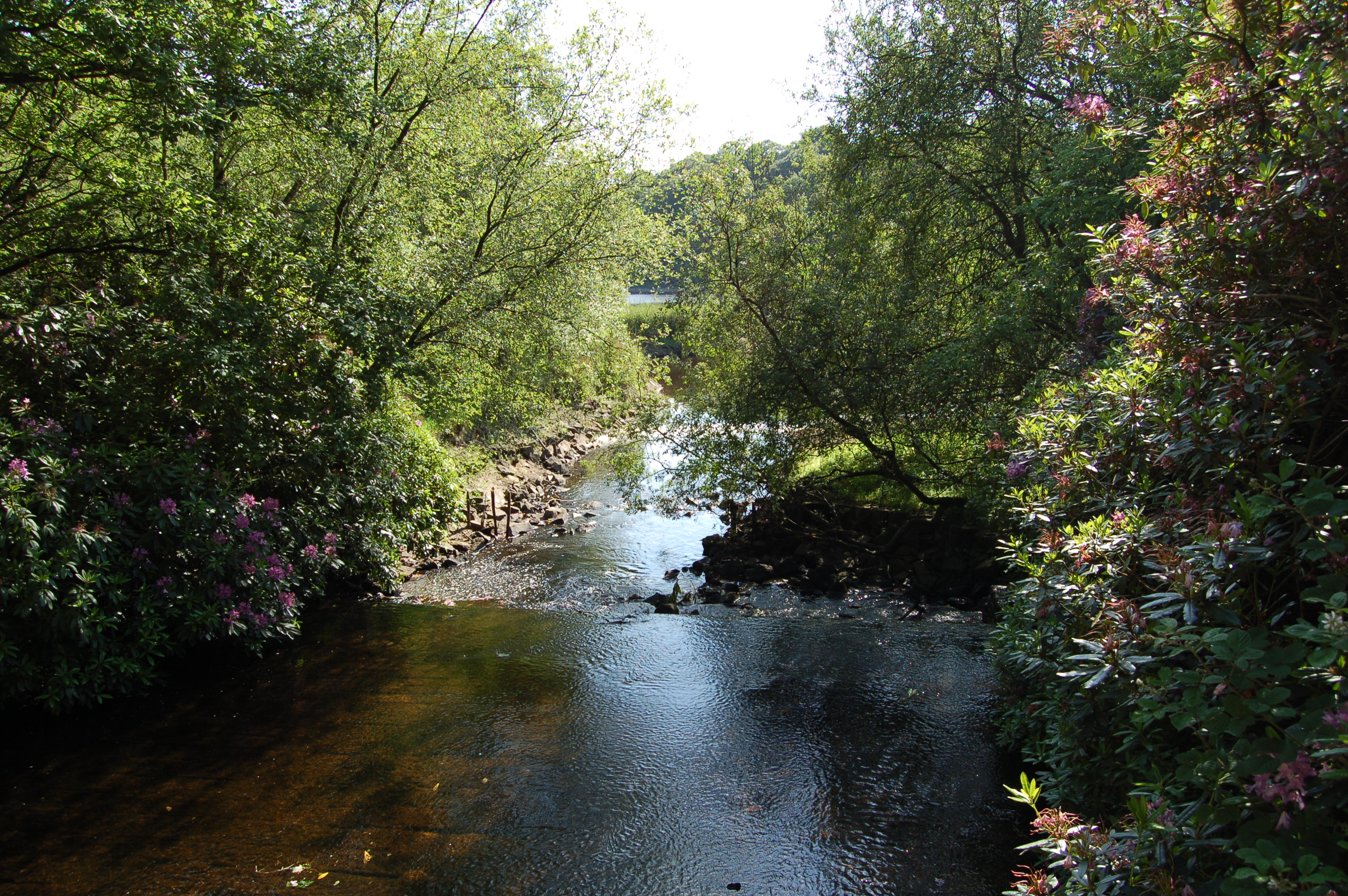
The end of The Goit at Anglezarke reservoir

The Goit (sometimes written The Goyt) (see Oxford English Dictionary - Gote - a watercourse; any channel for water; a stream. Chiefly northern dialect.) is a canal used for transporting drinking water along the Rivington chain in Lancashire, England. The section in Brinscall is currently covered, and a local campaign is ongoing to attempt to uncover the water. The Goit is now uncovered from Brinscall down to Anglezarke, passing through White Coppice, a path follows its course the whole way on either side.

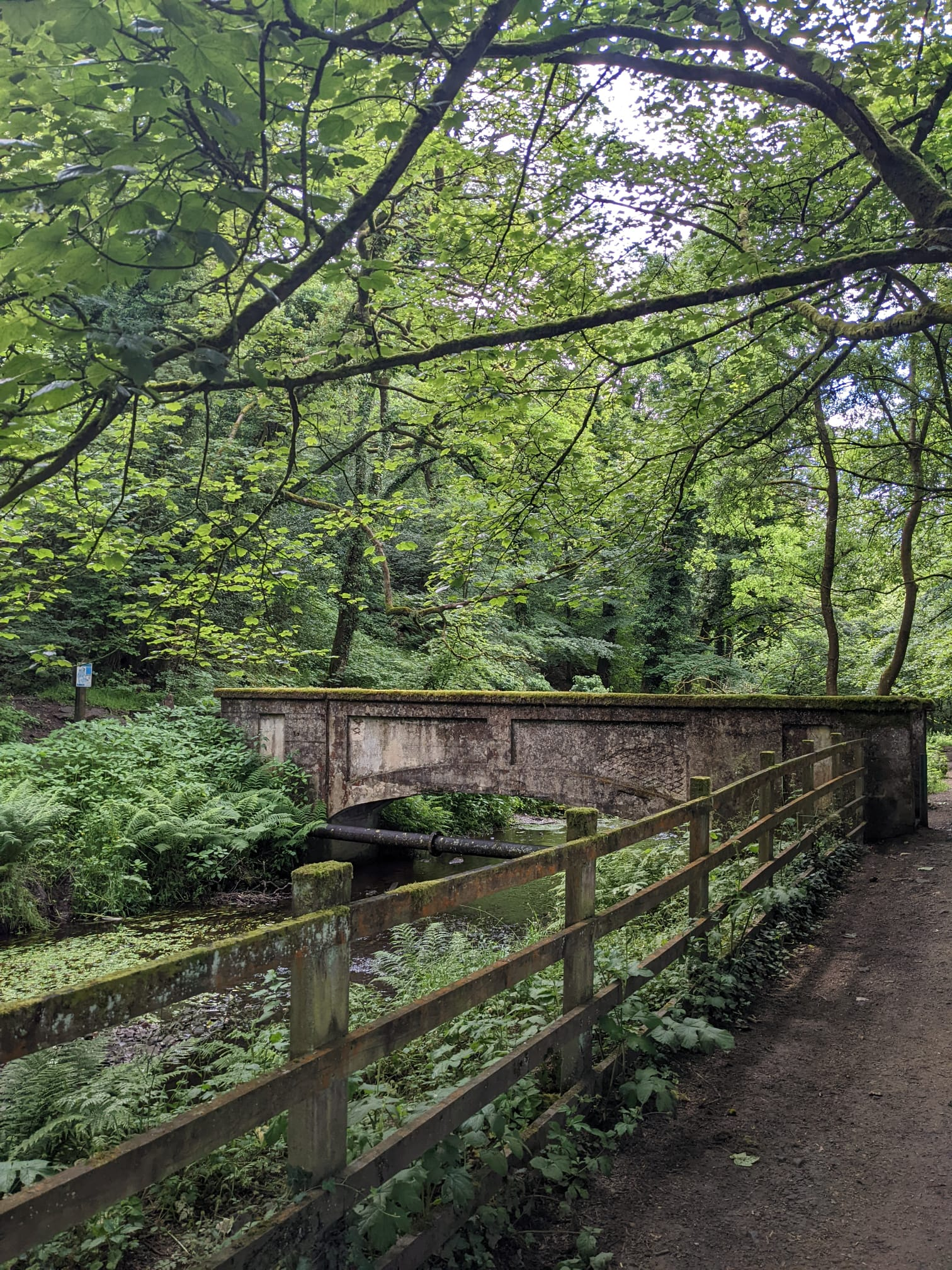
A stone bridge grossing the River Goit between Brinscall and White Coppice, Lancashire.
