= Listed buildings in Withnell =

Withnell is a civil parish in the Borough of Chorley, Lancashire, England. It contains 20 buildings that are recorded in the National Heritage List for England as designated listed buildings, all of which are listed at Grade II. This grade is the lowest of the three gradings given to listed buildings and is applied to "buildings of national importance and special interest". Apart from the village of Withnell, the parish is mainly rural. Many of the listed buildings are, or originated as, farmhouses or farm buildings. The Leeds and Liverpool Canal runs through the parish, and six of the bridges crossing it are listed. The other listed buildings include cottages, large houses, a war memorial and a set of stocks.

== Buildings ==
Name and location	Photograph	Date	Notes
Close House; 53.70448°N 2.55142°W	—	1638	The former farmhouse is in sandstone with roofs partly slated and partly in stone-slate, and has two storeys. It has an L-shaped plan with a two-bay main range and a two-bay wing at the rear. On the front is a wide two-storey porch and stair turret. The windows were originally mullioned, but have been altered and most mullions have been lost. Inside is an inglenook, a bressumer, and a timber-framed partition.
Stanworth Farmhouse; 53.71468°N 2.54506°W	—	17th century	A sandstone farmhouse, mostly rendered, with a slate roof, in two storeys. It has an L-shaped plan, consisting of a main three-bay range, and a long two-bay wing. Some mullioned windows have been retained, and others have been altered. Inside is a timber-framed partition.
Higher Close House Farmhouse; 53.70510°N 2.55224°W	—	Late 17th century (probable)	The former farmhouse was extended in the early 18th century. It is in sandstone, partly rendered, with a tiled roof, and has two storeys. The farmhouse has an L-shaped plan, the original part in three bays, with a wing added to the front of the third bay, and lean-to porch in the angle. Most of the windows have been altered, but some mullions remain.
Laund Fold Farmhouse; 53.71228°N 2.57233°W	—	Late 17th century (probable)	The farmhouse is in sandstone, and is mostly roughcast, with a stone-slate roof. It has two storeys, and a three-bay front with a two-storey gabled porch. Some of the windows are mullioned, and others are sashes.
Brimmicroft Farmhouse; 53.71704°N 2.56900°W	—	1710	The former farmhouse is in sandstone with s stone-slate roof. It has two storeys and three bays with an outshut at the rear. On the front is a wide two-storey gabled porch with a doorway over which is a shaped inscribed lintel. The windows have concrete surrounds and mullions imitating 17th-century windows. Inside there is said to be an inglenook and a bressumer.
Withnell Fold Farmhouse, dairy and barn 53.70314°N 2.58673°W	—	1736	The farmhouse is in sandstone with a slate roof, it is in two storeys and two-bays. Above the doorway is an inscribed lintel. To the left, and projecting forward, is a one-bay two-storey dairy, and beyond that is a barn containing a datestone.
Brimmicroft Cottage; 53.71793°N 2.56932°W	—	Mid 18th century	The cottage contains the remains of an earlier building. It is in sandstone with a stone-slate roof, and has two storeys and two bays. The windows in the ground floor are mullioned, and those above are sliding sashes. There are extensions on both sides of the cottage.
Stocks; 53.70277°N 2.58902°W		18th century (probable)	The stocks consist of two stone pillars about 1 metre (3 ft 3 in) high between which are restored wooden beams with two holes for legs. Behind this is a seat between two short round-headed stone posts.
Ivy Cottage; 53.71069°N 2.56430°W	—	Late 18th century	A sandstone cottage with a slate roof, and an integral loomshop. It has two storeys and a two-bay front with a wooden porch. To the left of this is a five-light mullioned window, to the right is a large horizontal window, and in the upper floor are casements.
Stony Flat Bridge; 53.70019°N 2.59520°W		1811–16	This is Bridge No. 87, an accommodation bridge over the Leeds and Liverpool Canal. It is in sandstone and consists of a single distorted elliptical arch with a sloped deck. The bridge has rusticated voussoirs and keystones, a parapet with rounded coping, and pilastered ends.
Withnell Fold Bridge; 53.70365°N 2.59109°W		1811–16	This is Bridge No. 88, an accommodation bridge over the Leeds and Liverpool Canal. It is in sandstone and consists of a single elliptical arch with rusticated voussoirs, keystones, and a parapet.
Ollerton Bridge No. 3; 53.70837°N 2.58724°W		1811–16	This is Bridge No. 89, an accommodation bridge over the Leeds and Liverpool Canal. It is in sandstone and consists of a single elliptical arch with rusticated voussoirs, keystones, a parapet, and pilastered ends.
Ollerton Bridge No. 2; 53.71188°N 2.58325°W		1811–16	This is Bridge No. 90, an accommodation bridge over the Leeds and Liverpool Canal. It is in sandstone and consists of a single elliptical arch with a humped deck. The bridge has rusticated voussoirs, keystones, and a parapet.
Ollerton Bridge No. 1; 53.71357°N 2.58119°W		1811–16	This is Bridge No. 91, an accommodation bridge over the Leeds and Liverpool Canal. It is in sandstone and consists of a single elliptical arch with a humped deck. The bridge has rusticated voussoirs, keystones, and a parapet.
Millfield Bridge; 53.71847°N 2.55096°W		1811–16	This is Bridge No. 93, an accommodation bridge over the Leeds and Liverpool Canal. It is in sandstone and consists of a single elliptical arch with a humped deck. The bridge has rusticated voussoirs, keystones, a parapet with ridge coping, and pilastered ends.
Abbey Mill; 53.6980°N 2.5459°W		Before 1840	An integrated cotton spinning and weaving mill, subsequently altered and extended. It is built in sandstone with some brick, and has a slate roof, partly glazed. It consists of a spinning block with four storeys and attics, a front of twelve bays, and containing an engine house, a small preparation block with a stair tower, a single-storey weaving shed with eleven bays, a two-storey warehouse and a boiler house, a reservoir to the south, a three-storey gatehouse block, a two-storey office block, and a single-storey cottage.
Ollerton Hall; 53.70639°N 2.57754°W	—	1840	A large stone house with a hipped slate roof in Classical style. It has two storeys, and a square plan with three bays on each side, and a service wing to the east. On the entrance front is a porch with four Doric columns, a plain entablature with a cornice, and a door with a fanlight. Elsewhere there are pilasters, and the windows are sashes. On the left side are two canted bay windows.
Withnell Fold Hall; 53.70384°N 2.58458°W	—	1898–99	Originally a country house, later used for other purposes, it is in Accrington brick with sandstone dressings, a red tiled roof, and some applied timber-framing. It has 2 1/2 storeys, and an irregular plan, with a five-bay main front. On the front is a three-storey embattled porch with a domed stair turret. Other features include an oriel window, mullioned windows, and an octagonal lantern with a domed copper roof.
War Memorial to Private James Miller VC; 53.69679°N 2.55962°W		1917	The war memorial is in the churchyard of St Paul's Church, and commemorates James Miller who was killed in action in 1916 in the First World War. It is in white Cornish granite, and consists of a wheel head Celtic cross on a tapering shaft and a tapering plinth, and is about 2 metres (6 ft 7 in) tall. The cross head has interlace decoration and a central boss. On the shaft is an inscription, and at the top is a life-size replica of the Victoria Cross in bronze. On the plinth is an inscription describing the events that led to Miller's death.
Cottage near Brimmicroft Cottage; 53.71801°N 2.56908°W	—	Undated	A sandstone cottage with a stone-slate roof, in two storeys and two bays. Most of the windows are mullioned.
