= Brinscall =

Village in Lancashire, England

Coordinates: 53.688°N 2.569°W

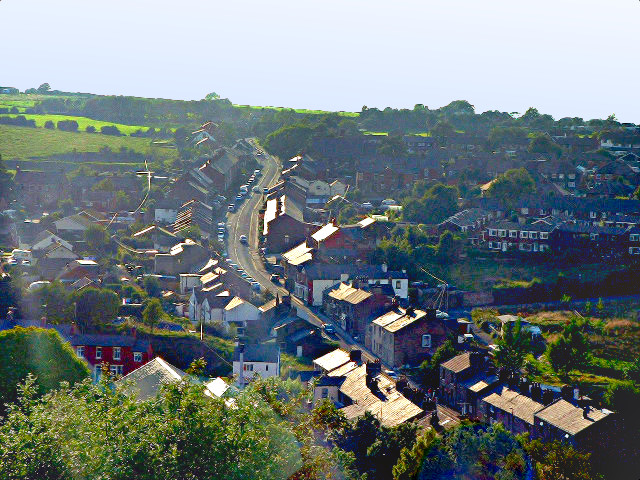
- Brinscall viewed from "Brinsky Woods"

- Shown within Chorley Borough Location within Lancashire
- Population: 1,431
- OS grid reference: SD625215
- Civil parish: Withnell
- District: Chorley
- Shire county: Lancashire
- Region: North West
- Country: England
- Sovereign state: United Kingdom
- Post town: CHORLEY
- Postcode district: PR6
- Dialling code: 01254
- Police: Lancashire
- Fire: Lancashire
- Ambulance: North West
- UK Parliament: Chorley

Brinscall is a village in the Borough of Chorley, Lancashire, England. Located approximately five miles north-east of Chorley, Brinscall borders the similar-sized villages of Withnell and Abbey Village. Brinscall is part of the civil parish of Withnell but does not have its own boundaries. However, an area used in the 2001 census that covers approximately the same area as the village had a population of 1,431. The village population at the 2011 census was 1,388.

== Toponymy ==
A number of origins of the name ‘Brinscall' have been suggested. Local legend has it a sheepdog named Brin had a habit of 'calling' or howling from this place, supposedly for his recently deceased master, who hanged himself from a tree at nearby Withnell.

The master, a local young farmer, had become deeply morose after his childhood sweetheart, a milkmaid named Nell, died whilst giving birth to the child of the son of a local landowner, named Hollinshead. On hearing the farmer leave the house late at night, his mother asked him where he was going, to which he replied, "To be with Nell".

The oft used "burnt huts" as an origin name seems unlikely as no further info exists for this. It seems a more likely origin for the village or area name could be Windy Ridge — or in Olde English Bryn (ridge) Skaal (windy). The monks of Whalley Abbey used Harbour Lane above the village to go to their "Arbor" at Monks Hill, just off Harbour Lane, and would look across the hills overlooking the land where Brinscall now lies and the farmsteads on the "Windy Ridge" — Bryne Skall.

== History ==
The village was originally a small farming community, but in the 19th century, the thriving cotton industry moved in. There is also a quarry nearby, and Brinscall housed many of its workers.

The village also lends its name to an important geological feature, the Brinscall Fault, which is orientated approximately north-south and borders the western edge of Anglezarke moor.

== Amenities ==
Amenities in Brinscall include:

- A small swimming pool, opened in 1911
- A joint Church of England and Methodist primary school (Brinscall St John's C. E. Methodist Primary School)
- A Church of England church (St. Luke's) soon to be demolished
- A Methodist church (Hillside)
- A small post office
- Croft Lodge, a pond popular with local anglers
- An athletic club with tennis courts, bowling green, cricket and football pitches
- Children's play area

A nature trail goes through Brinscall and many of the bordering villages. There is a large wood named by villagers 'Brinsky Woods'.

In April 2012 the BBC programme Countryfile featured the story of the lost farms of Brinscall moor, numbering about 50. The tenant farmers were encouraged to move out when the land was acquired under compulsory purchase order, in 1902, by the Liverpool Corporation Waterworks, which needed to secure a source of pure drinking water. The corporation proceeded to plant trees across large areas of land on the moor. This deliberate afforestation effectively removed the pasture for the farms' sheep grazing and by the 1930s all the farms had been deserted.

With its proximity to the West Pennine Moors access land area, residents of Brinscall enjoy hiking, cycling and running routes. The popular cycling event the Chorley Grand Prix passes through Brinscall, and a fell running event, Great Hill Fell Race, is held annually in this area.

Brinscall also has a small village football team called Brinscall Village which competes in a local footballing league with several other clubs from the area.

In 2018, the nearby Brinscall Quarry was discovered to have the specific type of stone needed to complete the Basilica de la Sagrada Familia in Barcelona, Spain, after discovering that the usual place for mining the stone, the Montserrat mountain was beginning to become more fragile the deeper they quarried.
