= Rivington Water Treatment Works =

Coordinates: 53.6056°N 2.5991°W

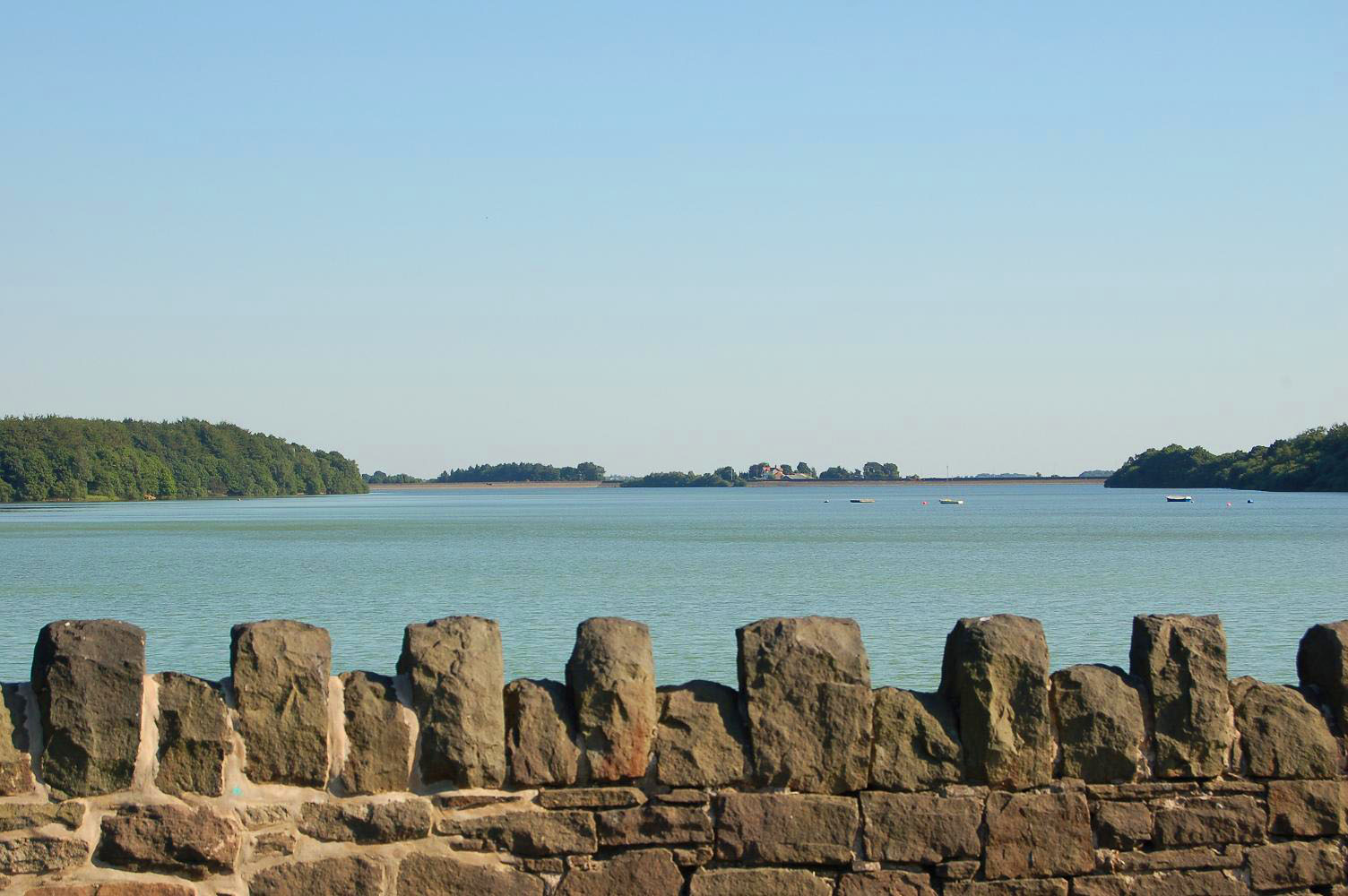
Lower Rivington Reservoir

Rivington Water Treatment Works is a water treatment plant in Rivington, Lancashire, England. It is located below the Lower Rivington Reservoir, the last in the Rivington chain of reservoirs. The first treatment works, a slow-sand filter plant on the site opened in 1860, supplying water to Liverpool. The present works was built in 1994, and in 2007 was the largest automated three-stage plant operated by United Utilities, the water is now disinfected by adding small amounts of chlorine. Most of its output supplies customers in the Wigan area.

Raw water from the Rivington chain of reservoirs can be supplied to the Thirlmere Aqueduct via a pipeline downstream of the Lower Rivington Reservoir embankment and treated water via a pumping main and the Treated Water Pumping Station on the Rivington Water Treatment Works site..
