= Anglezarke Reservoir =

Reservoir in Lancashire, England

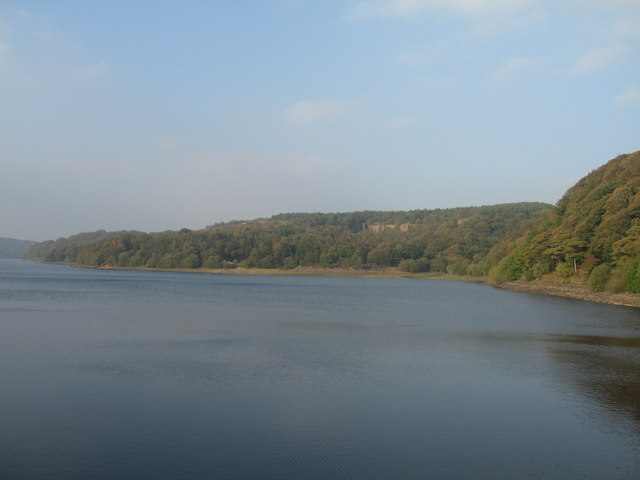
- Anglezarke Reservoir, Rivington

- Shown within Chorley Borough
- Location: Rivington
- Coordinates: 53°38′30″N 2°35′0″W
- Type: Reservoir
- Primary inflows: River Yarrow
- Primary outflows: The Goit
- Basin countries: United Kingdom
- Settlements: Chorley, Lancashire

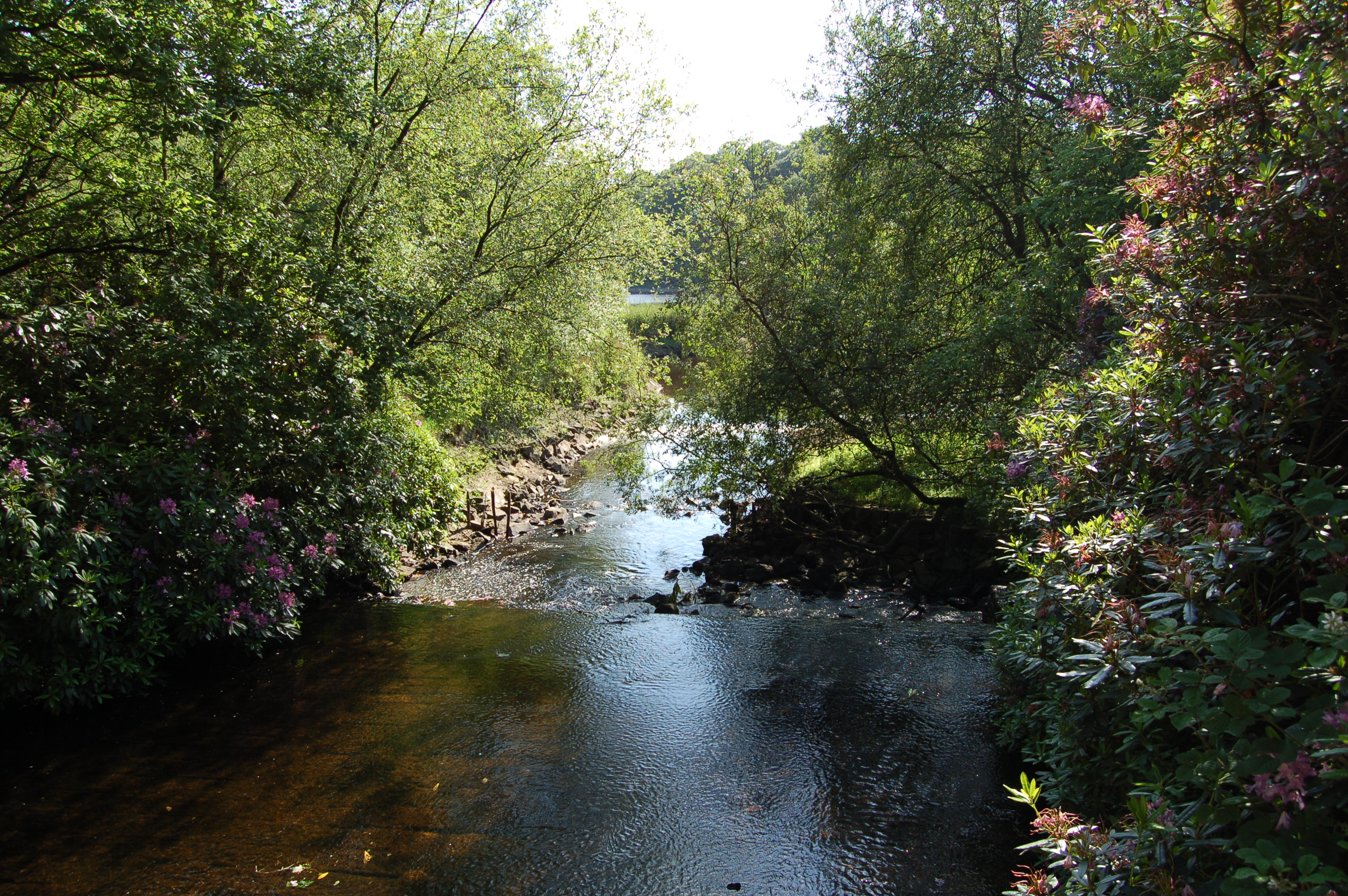
The Goit, discharging into the Northern end of the reservoir

Anglezarke Reservoir is the largest reservoir in the Rivington chain to the west of Anglezarke in Lancashire, England. Anglezarke Reservoir has three embankments: the Charnock Embankment, the longest, is 850 yards (777 m) long and 31 feet (9.45 m) high, the Knowsley Embankment is 240 yards (219.5 m) long and 45 feet (14 m) high and the Heapey Embankment is 280 feet (85.3 m) long and 32 feet (9.75 m) high. It is fed by the River Yarrow, which has been diverted from its original course which is now covered by the Knowsley Embankment. It served the city of Liverpool before its current status as a supply mainly for Wigan. The original `Rivington Pike Scheme' was undertaken by Thomas Hawksley between 1850 and 1857 for the Liverpool Corporation Waterworks. The scheme was to construct five reservoirs and a water treatment works at the south end of Lower Rivington with a 17-mile (27 km) pipeline to storage reservoirs at Prescot. Water from two higher level reservoirs, Rake Brook and Lower Roddlesworth, was carried south in `The Goit', a channel connecting them to the reservoirs.

In November 1997, the reservoir was refilled after the 1997 summer heat wave. The water flow was so large that the reservoir required an emergency draw-down. With the water level at a temporary low, there was an opportunity to inspect the Heapey embankment on Moor Road, which had been leaking since the 1960s. The condition of the embankment and surrounding strata were such that a phased grouting operation was required to remedy the leakage. The reservoir was refilled, but was still leaking. After a second grouting and refill operation, the embankment was deemed leak-free.

It appears that the original cause of the leak was an 18-inch cast iron draw-off pipe which supplied White Brook to the north of the embankment. The trench for the pipe was cut much deeper than needed, through a glacial meltwater channel. However, shutting the pipe off in the 1970s failed to remedy the situation.

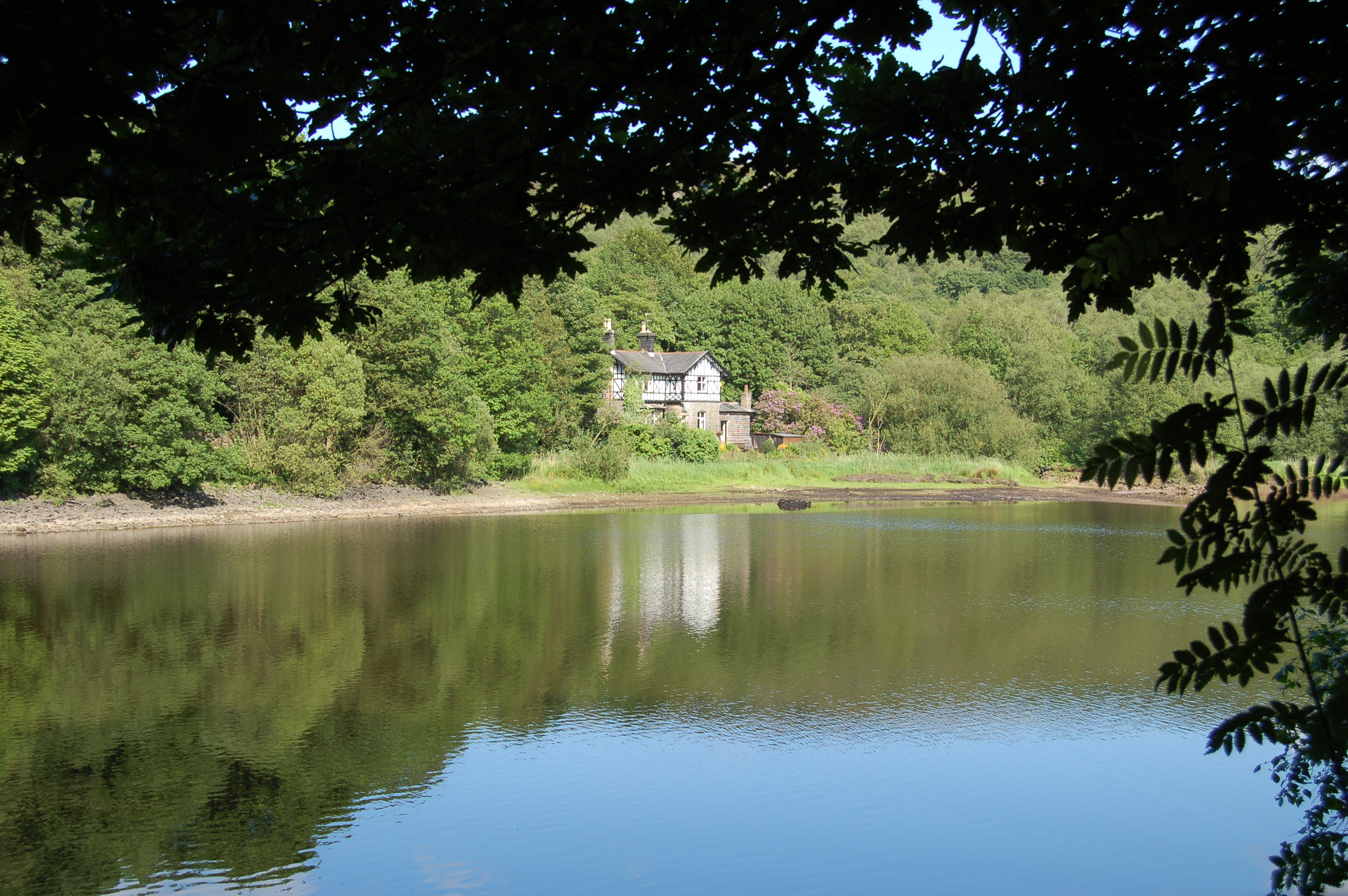
Waterman's Cottage, built by the Liverpool Corporation Waterworks Authority from local stone

Waterman's Cottage was built by Liverpool Corporation on the west bank of the reservoir. The cottage is a Tudor-style structure also known as Heapey Cottage. It was occupied by Denis and Anne Oakden in the 1940s. Denis worked for the Water Authority and moved to the property after several years in Porch Cottages, White Coppice.

To the east of the reservoir is the small High Bullough reservoir and the Anglezarke Moors, Upper Rivington Reservoir is to the south and Healey Nab to the north-west. The area is now a wildlife haven, with a Woodland Trail which links to High Bullough reservoir.
