= Abbey Village =

Village in Lancashire, England

Coordinates: 53.697°N 2.539°W

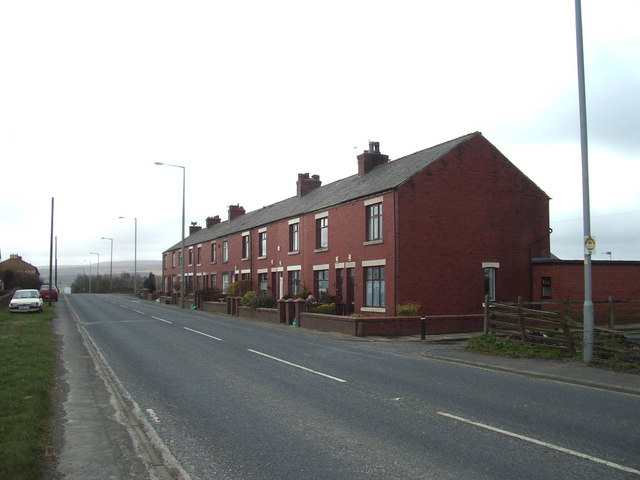
- Terraced houses just outside Abbey Village

- Shown within Chorley Borough Location within Lancashire
- OS grid reference: SD645225
- Civil parish: Withnell
- District: Chorley
- Shire county: Lancashire
- Region: North West
- Country: England
- Sovereign state: United Kingdom
- Post town: CHORLEY
- Postcode district: PR6
- Dialling code: 01254
- Police: Lancashire
- Fire: Lancashire
- Ambulance: North West
- UK Parliament: Chorley

Abbey Village is a village in the English county of Lancashire and the constituency of Chorley. It is located on the A675 road, six miles (9.7 km) from Blackburn, eight miles (13 km) from Chorley, nine miles (14 km) from Preston and ten miles from Bolton.

== Toponymy ==
The name is believed to have arisen from a connection with Whalley Abbey, as the village is located close to a track between the abbey and Brinscall Hall.

== Community ==
The village is generally ribbon in layout lying along the A675. It is centred on a now redundant cotton mill which is broken down into industrial units. It has a number of amenities including a pub to the south of the village and an Indian restaurant to the north, which has now closed. There is also a driving school that operates from the area, aptly named Abbey driver training.

== Education ==
The village has a primary school, Abbey Village County Primary School, with most pupils going on to high schools in Chorley.

== Geography ==
The village is near the Upper and Lower Roddlesworth Reservoirs as well as the West Pennine Moors.

== Public transport ==
The village was formerly served by Withnell railway station but that closed in 1960.

Public transport now consists solely of the No. 2 bus service between Blackburn and Chorley. From Monday to Saturday Blackburn Bus Company operates the service Every hour throughout the day. In the evenings and on Sundays, Stagecoach Merseyside & South Lancashire runs an hourly service, finishing shortly before midnight.
