= Withnell =

Village in Lancashire, England

Coordinates: 53.690°N 2.555°W

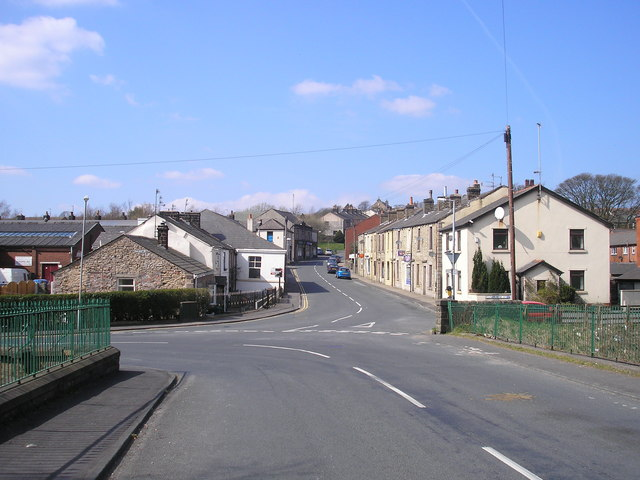
- Bury Lane, Withnell village centre

- Shown within Chorley Borough Location within Lancashire
- Population: 3,498 (2011 census)
- OS grid reference: SD634217
- Civil parish: Withnell
- District: Chorley
- Shire county: Lancashire
- Region: North West
- Country: England
- Sovereign state: United Kingdom
- Post town: CHORLEY
- Postcode district: PR6
- Dialling code: 01254
- Police: Lancashire
- Fire: Lancashire
- Ambulance: North West
- UK Parliament: Chorley

Withnell is a village and civil parish in the Borough of Chorley, Lancashire, England. According to the census of 2001, it had a population of 3,631, reducing to 3,498 at the census of 2011. Withnell is about 5 miles (8 km) north-east of Chorley itself and about 5 miles (8 km) from Blackburn. It borders the villages of Brinscall and Abbey Village, which are part of the parish. It constituted an urban district from 1894 to 1974.

== Toponymy ==
The name Withnell is first recorded as Withinhull around 1160, and appears as Withinhulle in the 1332 Subsidy Rolls of Lancashire. It means 'hill where willow trees grow'.

== Amenities ==
St. Joseph's Catholic church in Withnell has a primary school. St Paul's Church of England parish church was built in 1841. It has a 1917 war memorial cross commemorating First World War Pte James Miller, who was posthumously awarded the Victoria Cross after delivering a message and returning with the reply despite being shot in the back. The memorial was Grade II listed in 2024.

There was formerly a post office, closed on 8 May 2008 as part of the Post Office Network Change Program. A newsagent continued to operate from the old post office premises, but closed a couple of years later and the building became a private house.

Withnell Health Centre is a GP surgery serving Withnell and surrounding villages. There is also a pharmacy, a beauty parlour and a car sales garage.

Withnell railway station served the village, but it closed in 1960.

== Environs ==
Withnell Local Nature Reserve, designated by Chorley Borough Council, roughly traces the path of a now disused railway cutting for around 600 yards (550 m). Since 1966, a large number of wildflowers, native trees and heathers have been planted in the 12-acre (4.9 ha) site. The public are free to walk through the reserve.

In 2018, the type of stone needed for the completion of the Basilica de la Sagrada Familia in Barcelona was discovered in Brinscall Quarry near Withnell.

== See also ==
Listed buildings in Withnell
