= Upper Rivington Reservoir =

Reservoir in Lancashire, England

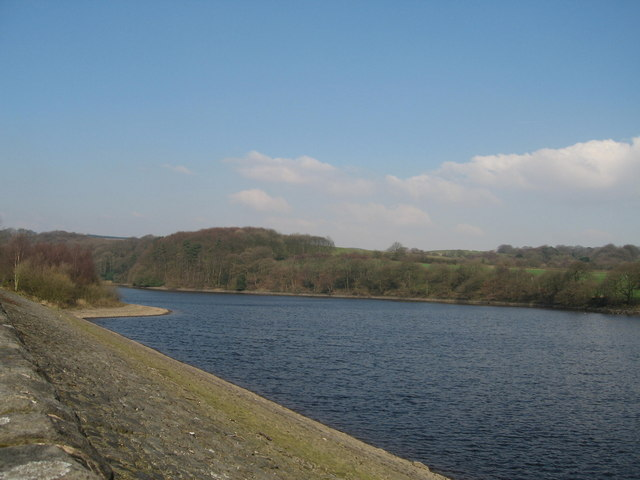
- Upper Rivington Reservoir

- Shown within Chorley Borough
- Location: Lancashire, England
- Coordinates: 53°37′44″N 2°34′24″W
- Type: reservoir
- Basin countries: United Kingdom

Upper Rivington Reservoir is situated centrally in the Rivington chain of reservoirs, on the West Pennine Moors in Lancashire, England, between Rivington and Anglezarke. The engineer for the Rivington reservoirs was Thomas Hawksley and construction for Liverpool Corporation Waterworks took place between 1852 and 1857. The two dams of the Upper Rivington reservoir are the 292-yard (267 m) Horrobin Embankment that separates it from the lower reservoir and carries a road into the village from the west, and the 292-yard (267 m) long, 40 foot (12.2 m) high Yarrow Embankment.

There is an island. A bridleway and residence, The Street are on the side of the reservoir. It is a popular walking destination, between Anglezarke Reservoir to the north, Lower Rivington Reservoir to the south, and Yarrow reservoir to the east.

Street Bottoms and Street Wood were lost with the formation of the reservoir.
