= Lower Rivington Reservoir =

Reservoir in Lancashire, England

- Shown within Chorley Borough

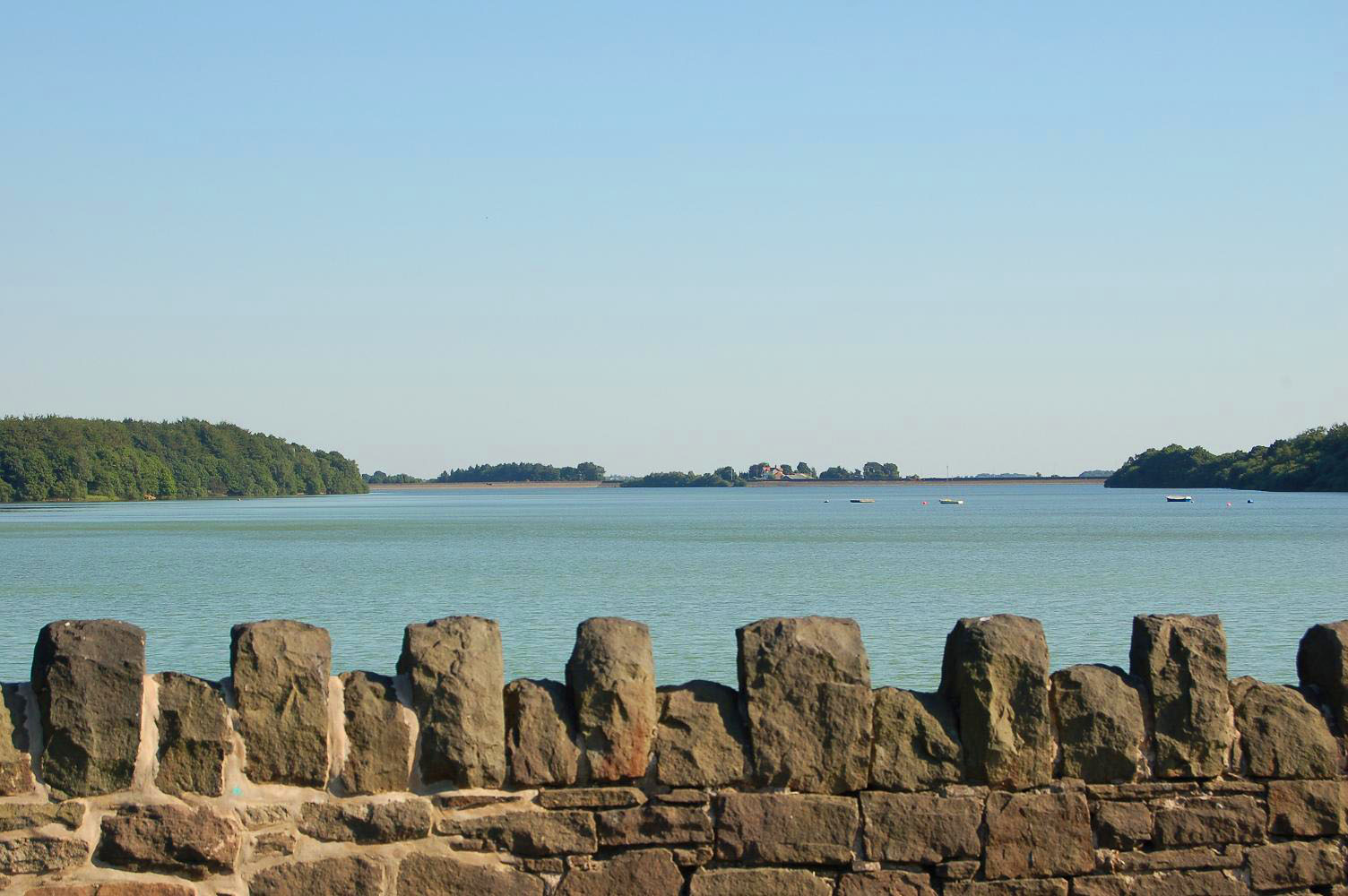
- Lower Rivington Reservoir
- Coordinates: 53°36′57″N 2°34′2″W
- Type: reservoir
- Basin countries: United Kingdom

Lower Rivington Reservoir is at the end of the Rivington chain of reservoirs in Lancashire, England, with Upper Rivington Reservoir to the north, and Rivington Water Treatment Works to the south. The Rivington chain primarily supplies 70,000 households in the Wigan area. The chain was built to supply Liverpool.

The engineer for the Rivington reservoirs was Thomas Hawksley and construction for the Liverpool Corporation Waterworks took place between 1852 and 1857. The Lower Rivington reservoir has two dams – the Millstone Embankment, which is 2,120 feet (646 m) long and 40-foot (12.2 m) high, and the Horwich Embankment, which is 1,660 feet (506 m) long and 61-foot (18.6 m) high. Filter beds were constructed at the foot of the Horwich Embankment, The original sand filters were replaced by a new treatment plant from where a pipeline runs to the service reservoirs at Eccleston, St Helens. The River Douglas was diverted through a paved channel in a deep cutting into Lower Rivington.

On the Rivington bank of the reservoir is a folly which is a replica of Liverpool Castle, and to the south-west is the Headless Cross at Grimeford Village. There is an activity centre offering watersports and land-based activities on the Anderton bank of the reservoir.
