= Manor of Rivington =

The Manor of Rivington at Rivington in Lancashire, England was the past feudal means of control over land with manorial rights above and below ground. The manor history commences 1212 when the Pilkington family owned six oxgangs of land. Records are within a book Leverhulme sponsored, authored by William Fergusson Irvine using the same sources as an earlier work by Harland, the antiquarian who had inspected the Rivington Deeds and Documents, at Rivingon Hall in 1864. The manor was divided in moieties and in the 16th century the Pilkingtons of Rivington Hall owned a 5/8 share, the Cromptons who later occupied the Hall are reputed to have sold their share to William Hesketh Lever in 1900. Lever in turn agreed compensation for the majority of his freehold at Rivington from the Liverpool water company through the Liverpool Corporation Act 1902, the act makes no mention of the manor and there is no record of any later sale of manorial rights by Leverhulme or his heirs. Other owners of shares included a quarter owned in the past by the Lathoms of Irlam and an eighth owned by the Shaw family. The manor was not voluntarily registered under the Land Registration Act 2002 and resultingly no reference is made to it in modern title deeds. There are no manorial records at the National Archive. Leverhulme was the last owner of the 5/8 share, according to a book he sponsored titled "A short history of the township of Rivington" published 1904. A local man, now deceased held the 1/8 share transferred from the Cunliffe Shaws and his records are held at Bolton archives. The 1/4 share owner is untraced. United Utilities claims that the Manor is extinguished since the Liverpool Corporation Act 1902, but the act does not support their assertion.

== Pilkington of Lancashire ==
Thomas de Rivington who held land under the Pilkingtons of Pilkington was recorded in a grant of land in 1202. Irvine, who wrote a history of the village in 1904, speculates that the Rivingtons may have been the pre-Conquest owners and were dispossessed in Norman times by the Pilkingtons, possibly by marriage. In 1212 Alexander de Pilkington held in thanage, six oxgangs of land at a rent of 10s payable to King John, and the land was divided between the sons of his uncle or stepfather. Thanage, an Anglo Saxon term, indicates the manor may predate the Domesday survey.

Rivington continued to be held by the Pilkingtons from the township of the same name until an undated document of around 1290 records that land at Rivington was passed from William De Anderton of Rumworth and Anderton as dower for his daughter Ellen on her marriage to Richard, second son of Alexander Pilkington. This added to holdings that had been bought up by Alexander and were in turn passed to his son Richard. This transfer to a junior branch saved the Rivington estate from the royal attainder after the Battle of Bosworth Field in 1485 when Sir Thomas Pilkington of the senior branch lost his estates for supporting Richard III of England. There are no records indicating the family lived at Rivington in the thirteenth century.

=== Rivington Hall ===
==== Pilkington ====
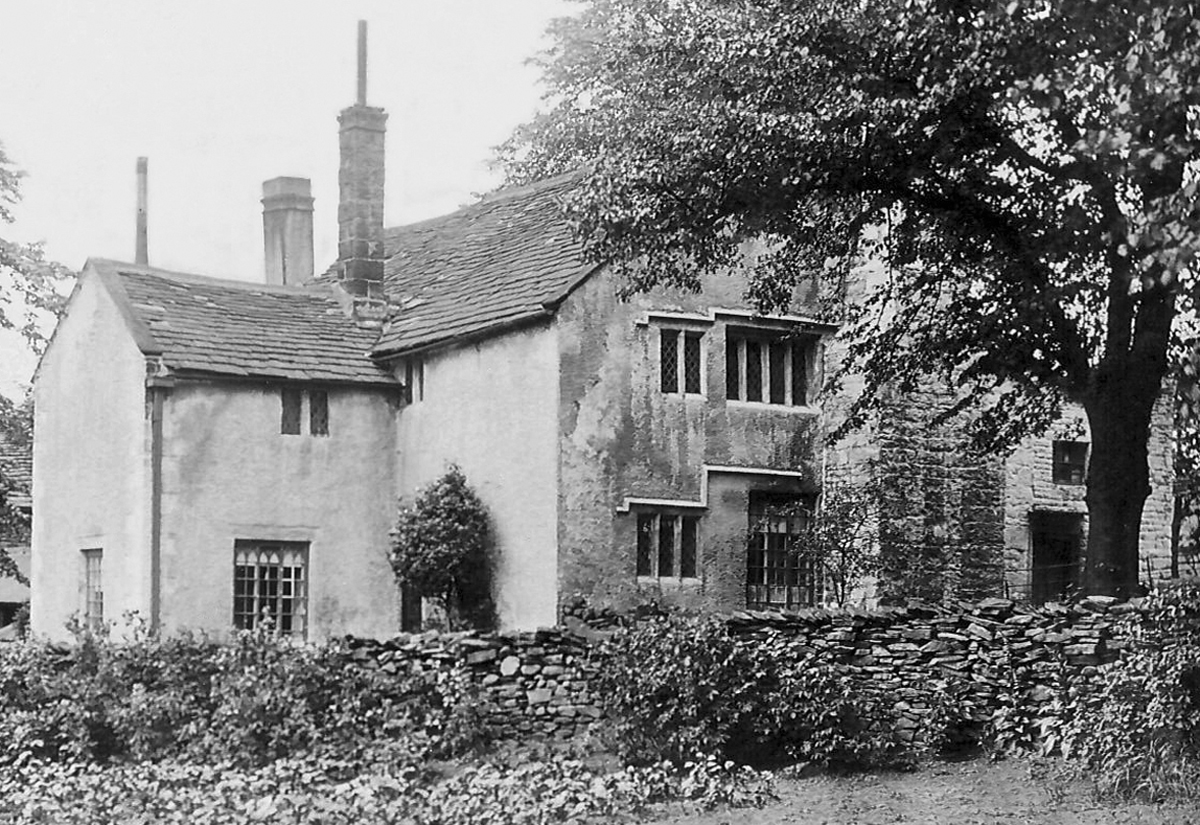
Former 'New Hall'

The Pilkingtons were the earliest owners recorded after the Rivington family. Richard died in 1312, his son, Robert, born 1296 inherited his father's estates on attaining age of majority in 1318, his eldest son Richard lived 1319 to 1382, predeceasing his father Robert who died between 1382 and 1383. Robert Pilkington is recorded on the lay subsidy at Rivington for 1327 and 1332, the name of the residence is not given. His wife was Elizabeth and his date of marriage established through a deed of 1317 in which Richard Del Knoll gave Roger land at Rivington, likely as a dowry.

In an account of the borders of Rivington, Ferneley or New Hall was mentioned in a grant from Robert Pilkington to his son, John and Joan De Heton on their marriage in 1336, New Hall is also named as a wedding gift from Dame Margaret Pilkington in 1476.

The next to inherit the Rivington Manor was Roberts grandson by Richard, also named Robert born 1339, he married Alice De Astley in 1379, this was quickly dissolved and he later married Katherine Anyesworth in 1383, he died 1403. During his life he gave evidence at the Scrope v Grosvenor Trial, at the Court of Chivalry. Robert was succeeded by his son Alexander, born 1384 and died 1474. He married Katherine del Croke of Whittle, in 1402 his father had given him lands Pye-Ridding, kylleshurst and Knoll in Rivington. He occasionally resided at Mellor, inherited from his mother Katherine. His father had transferred his estate to trust during his lifetime indicating periods of poor health. His eldest son and heir Ralph was born in 1404 and died in 1474, before his inheritance could be transferred to him, he married Margery daughter of William De Lever in 1432, and his second marriage was to Margaret sister of William Ambrose in 1447. The estate next passed to his grandson Robert, born 1451, died 1508, was to receive his inheritance on attaining age of majority in 1477. Roberts brothers were Thomas and Geoffrey, both named in deeds of 1476, Geoffrey was attorney for his elder brother and delivered seisen. He is first recorded at Rivington Hall in the same year when he contracts Adam Holden to create a cross chamber and install two great windows there on the release of his inheritance from trust, his son and heir Richard Pilkington was born 1488, his father Rogers Inquisition Post Morten was held 1512 .

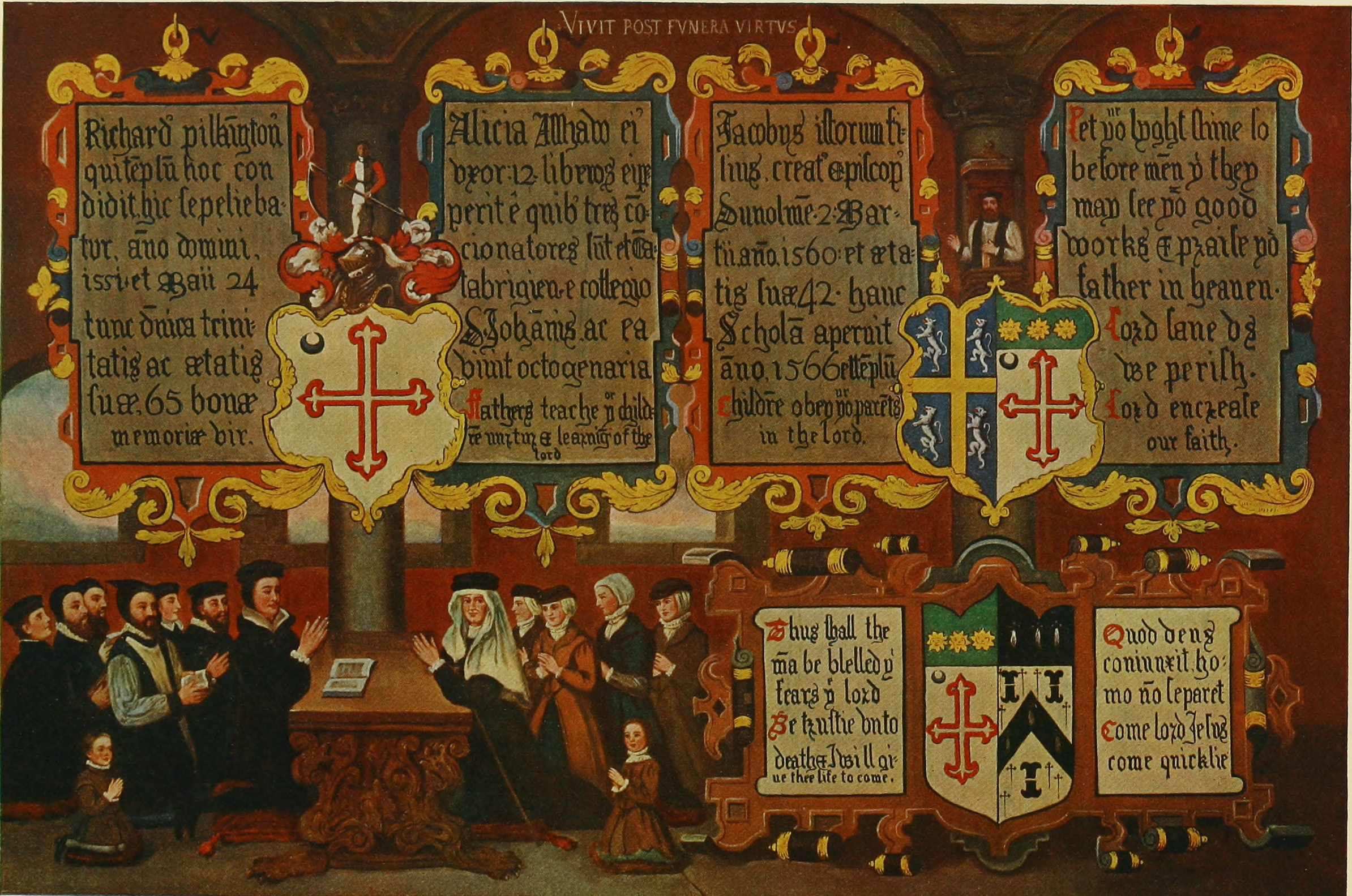
The "Pilkington Painting" at Rivington Church, Rivington, Lancashire, created 1835 as a copy of the original made in 1566 and depicts the family of Bishop James Pilkington of Rivington. The shields depict the Bishop's paternal arms, his augmented arms as bishop and the arms of Kingsmill, for his wife

Richards two eldest sons were George born 1516 and his second son born 1518 was James Pilkington, born in about 1518, the son of Richard Pilkington and Alice Asshawe. He was the first Protestant Bishop of Durham in 1560 and founded Rivington School in 1566. Robert Pilkington the bishop's grandfather died at Rivington in 1508 having been a lord of the manor for more than 30 years. The division of the manor was illustrated at the 1536 enclosure of manorial waste of 50 Cheshire acre. The three lords of the manor were Richard Pilkington, who enclosed 13 acre, James Shaw 3 acre, and George Lathom 4 acre. The Priest of Rivington Church was given 30 acre. Litigation about the manor wastes was frequent for the next eight decades. At Rivington the larger Cheshire Acre measure was used until the 20th century. There are Court Rolls of the Wapentake Court for the period 1522 to 1528 within the Duchy of Lancaster records covering Rivington.

On 1 August 1544, Richard Pilkington transferred the estate to trustees for his lifetime and bound the inheritance of his estate and rights in the manor to benefit his sons and male heirs. On the same day he gave New Hall as a wedding gift to his eldest son George who was born 1506. On the death of Richard Pilkington in 1551, the estate and Pilkington share of the manor passed to George but it was burdened by litigation arising out of the enclosure of the wastes. In 1552 George Pilkington gave New Hall to his mother, Alice, for her lifetime.

George Pilkington died in 1597 and his eldest son, Robert, inherited an estate and rights in a manor burdened by debt from litigation. Robert Pilkington's efforts to enclose the waste lands at Rivington made matters worse. By 1601 Robert had risked the estate by using it as surety for a debt of £250 to William Bispham, of London. Robert defaulted in July 1601, and Rivington and other lands passed to William Bisham until the debt was settled.

On 17 January 1604, as his fortunes declined further, Robert Pilkington agreed a 300-year lease of his share of the manor to James Anderton of Lostock, and paid his brother James to obtain his agreement. Robert Pilkington died aged 45 in November 1605 without a male heir, having made his will on the previous day. After his death there was more litigation. By the beginning of the 17th century five-eighths was held by the Pilkingtons of Rivington, a quarter by the Lathoms and an eighth by the Shaws.

===== Sale of Manor =====
After Robert Pilkington's death, at the inquisition post mortem in 1610, it was stated that, on 6 July 1601 he was seized of the Manor of Rivington held of the Duchy of Lancaster in free and common socage, a form of tenure that later became freehold. Roberts executors, Richard Hutton Serjeant at law, Thomas Tyldesley of Orford, a relation of the Breres, and Katharine Pilkington, Roberts sister, aided by Christian Anderton of Horwich settled Roberts affairs with a sale to Robert Lever and Thomas Breres, the latter two took on all Robert Pilkington's liabilities amounting to £1730. James Pilkington was not party to the 1611 sale, he was according to his grandfathers 1544 will the heir to the estate. The sale deed was signed by two executors of Robert Pilkington, Richard Hutton and Thomas Tyldesley, within the sale agreement, "except and always foreprised out of the grant", New Hall formerly known as Ferneley along with several fields, the Barne Flatt, the North Church Hill, South Church Hill, the Riding, the Great Meadow, the Middle Meadow, the Half Acre, the Cow Lane, the Rush Riding, the Ryding lying to the west of the new alehouse, the Mylne Croft, the land to Bullough Moor for the benefit of Katherine Pilkington, On 30 March 1611 a sale was agreed to George Aynesworth of land and property reserved to Katherine Pilkington being Ferneley alias New Hall, being tenanted, Barn Flatt, North Church hill, Church hill, Rydinge at Andertons tenement, Great Meadow and one further field. On a scrap of paper without witnesses, rather than by deed, dated 1620 it was claimed that James sold the benefits of a rent charge from the sale of the estate and any claim upon the property to Robert Lever and Thomas Breres' widow, Ellen. Roberts will had left 25 marks (£16-13-4d) per year to his brother James on condition he did not contest the will to which he had annexed a schedule of his debts.

==== Appointment of constables ====
Records exist of a manorial right held by the Lord of the Manor of Rivington, after Robert Pilkington's death being sworn on oath by all the inhabitants of Rivington, an example follows "Maye it please you[r] hon[our] to be Informed that wee, the Inhabittant[es] of Rivington, beinge Requested to Certiefye oure knowledge howe & in whatt maner the Constables of Rivington have beene usually Apointed to that s[er]vice, Doe hereby Certiefye youre hon[our]: that Mr Pilkington, late Lo[rd] of Rivington, and since his deathe thoes that have had his Inheritance, have yearly had the sole onely denominatio[u]n & Apointemente of the Constables w[i]thin Rivington w[i]thoute gainesayeinge of anie man, And thoes that weere by them soe Apointed have from tyme to tyme served the same office accordingly, And this order hathe beene observed, as wee have heard oulde men Reporte, beyond the memo[ur]ie of anie man, Soe w[i]th our humble duties wee Reste, and shall daly praye for you[r] hono[ur]: Marche the 12 in 1629." The sworn testaments do act as legal proof of the existence of the Manor and this particular right.

==== Breres ====
In the inquisition post mortem of Robert Pilkington in 1610, it was stated the Reverend John Breres, a Presbyterian preacher at Rivington Unitarian Chapel, had bought three messuages, one cottage, four gardens, four orchards, and land in August 1603 of which Robert Pilkington was seized in July 1601. The remainder of the estate was sold to Robert Lever and Thomas Breres' brother of John, on 30 March 1611. In 1667, John Breres mentioned in his will that after the death of his uncle Thomas Breres in 1617, he had mortgaged his interest in the estate to the Rev. James Pilkington of Heaton Rhodes, his wife's uncle, and Alderman William Pilkington of Wigan, a local land owner and father in law. William Breres and his wife Martha Gill lived at the Old Hall. This branch of the Pilkington family were related to the Pilkingtons of Croston Church, also descendants of Nicolas de Pilkington of Salford. William Breres died in 1723 and the estate passed to their son John who sold it in 1729 to John Andrews who had inherited a share from the Levers, who were themselves descendants of the Pilkingtons.

==== Lever of Little Lever ====
Robert Lever of Little Lever near Bolton acquired the estate with Thomas Breres in 1611, having bought the outstanding claims and mortgages. He died in 1620, having given his part of the estate to his youngest son, Robert, a London merchant, in 1617. The Levers were descendants of the Pilkingtons their ancestor being an earlier Robert Lever and his wife Mary Pilkington in the reign of Henry VIII of England. Robert Lever never married and the manor passed to his nephew, another Robert Lever, son of his brother James. Robert Lever had a daughter, Jane, who married John Andrews of Little Lever in 1648.

==== Andrews ====
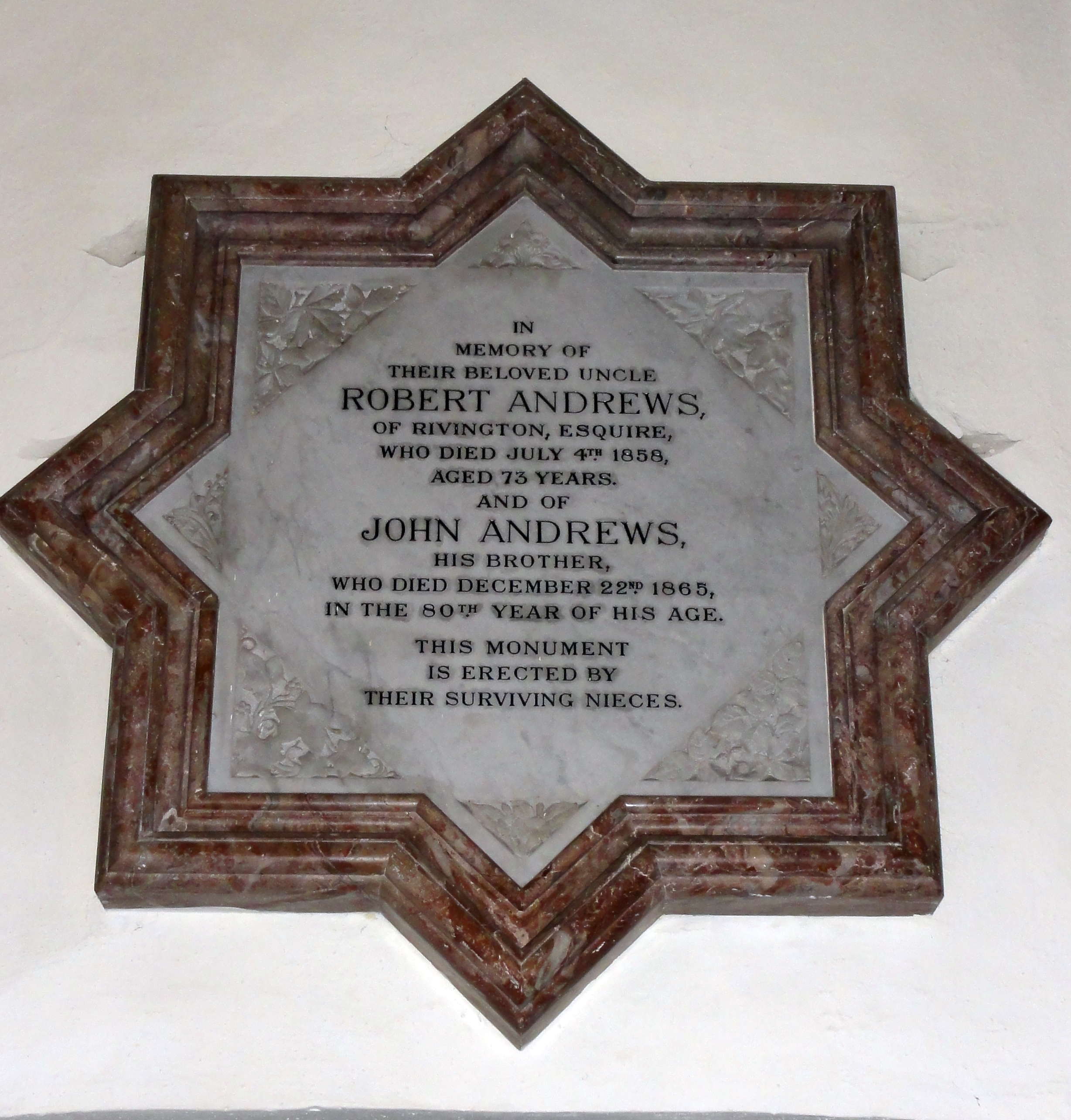
Andrews Memorial, Rivington Unitarian Chapel

In 1648 Jane Lever married John Andrews of Little Lever Hall, a captain in the Roundhead army during the time of the Commonwealth. John Andrews died in 1678. Jane Andrews inherited the Rivington Hall estate from her father, Robert Lever who died aged 80 in 1688. Her share of the estate passed to her son, John Andrews who married Anne Mort of Wharton Hall, Little Hulton in 1682. Their son, the third John Andrews, born in 1684, married Abigail Crook of Abram. In 1729 he purchased the Breres' share making him sole owner of the Rivington Hall estate.

John Andrews died without a male heir in 1743 and the estate passed to his daughter Abigail who married Joseph Wilson of Bolton. Joseph Wilson died in 1765 and the estate reverted to the line of John Andrews' second son, Robert who had married Hannah Crompton in 1712. Their son Joseph Andrews was born in 1715. Robert Andrews died in 1793 and the estate passed to his son, Robert, who created the Andrews Trust of which Rivington was a part. The trust is still in existence today. During Robert Andrews ownership improvements were made to the hall in 1820. Robert Andrews died unmarried in 1858 and the estate passed to his brother, John, who died childless in 1865 and consequently to his sister, Hannah Maria Andrews who married Robert Fletcher of Liverpool. Their daughter Lucy married Woodhouse Crompton in 1834. After the death of Robert Andrews in 1858 his brother, John Andrews took up residence at Rivington Hall during which time his three nieces from Liverpool moved in to attend to his care until his death in 1865. The Tithe Tax in 1850 gives detail of the extent of Rivington Hall in the mid Victorian era, being 32 acres.

By 1840 a process known as enfranchisement had enabled copyholders, those whose land was rented from the manor, to have their holding converted to freehold by the Lord or Lady of the manor, on doing so many owners of manors reserved rights, such as mines, minerals and sporting rights, separating these rights from the land ownership. With a freehold created these retained rights become separately owned saleable assets. All copyhold was automatically converted to freehold by the Law of Property Act 1922.

==== Cromptons ====
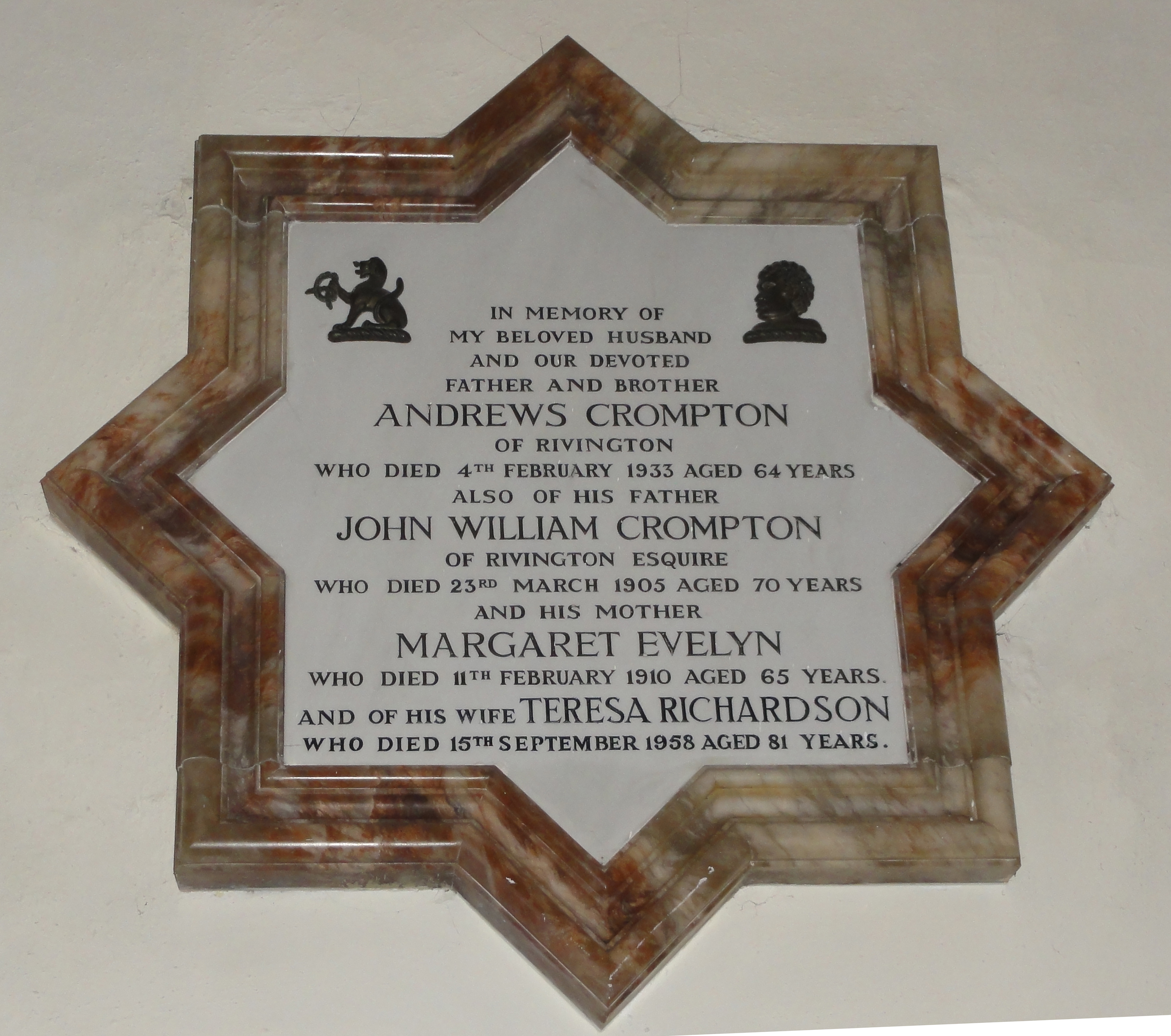
Crompton Memorial, Rivington Unitarian Chapel

Ownership of the freehold estate passed on Robert Andrew's death to John William Crompton who married Margaret Evelyn Leighton in 1853. It is assumed the residue of the manorial rights also followed this route of inheritance. They took up residence at Fisher House in Rivington where they had five children of which two survived, Andrew born 1869 and their last child, Theodore Evelyn born 1881. The Cromptons moved to Rivington Hall in 1882. John Crompton made many improvements to the estate's cottages and farms including a piped water supply via a large tank at the side of Spring Cottage from where water was piped and by 1890 Rivington Unitarian Chapel also had the benefit of a piped water supply. John Crompton made a bad investment at Red Moss, Horwich and after approaching the trustees, it was decided to sell the estate. William Lever was interested and offered £40,000 but the Cromptons wanted £70,000. After months of negotiations an offer of £60,000 was accepted. The sale of freehold is recorded at the land registry. The assertion that the Cromptons sold the manorial rights comes from a book Leverhulme sponsored titled "A short history of the township of Rivington, With Some Account of the Church and Grammar School."

==== Leverhulme ====
In 1900 William Hesketh Lever purchased the hall from the Crompton family and then later sold to Liverpool Corporation by agreement set out in the Liverpool Corporation Act 1902, the transfers completed between 1902 and 1905, the act makes no mention of the manor but does refer to shooting rights to be retained by Leverhulme, he retained an interest over all of his former land which is recorded at the Land Registry preventing development. Leverhulme also retained land for his residence at Terraced Gardens, Rivington until his death in 1925, after which the retained land was sold to McGee, a brewery owner. There is no record of any sale by Leverhulme or his heirs of the manor.

== Lathom of Irlam ==
In 1347 Roger de Westleigh of Irlam, Emma his wife, and Adam de Birkhead of Wigan claimed a fourth part of two messuages in Rivington against Robert de Rivington, Richard his son, and others. Three years earlier, their son Roger, had made a settlement of the fifth part of the manor of Rivington in favour of their son Richard. In the 14th century a quarter of the manor was held by the Westleigh and Birkenhead families. This descended to the Birkenheads and Chisnalls. By the 17th century a quarter was held by the Lathoms of Irlam. In 1640, after the death of Edmund Lathom, the inquisition stated George, the deceased's grandfather, held a quarter of Rivington manor of the Crown and had made a settlement in 1570. George Lathom of Huyton and his wife Elizabeth were engaged in legal action with Richard Pilkington and others in 1549 and 1550, regarding Moldesfield and land in Rivington. Hyefurth House at Deane Head was part of the Lathom estate and the legal action continued until 1614 when Thomas, son of George Lathom, was granted 50 acre in settlement. In 1683 this quarter of the manor was sold by Thomas Lathom of Irelom in association with Thomas Ashurst of Ashurst and Ralph Egerton of Turton, to John Bradley of Rivington for £120, and included messuages, closes and parcels of land in Rivington and 50 acre moiety of waste ground. Bradley's Farmhouse is a listed building.

== Shaw of Rivington, Heath Charnock and Anglezarke ==
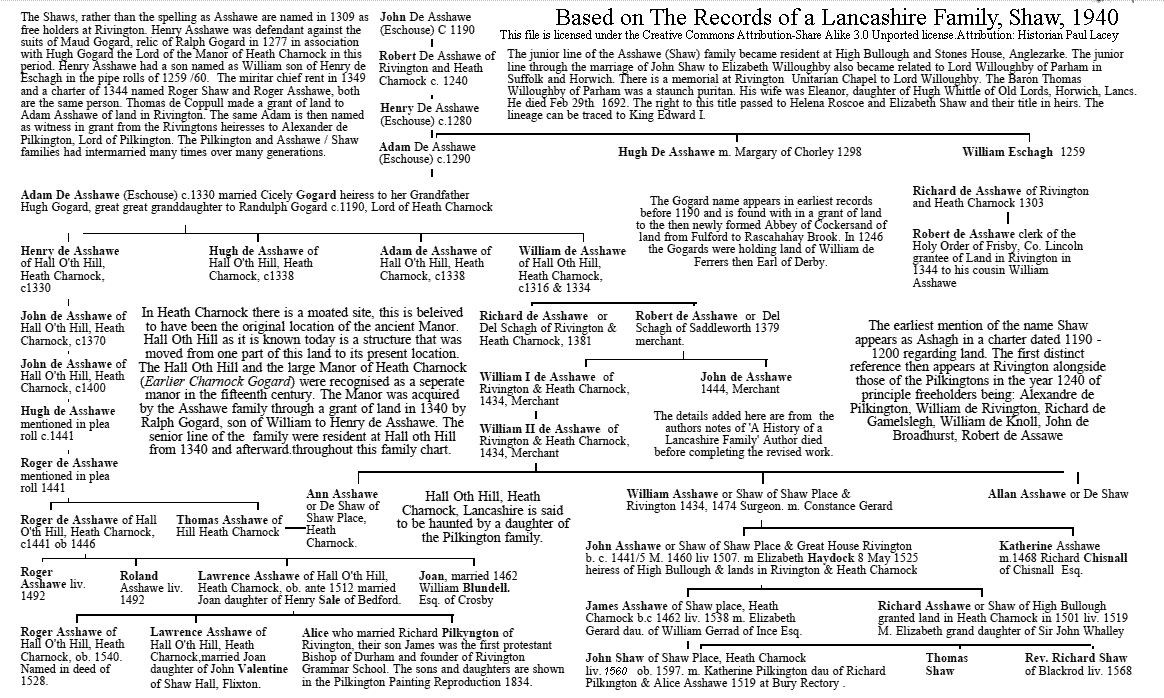
Family Tree of Alice Asshaw

Owners of an eighth share of the manor were the Shaw family. John Shaw married Elizabeth Haydock of High Bullough in Anglezarke, he was a defendant in litigation in 1507, 1528, and 1545 relating to the eighth part of the manor originally held by the Hultons. His grandson, John, married Katherine, sister of Bishop James Pilkington. Robert, son of Thomas Shaw, made a settlement of the eighth part of the manor and other lands in 1606. The Shaw portion was sold to John Risley in 1656 to raise funds for recovery from the English Civil War. Peter Shaw Junior bought back the estate in 1663, selling it some time later and buying it back from John Breres in 1671. The Shaw and Pilkington family are related, a further connection being through Alice, wife of Richard Pilkington and mother of James, Bishop of Durham.

Peter Shaw and his son, Thomas, were in debt at the beginning of the 18th century and sold their estate to Hugh Willoughby, 12th Baron Willoughby of Parham. The estate passed to the 15th Baron. In 1765 on the death of Lord Willoughby the estate passed to his sisters, Elizabeth Shaw and Helena Roscoe. Some land in Rivington and Anglezarke was sold. Elizabeth Shaw died in 1787. The right to the manorial title of this share was last a local man named Martin Brownlow, now deceased whose records are held at Bolton Library Archives.
