= Pilkington of Lancashire =

English family

The Pilkington family has its origins in the ancient township of Pilkington in the historic county of Lancashire, England. After about 1405 the family seat was Stand Old Hall which was built to replace Old Hall in Pilkington. The new hall was built on high land overlooking Pilkington's medieval deer park. Stand Old Hall was replaced by Stand Hall to the south in 1515 after the Pilkingtons were dispossessed. Stand Old Hall became a barn. It is possible that Sir Thomas Pilkington had permission to “embattle” his manor house in 1470 building a stone tower. It was a ruin by the 1950s and demolished in the early 1960s.

The Pilkington name is taken from the manor of Pilkington in Prestwich, Lancashire. The Pilkington arms consist of an argent field with a cross patonce voided gules. The Pilkington crest has a mower with his scythe and has a legend that an ancestor of the family, being sought at the time of the Norman Conquest, disguised himself as a mower and escaped. Ye Olde Man & Scythe Inn in Bolton derives its name from the reaper, its sign depicts a man using a scythe.

Pilkington escutcheon

The Horwich Town crest incorporates the arms of the family within its design. The crest was first recorded on a seal from 1424.

Throughout the county there were a number of branches of the family, including those from Rivington Hall, Rivington near Chorley and from Windle Hall, Windle, St Helens, the Pilkington glass manufacturers.

== Pilkington of Pilkington ==
The first known is Alexander de Pilkington (born c. 1110 - died 1180), his sons were Alexander de Pilkington (born 1185 - died 1231) and William de Pilkington and daughter Alice who were party to a Final Concord in 1202 regarding land in Rivington, where Alexander had inherited six Oxgang of land on which he paid Tallage, in the same year Alexander, William and Alice recovered from Thomas de Rawinton release of two and half Oxgangs with appurtenances in Rivington and Worsthorne, Alexander retained one and a half Oxgangs in Rivington and granted Thomas de Rawinton one Oxgang in Worsthrone and through legal action known as Assize of mort d'ancestor Henry de Pulkinton released his rights to Alexander of three Oxgangs in Rivington and Worsthorne. At the Great Inquest of 1212, being one of seventeen Knights he held land under Robert de Gresle 5th Baron of Manchester and held his land at Rivington in Thanage of the King. Alexander died between 1231 and 1242.

Roger (died before 1270) is first recorded as paying Scutage fee as a Knight and in possession of the Manor of Pilkington under the Baron of Manchester Thomas de Gresle, also holding six Oxgangs at Rivington. Alexander's exact year of death is unknown. He took legal action for trespass on his land in Sholver and in 1247 quit claimed lands in Saddleworth to the Abbot of Roche Abbey. Alexander's second son was Robert, whose own son Robert was killed by an arrow in 1291. Robert's other son Adam fell from an oak in 1292. Alexander had a possible third son named John, whose son Richard married Joan de Pennington in 1309.

On the death of Roger c.1270 his son Alexander (born 1225 - died 1291) inherited titles and estates, he increased his land holding at Rivington, by buying up smaller holdings. A year prior to his death he transferred his Rivington lands to his second son Richard on his son's marriage c.1290. From then on the Rivington estate was held by the junior branch. Roger's eldest son was named after his father, two younger sons were John, whose sons Thomas of Salford is recorded as paying lay subsidy, Henry, the third son held three burgesses in Salford and his youngest was Adam of Bolton and Sharples. Adam the younger son married Maud de Pendlebury, inheriting life interest in the Manors of Wickleswick and Pendlebury and land in Sharples on the death of his wife. Adam died without issue; he was murdered in 1298 by Henry de Wode.

Roger (born 1255 - died 1322) married three times. His first wife was daughter of Sir Gilbert Barton, with whom he had two sons Roger and William. He inherited a sixth of the Manor of Barton on the death of his wife in c.1295, his second wife was Alice, daughter of Sir Ralph de Otteby, and they had one child Alexander. He received for himself and his heirs the Manor of Otteby in 1295 by this marriage. His third wife was Margery Middleton, from whom he received lands in Great Lever in Bolton along with one third of a mill at Reddish. After his death his widow Margery remarried in 1323 to Sir Adam de Swillington and recovered estates that were seized by the King. Roger had inherited the Knighthood and Manor of Pilkington. He was granted free warren of shooting rights at Pilkington, Whitefield, Unsworth, Crompton, Sholver and Wolstenholme in 1291. Roger also held the revision on the lands at Sharples in which his brother Adam had life interest. In 1312 he had settled the Manors of Pilkington and Cheetham on his son eldest son Roger, with provision that his younger son William would inherit should his eldest son Roger not have issue. In 1314 he served at the Battle of Bannockburn. He was captured during the Battle of Boroughbridge March 1322 and held at Tickhill Castle until July. He died in the same year.

Roger, son of the above (born 1291 - died 1343), married Alicia, sister and heir of Henry de Bury and the manor of Bury. Alice died in 1374 intestate and her son Roger was administrator of her estate.

Roger was followed by his son, and attended John of Gaunt in France in 1359, served as knight of the shire in six Parliaments between 1363 and 1384 and died in 1407. Roger Pilkington and his father, also Roger, were present with Thomas, 2nd Earl of Lancaster, at the Battle of Boroughbridge in 1322. The older Roger was imprisoned and fined, his son secured pardon by undertaking military service abroad. His son Sir Roger Pilkington (1325–1407) served under Henry of Grosmont, 1st Duke of Lancaster in 1355, and under John of Gaunt in 1359–60 and 1369.

Roger's son Sir John Pilkington (d. 1421) was granted custody of the manors of Prestwich and Alkrington. He married Margaret (d. 1436), heir of John Verdon of Brixworth, Northamptonshire, soon after the death of her first husband, Hugh Bradshaw of Leigh. Margaret's son from her first marriage, William Bradshaw, died in 1415, but he left a daughter, Elizabeth. In 1430 Margaret settled the manors of her inheritance which included Stagenhoe in Hertfordshire, Clipston, Northamptonshire and Brixworth in Northamptonshire, and Bressingham in Norfolk, on her Pilkington sons, John, Edmund (d. about 1451), and Robert (d. 1457). Roger attended the king in the Scottish expedition of 1400 and was one of the Lancashire knights who fought at Agincourt, he died in 1421. His son Sir John inherited aged twenty-eight years and he too, fought in the French wars. He was knight of the shire in 1416 and 1418, and rewarded for his services by being made escheator in Ireland. Rivington later became the home of a junior branch of the family.

He died without issue in 1451, and the manor descended to Thomas, son of Edmund Pilkington, his nephew. Thomas was the son of Edmund, and enjoyed the favour of Edward IV. The Pilkingtons built a house with a moat at Bury between 1359 and 1400 and were granted a licence to crenellate it in 1469 when it became known as Bury Castle. He was appointed Knight of the Order of the Bath in 1475 and was Knighted on the battlefield at the capture of Berwick in 1481, he was previously a Knight Bachelor. He fought for Richard III at Battle of Bosworth Field and was attainted by the victorious Henry, his manors in Lancashire confiscated and were given to the newly created Earl of Derby. Sir Thomas Pilkington was granted Royal pardon in 1508.

The Pilkington Knights fought in the Wars of the Roses and in the 15th century three members of the family were High Sheriffs of Lancashire. Their Pilkington relatives included Sir Charles Pilkington who was appointed High Sheriff of Nottingham and Derby in 1480.

== Pilkingtons of Rivington ==
The early Pilkingtons were step brothers of the Rivingtons and a grant of land was made to them in 1202. In 1212 the Pilkingtons held of King John of England, in thanage, six oxgangs of land at a rent of 10s. Rivington was held by the Pilkingtons of Pilkington until 1290 when Sir Alexander de Pilkington (1225–1291) gave his lands at Rivington to his second son, Richard, as a wedding gift on his marriage to Ellen daughter of William de Anderton, of Rumworth and Anderton. Rivington was afterwards held by the junior branch of the family, who became known as the Pilkingtons of Rivington, the first record of a member of the family living at Rivington was Richards son Robert who is first found on the lay subsidy in 1322 after reaching the age to succeed to the Manor in 1318. (born c.1297 - died c.1382) In 1324 Roger de Pilkington held seven-eighths of the manor at a rent of 8s. 9d while Richard de Hulton held the other eighth for 1s. 3d. p.a. This partition appears again in 1445. Robert Pilkington is mentioned in lay subsidies of 1327 and 1332. In 1477 a contract was drawn up between Robert Pilkington and Adam Holden to build a cross chamber with two great windows at Rivington Hall. The Pilkingtons held the Manor of Rivington until the death of Robert Pilkington in 1605 and his share of the manor was sold on 30 March 1611 to relatives Robert Lever and Thomas Breres for £1730 retaining New Hall, along with the other lands for the benefit of Katherine Pilkington and her heirs.

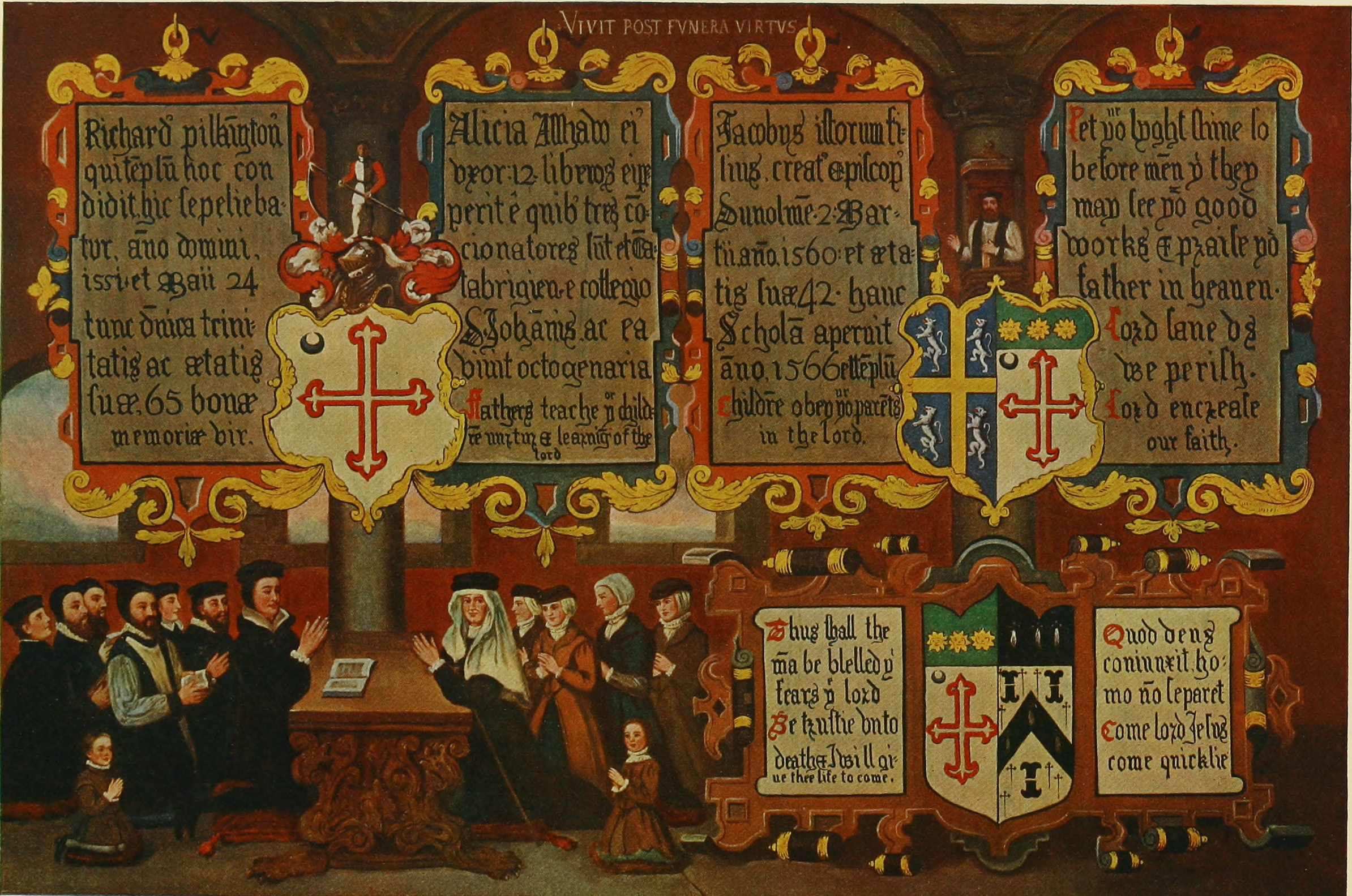
Pilkington painting

The most notable of the Pilkingtons of Rivington was James Pilkington, first Protestant Bishop of Durham, born about 1518, the son of Richard Pilkington of Rivington Hall and Alice Asshawe, he founded the free Grammar school at Rivington, in 1566 on a charter being granted by Queen Elizabeth I. The land was leased to the school from 1587 by George Pilkington on its original site in Rivington village. Another school was built on the border with Horwich now known as Rivington and Blackrod High School after amalgamation in 1875 with the nearby Blackrod Grammar School, the charter also granted the rights of an Anglican Church on the village Chapel, built by his father Richard Pilkington.

The family are recorded in the Pilkington painting. The original picture measured 53 by 35 inches and damaged by a fire in 1834. A copy had been created in 1821 and from that another made in 1835 which is on display at Rivington Church.
