= Ye Olde Man & Scythe =

Listed pub in Bolton, Greater Manchester, England

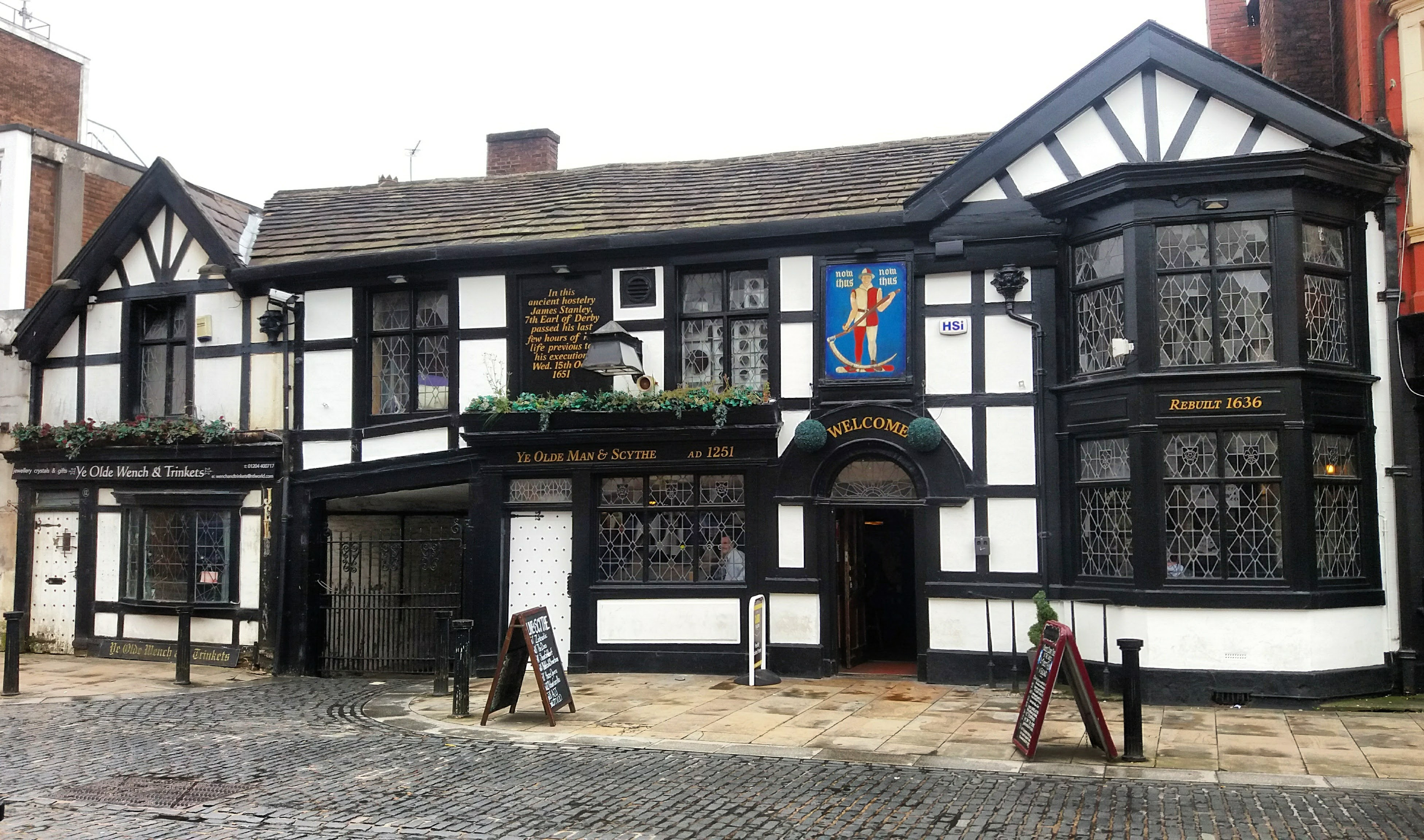
- The pub in 2017

- Location within Greater Manchester

General information
- Location: 6–8 Churchgate, Bolton, Greater Manchester, England
- Coordinates: 53°34′47″N 2°25′35″W
- Year built: 1636; 390 years ago (rebuilt)
- Renovated: 20th century (remodelled)
- Owner: Heineken UK

Design and construction
- Designations

Listed Building – Grade II
- Official name: Old Man and Scythe public house
- Designated: 26 April 1974
- Reference no.: 1387975

Ye Olde Man & Scythe is a Grade II listed public house on Churchgate in Bolton, Greater Manchester, England. The current building dates largely to a 1636 rebuild on a historic burgage plot. Although local tradition claims the pub is named in a 1251 royal charter, that document only granted Bolton's market rights and makes no mention of an inn. The current form of the name, prefixed with "Ye Olde", is a pseudo-archaism derived from the original Man and Scythe Inn. The name itself originates from the crest of the Pilkington family, which features a reaper using a scythe, alluding to a tradition associated with one of the family's early members.

== History ==
It is not known exactly when Ye Olde Man & Scythe was first built. Although popular tradition holds that the inn is named in a 1251 royal charter, that document—granted by Henry III to William de Ferrers on 14 December 1251—only established Bolton's weekly market rights and makes no mention of a public house. The pub has been rebuilt at least once, in 1636 according to the datestone inside, and only the vaulted cellar remains from the original structure, although some internal beams also date from 1636. The frontage is an early 20th-century remodelling.

In 1651 the Earl of Derby was executed outside the Man & Scythe, which was owned by his family at the time, for his role in the Bolton Massacre. A cross now marks the site, accompanied by a plaque that recounts the history of Bolton. Inside the pub is a chair said to have been used by the Earl immediately before he was taken outside to be beheaded. Its inscription reads: "15th October 1651 In this chair James 7th Earl of Derby sat at the Man and Scythe Inn, Churchgate, Bolton immediately prior to his execution".

On 26 April 1974, Ye Olde Man & Scythe was designated a Grade II listed building. It forms part of a short run of historic buildings on Churchgate, standing directly next to the Swan Hotel, also Grade II-listed.

The pub is regarded by the Campaign for Real Ale (CAMRA) as having an interior of "special national historic importance" and is rated one star in its grading scheme. As of June 2026, the pub's freehold was owned by Heineken UK.

== Architecture ==
=== Exterior ===
The inn has a timber frame and a slate roof. The building, which houses both a public house and a shop, features a four-window range with gables at each end. The two-storey public house occupies the central range and the right-hand gable, which includes canted bay windows on both floors. A round-arched doorway leads into the public house, with a three-light window to its left. On the first floor are two casement windows. The ground floor window frames and leaded windows date from the early 20th century, while the doorway is older. An entry to the yard separates the pub from the shop. The shop front in the left-hand gable has a doorway beside a canted oriel window, with a two-light mullioned and transomed window above. The shop front appears to date from the early 19th century.

=== Interior ===
The small room at the front right, reached by a step, has a plain wooden floor with fixed seating around the bay window and along the other walls.The exterior windows have leaded glass with bell‑pushes and a shield motif. The rear right room, also reached by a step, has a bare wooden floor and older fixed seating around most of the space. Bell‑pushes are set in a panel above, and the room has an ornate plaster ceiling.

== See also ==
- Listed buildings in Bolton
- Listed pubs in Greater Manchester
