= Rivington Unitarian Chapel =

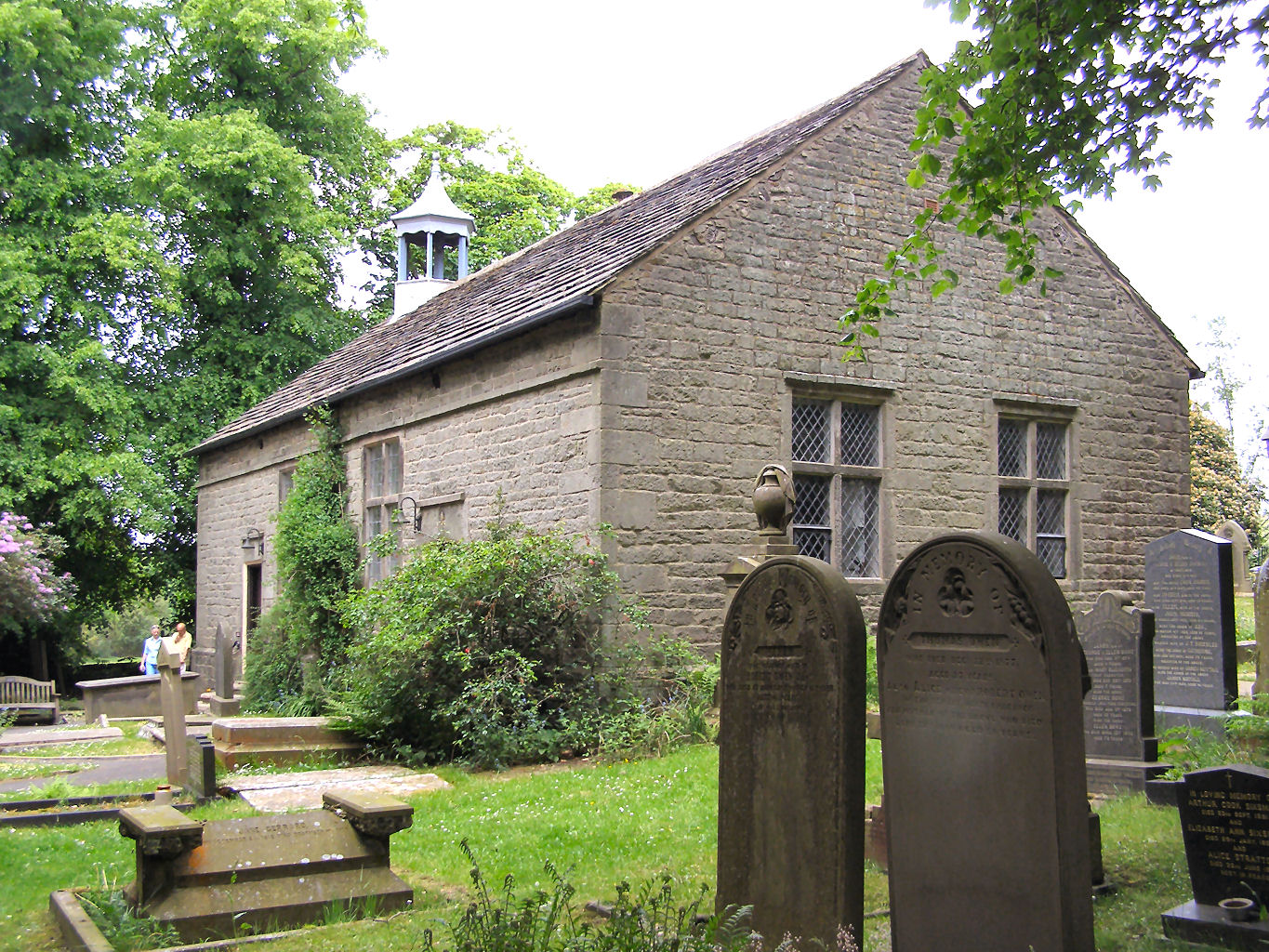
- Unitarian Chapel, Rivington

- Position of the chapel in the Borough of Chorley
- Rivington Unitarian Chapel
- 53.6255°N 2.5652°W
- OS grid reference: SD 62688 14517
- Location: Rivington, Lancashire
- Country: England
- Denomination: Unitarian
- Website: Official website

History
- Founded: 1703

Architecture
- Functional status: Active
- Heritage designation: Grade II* listed building

Specifications
- Materials: local gritstone

Rivington Unitarian Chapel is an active place of Unitarian worship in Rivington, Lancashire, England. It was founded in 1703, although its congregation dates to 1667. It is designated as a Grade II* listed building with some restoration in 1990, and hs ongoing preservation.

== History ==
The Presbyterians had state backing and held power during the Commonwealth, support for the Puritans was strong, a local martyr being George Marsh. The power of the Church of England was re-asserted through the Clarendon Code after the English Restoration in 1660 by persecuting Nonconformists to force them to conform to use of the Book of Common Prayer in services, requiring prayers for the King, resulting in the Great Ejection on "Bartholemew Sunday" in 1662 when 2500 Ministers left their Churches.

Samuel Newton of Rivington Church was one of the Ministers ejected in 1662, many of his congregation followed him and formed the first nonconformist congregation at Rivington. Laws followed including the Conventicle Act 1664 that prohibited unauthorised religious meetings of more than five people and the Five Mile Act 1665 to suppress nonconformist clergy. William Anderton was an early benefactor to the chapel leaving funds in 1670 in his will for Ministers John Walker and Samuel Newton. Newton gained a licence as a Presbyterian Teacher in 1672 and returned to preach at Rivington Church in 1674, his name appears on the list of ministers. In the same year Mr Hill of Rivington, a Presbyterian teacher was also granted license to preach in any place allowed. (Note: Hill is likely a misspelling of the name of Isaac Gill) Newton made his will 6 March and died 11 March 1682, he described his occupation as Clerk, he and his family, to whom he left considerable property in Blackburn and Padiham, resided at New Hall, he was interred in the Chancel of Rivington Church. Newton was succeeded by the Rev. John Walker who died in 1702. The first Minister of the chapel was the Rev. Ralph Ainsworth 1704 to 1716.

Thomas Anderton of School Brow farm left £100 to aid the nonconformists in 1683, in 1686 Rev. John Breres was conducting services at their meeting places. By 1697 George Brownlow and George Shaw added to the Chapel funds. Records of meeting places in 1702 shortly prior to the building of the chapel are in Quarter Sessions 'Record of Dissenting Meeting Houses', properties named were a house belonging to Arthur Davies, Sheepcoate and Pilkington House.

The Willoughbys of Parham, of Shaw Place, Heath Charnock were prominent Presbyterians. and Hugh Willoughby was one of the first trustees and benefactors of the chapel, which was built in 1703 on land named Goosehey given for a peppercorn rent on a 2000-year lease by John Andrews of Rivington Manor, with the stipulation it should only be used for religious services of Protestants dissenting from the Church of England. The chapel was built of four bays measuring 40 by 30 yards. By 1704 a formal trust deed had been signed and by 1737 the chapel was well funded. Rev. John Turner, minister here 1716 to 1717 had assisted the defeat of the Jacobite rising at the Battle of Preston 1715. Between 1717 and 1729 records presented to government show a congregation of 395. At Rivington Chapel the Unitarian doctrine replaced Presbyterianism in 1754 and around that time the chapel became licensed for weddings, the license was changed in 2021 to enable same sex marriages to take place here. Rivington Church and Rivington Grammar School remained under the influence of leading nonconformist figures including the Lancashire Lords Willoughby of Parham and the new nonconformist owners of Rivington Manor, the influence over the Rivington Church lasted until 1763, despite numerous laws to suppress nonconformity.

In 1760 four men, Hugh Makinson, Moses Cocker, Thomas Anderton and John Ashworth, rallied support to build the Presbyterian Lee Chapel in Horwich, in opposition of Unitarianism at Rivington. The chapel joined an existing congregation, which had first met in the house of Thomas Willoughby in Horwich from 1672 and this led to the building of a new chapel there in 1774. In this way the Horwich and Rivington chapels were "rent in twain", to quote the local historian Thomas Hampson writing in 1893.

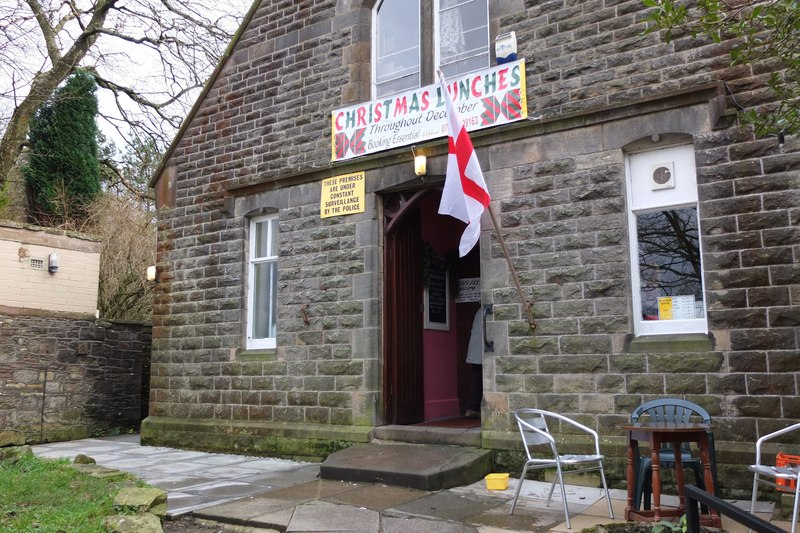
Former School House, now a Tea room

A manse, or minister's house, was built in 1787. A Sunday school began in 1795 in the adjacent school house and a library was added by Rev James Taylor, operating between 1821 and 1985. The congregation of the chapel stopped an invasion of Methodists who tried to convert them by holding a loud service at the chapel gates in 1893 in an attempt to overpower the congregation of the chapel indoors. The Methodist preacher was overcome by the noise from the banging of a silver tea tray by the occupant of New Hall, who like other villagers was annoyed at the intrusion. J. M. Andrews, the second Prime Minister of Northern Ireland, was married to Jessie Ormrod at the chapel in 1902.

The interior of the chapel had extensive repairs in 1952 and 1960. The chapel was the focus of a national pilgrimage of Unitarians in 1961. The manse is now a private residence; money from the sale was used to create a garden of remembrance in 1970 with surrounding wall containing niches for crematorium ashes. After the library closed in 1985, the building became a café, now known as Rivington Village Green Tea Room. The exterior had major work again more recently, especially to the roof area to preserve it in 2016 at a cost of £35,828, £5000 for land drain repair and for toilet drain repair £3,480 in 2022.

== Architecture ==
=== Exterior ===
The chapel is a plain structure, originally with a Thatched roof which remained repaired as late as 1790. The building is of local gritstone with quoins at the corners and now has a slate roof. It has a small, hexagonal bellcote on the west gable, the bell is recorded as being purchased in 1876. The side walls have two cross-windows with rectangular panes of glass and the gable walls have windows with small diamond-latticed panes of glass. On the south side are two doorways with chamfered surrounds; over one door is a lintel dated 1703. At the north-west corner is a two-storey wing with a tall chimney stack, which was the school house. The building is surrounded by a drystone wall and the chapel's original bell and its cast iron gates dating to 1816 survive.

=== Interior ===
The ceiling is supported by oak beams. The chapel is plainly painted inside with lime wash with recorded use since 1808. On the north wall between the windows is a raised five-sided panelled pulpit with carved frieze and moulded cornice, one of few remaining in its original position, most having been moved in the Victorian era. A rail at the front of the pulpit is inscribed with the words 'Marriages may be solemnised in this chapel', this originates to eventual recognition in 1754 of marriages conducted in the chapel and is a reminder that the congregation was once oppressed. The chapel retains its box pews, which were originally individually owned or rented. The Willoughby pew by the south wall has a large ornate canopy with paneled reredos and a moulded and carved cornice in the classical style. There is a choir stall at the east end. The church organ at the south-east corner was a gift in 1843 from Halliwell Road Unitarian Chapel in Bolton, and has been restored, some of the original pews were removed to make way for the organ. Inscribed in the wood of the pews at this side highlighted in gold leaf are the words 'Let the peeling organ blow'. The chapel has electric lighting added during renovations in 1952 and the original candle holders have been retained.

== Monuments ==
=== Interior ===
The memorial to Rev. Samuel Newton is a broken piece of slate that was recovered from the chapel yard by workmen in 1844 and was reassembled and mounted in a frame above the entrance and reads "Rev Samuel Newton driven from Church on Bartholomew Sunday 1662". On the north wall is large 18th-century monument to the family of the 11th to 15th Barons Willoughby of Parham. Brass plates on two pew doors are inscribed "Robert Andrews, John William Crompton, Andrew Crompton" and "The Right Honorable Hugh Lord Willoughyby F.R.S of Parham obit 1765".

=== Chapel Yard ===
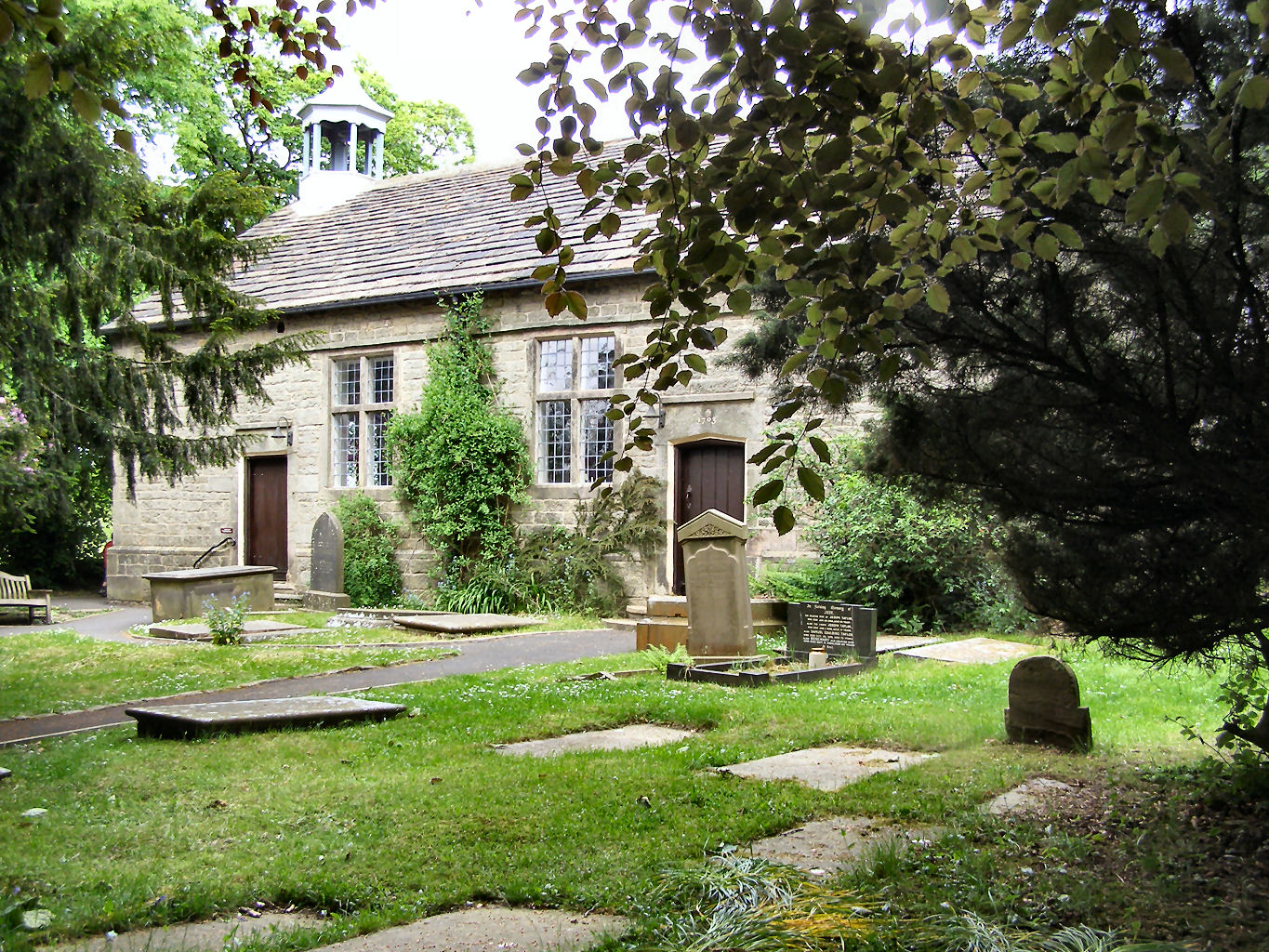
Rivington Unitarian Chapel, Graveyard

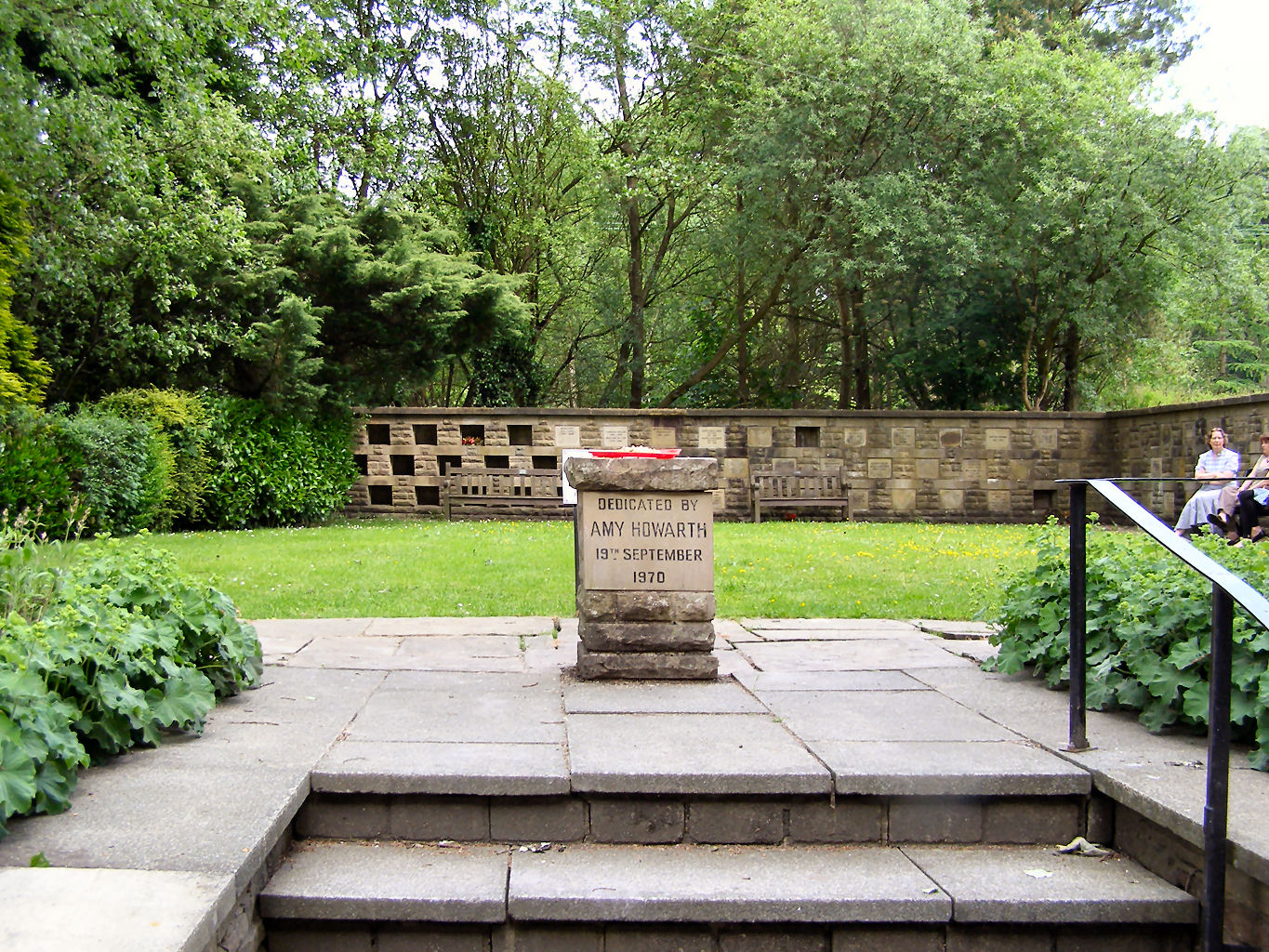
Walled Garden, Cremation Niches

The original chapel yard had no path and was covered by grass. Until the early 20th century the chapel was heavily covered in Ivy and the gate was kept locked and entry was accompanied if no service was being conducted, during which the service was conducted with windows open in summer. Gravestones are a variety of types, with the earlier ones being slabs raised by stone sides, many of the raised grave slabs had to be lowered to ground level due to the supports sinking by the mid 20th century. Some graves at ground level were surrounded by decorative wrought iron railings, the ironwork was removed in World War II by government for use in munitions production. There are graves here with monuments to the Pilkingtons, Andrews, and Cromptons, Lords of the Manor of Rivington; the Shaws, whose ancestry can be traced to 1190; the Ormrods; Samuel Oldknow "of Nottingham, late of Anderton", who died on 7 August 1759 and whose son, Samuel Oldknow, was a factory owner and the first Mayor of Bolton, C. J. Darbyshire. A plaque commemorates Walt Whitman, celebrated on 31 May 1913 by the minister, Samuel Thompson and the Eagle Street College.

There are Four date stones in the graveyard at either side of the entrance one dated 1695, another stone inscribed with initials I over IR 1698 being the initials of James and Rebecca Isherwood, from Woods Farm otherwise known as Ainsworths Farm. Others are from Rivington Hall coach house 1713 with initials WBMI, is William and wife Martha Breres and John and 1732 A over AI are the initials of John Andrews and his wife Abigail.

== Services and administration ==
Historically Sunday service was 10am and dress code adopted by the congregation was formal, it is now smart casual. Until the 20th century young females would attend carrying poseys of lad's-love, Thyme, Pink's, and roses, the Preacher arrived directly into Chapel, in plain clothing, no gown and prior to arrival of the organ in 1843 music was by way of a Bassoon and violoncello, hymn numbers were given to the congregation by writing them on a slate with chalk, there is now a hymn board.

The congregation is a member of the Manchester District Association of Unitarian and Free Christian Churches, part of the umbrella organisation for British Unitarians, the General Assembly of Unitarian and Free Christian Churches.

The chapel's motto is:

"Here is quietness for the healing of our spirits;
Here is history for the background of our lives;
Here let no one be a stranger."

== Gallery ==
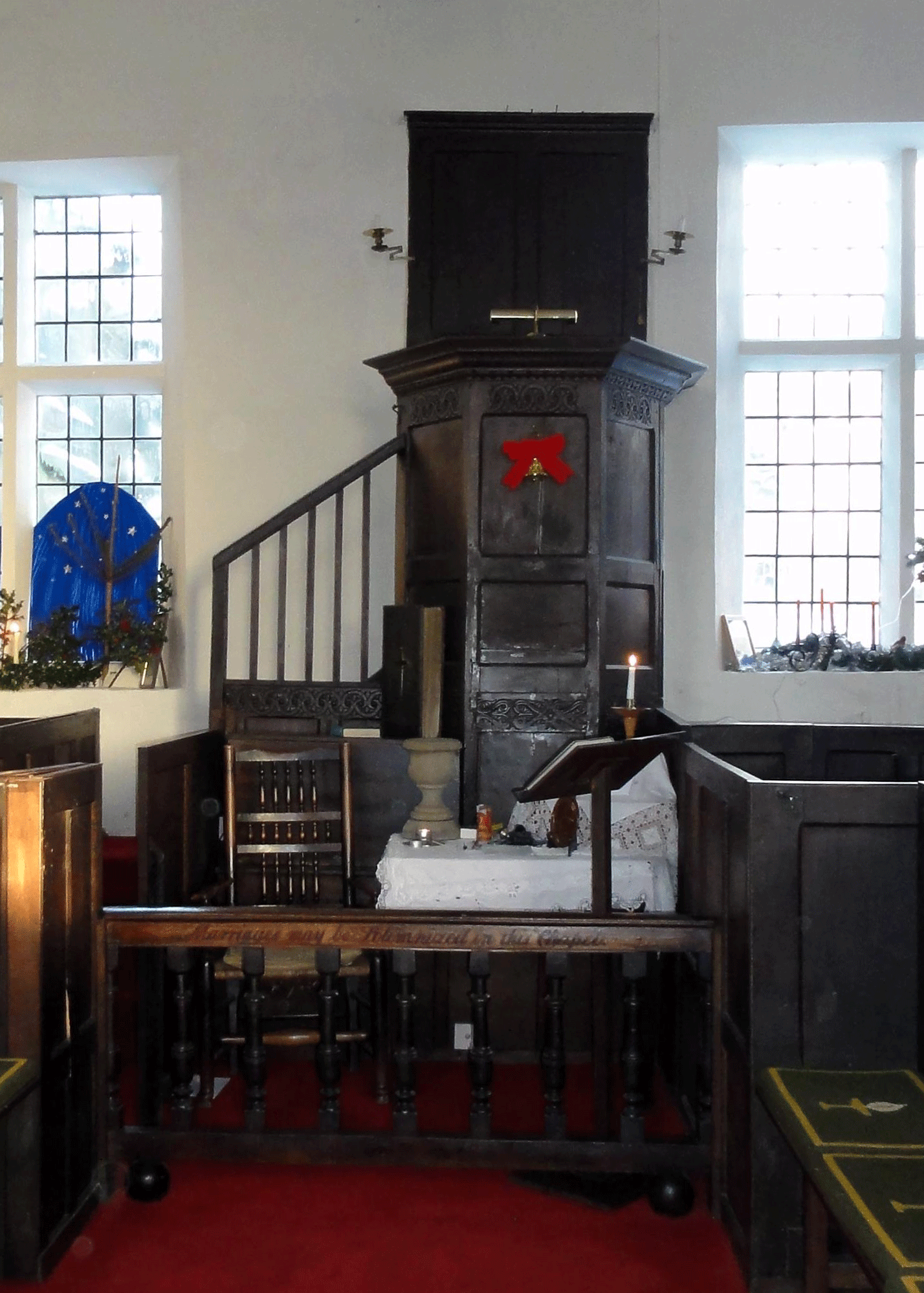
Pulpit, north wall

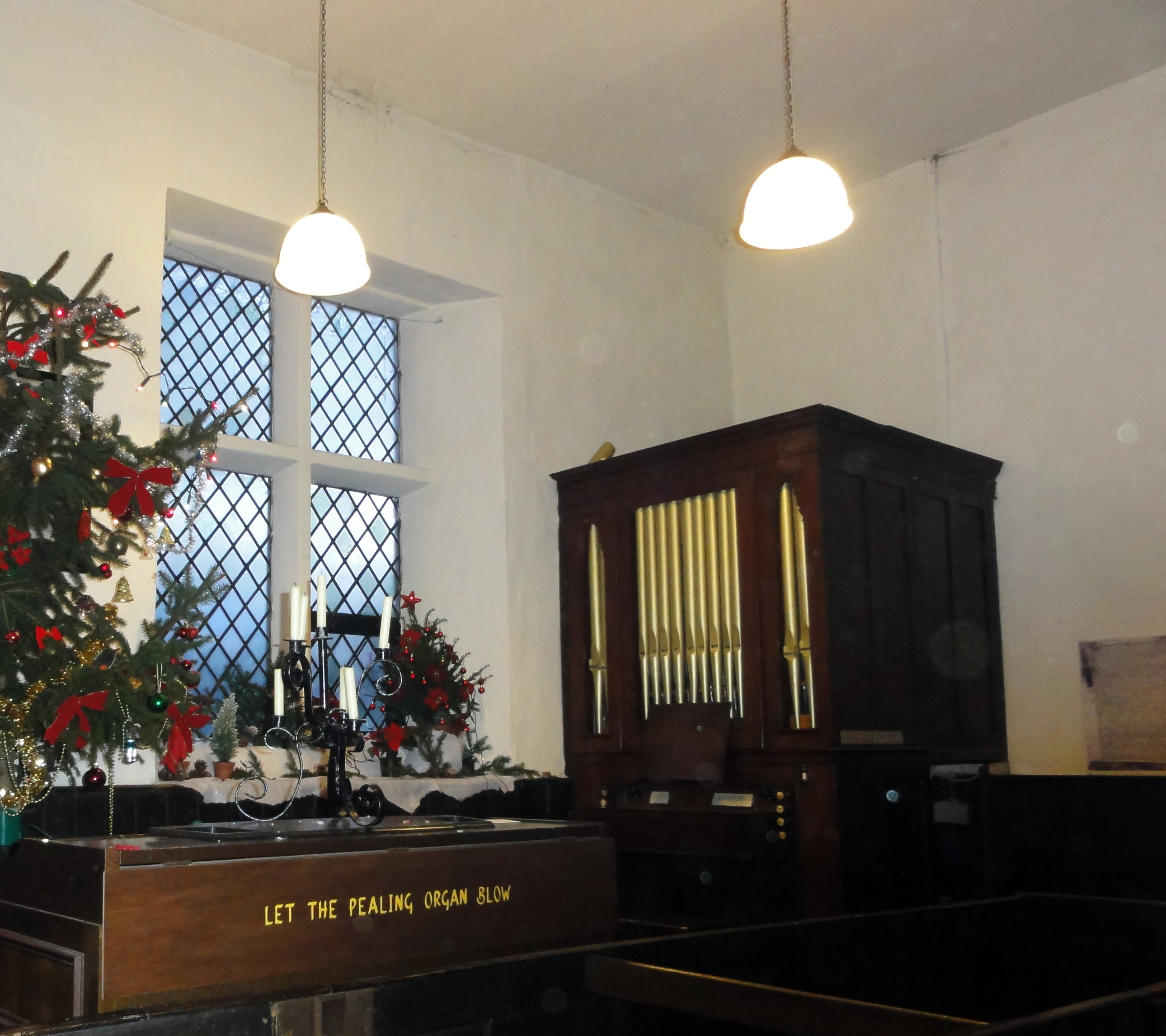
Church organ, interior south-east corner

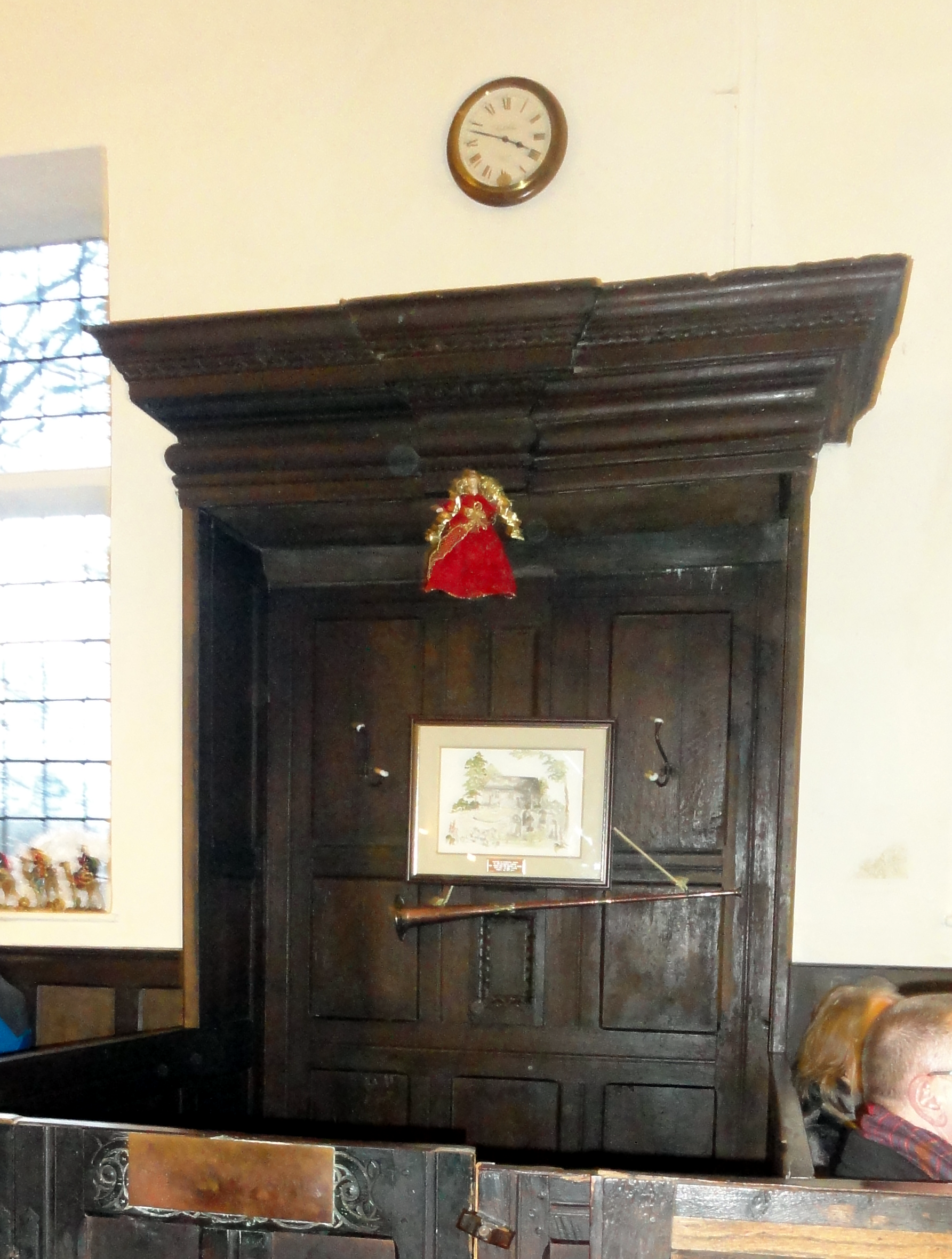
Willoughby Canopy

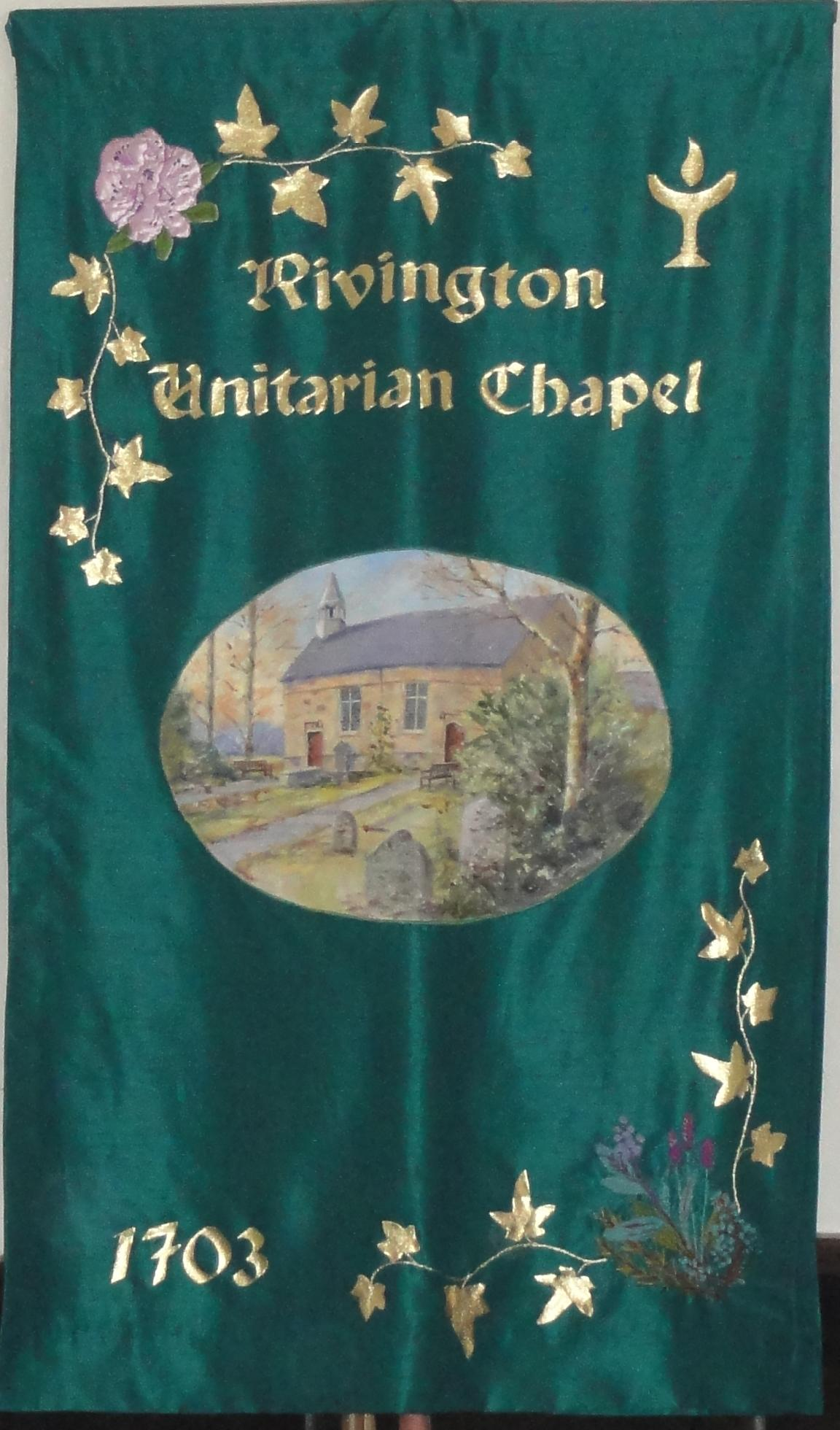
Rivington Unitarian Chapel Banner

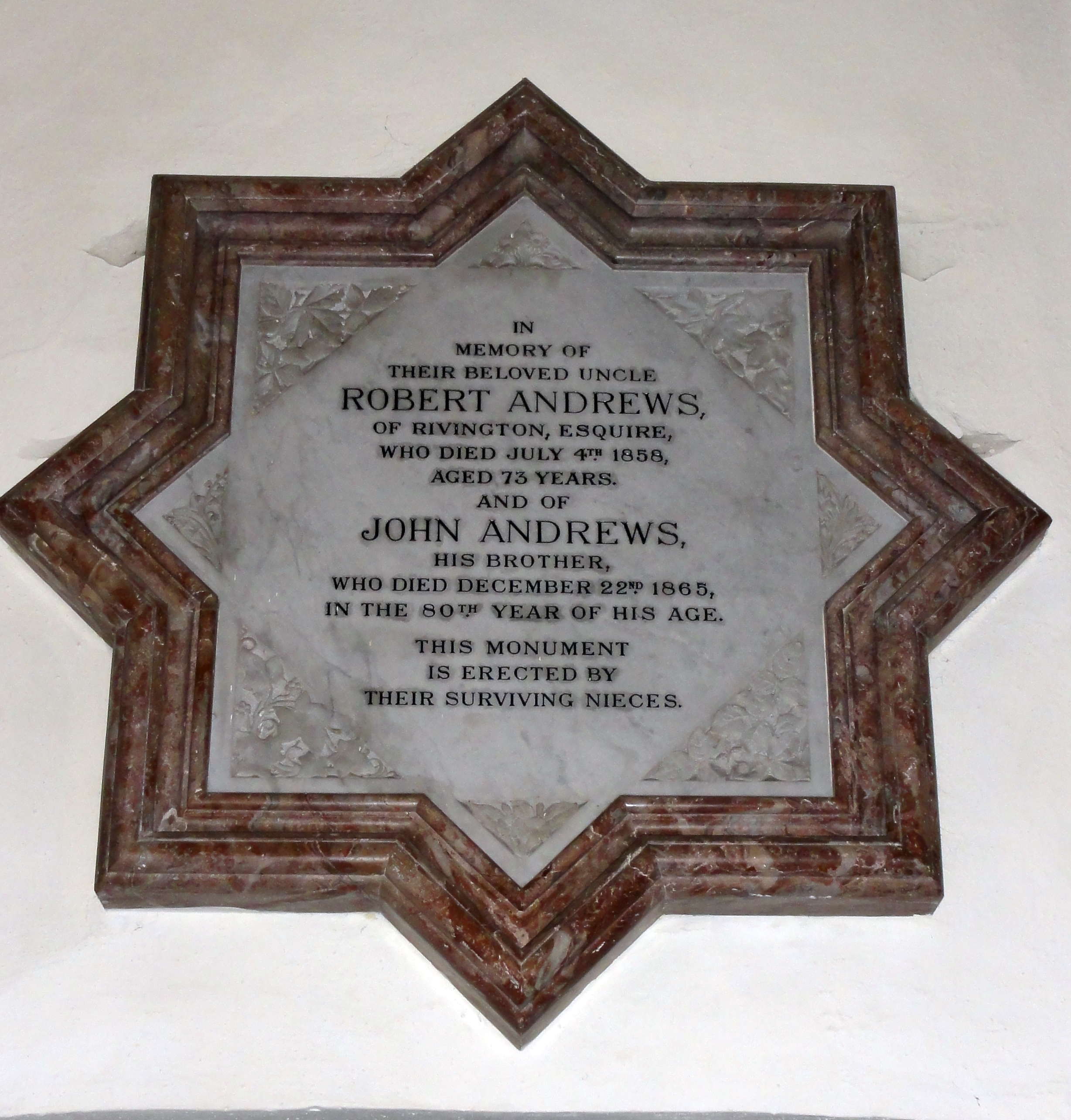
Andrews memorial, interior south wall

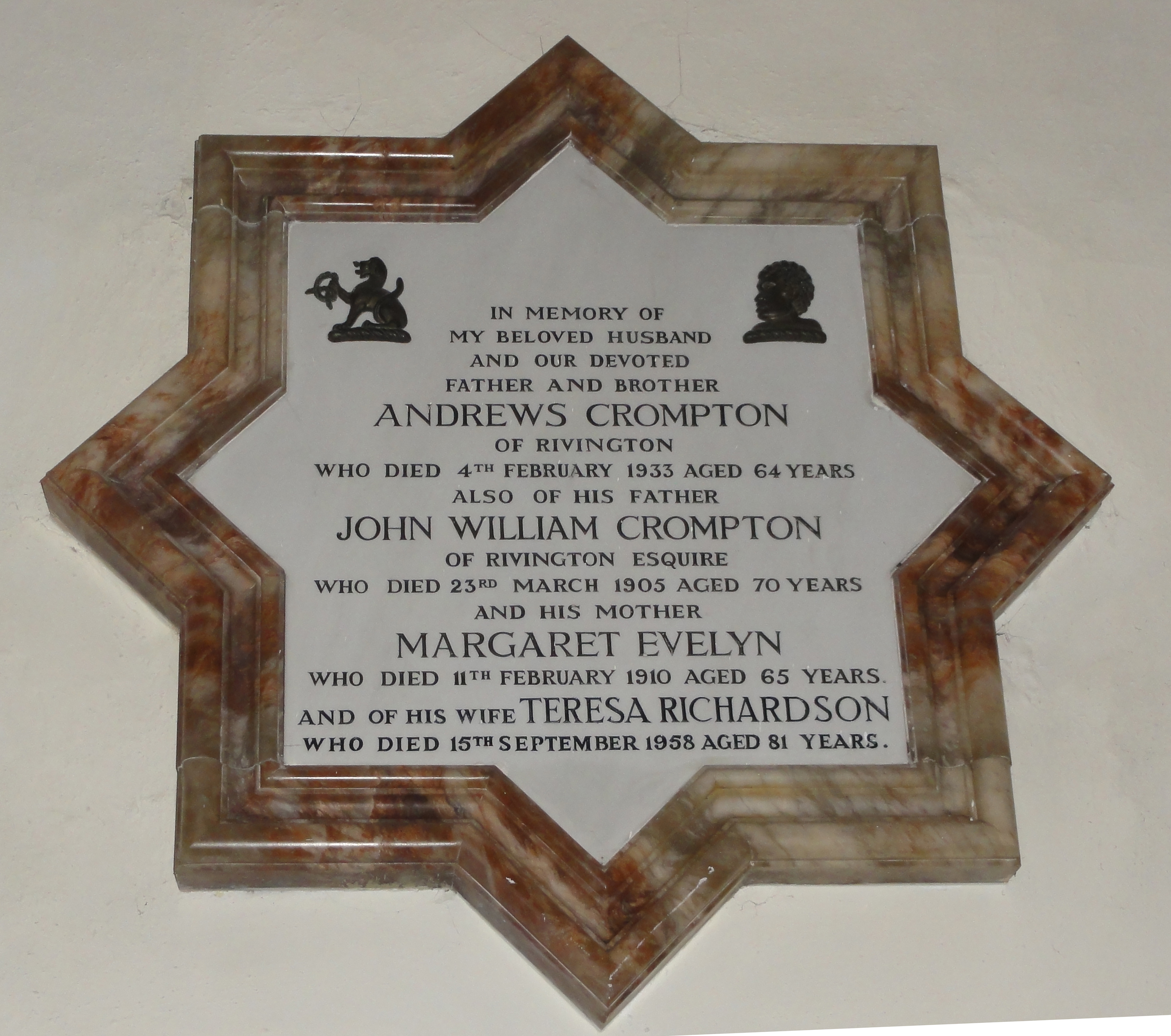
Crompton memorial, interior south wall

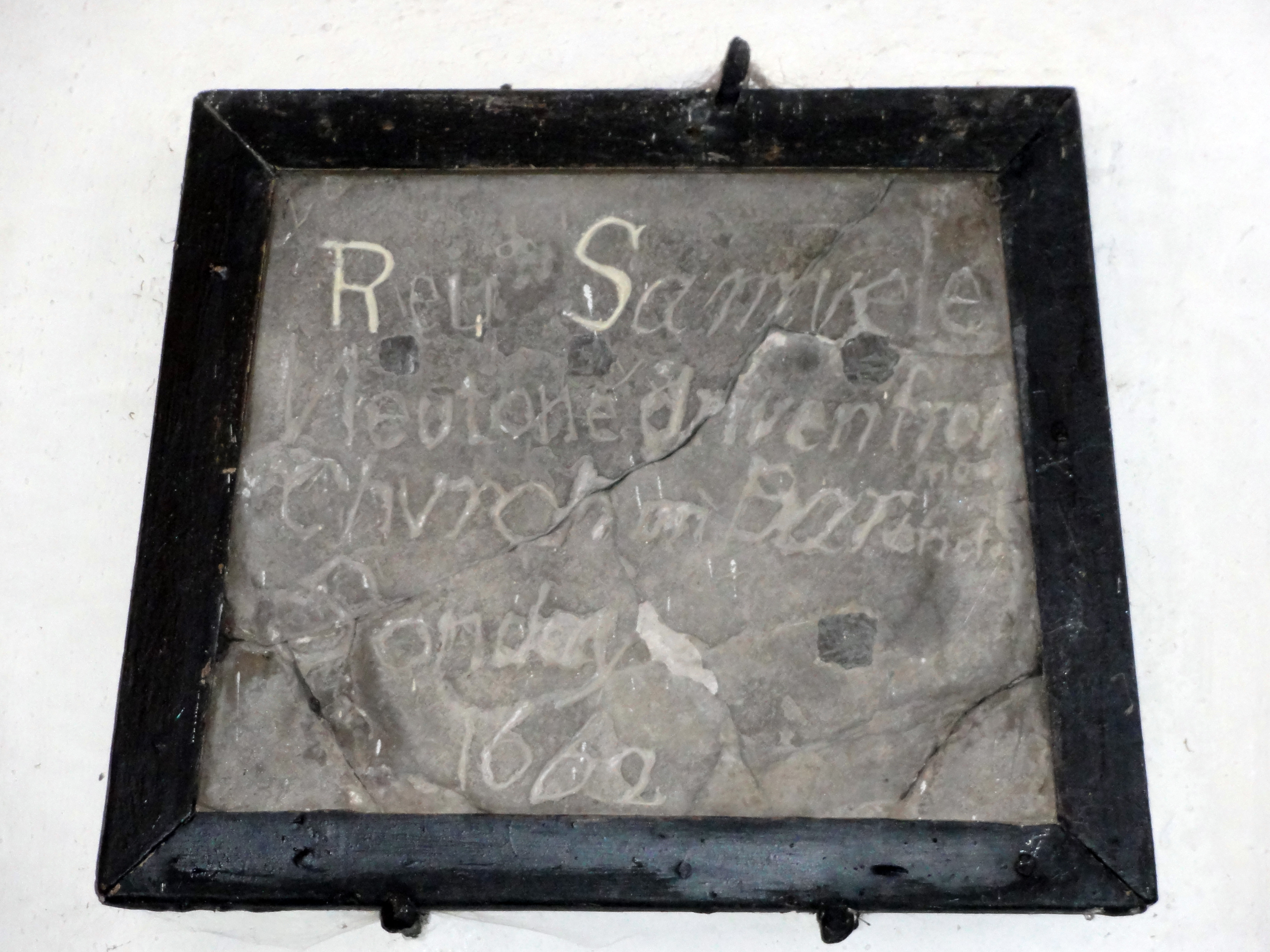
Newton plaque, interior south wall

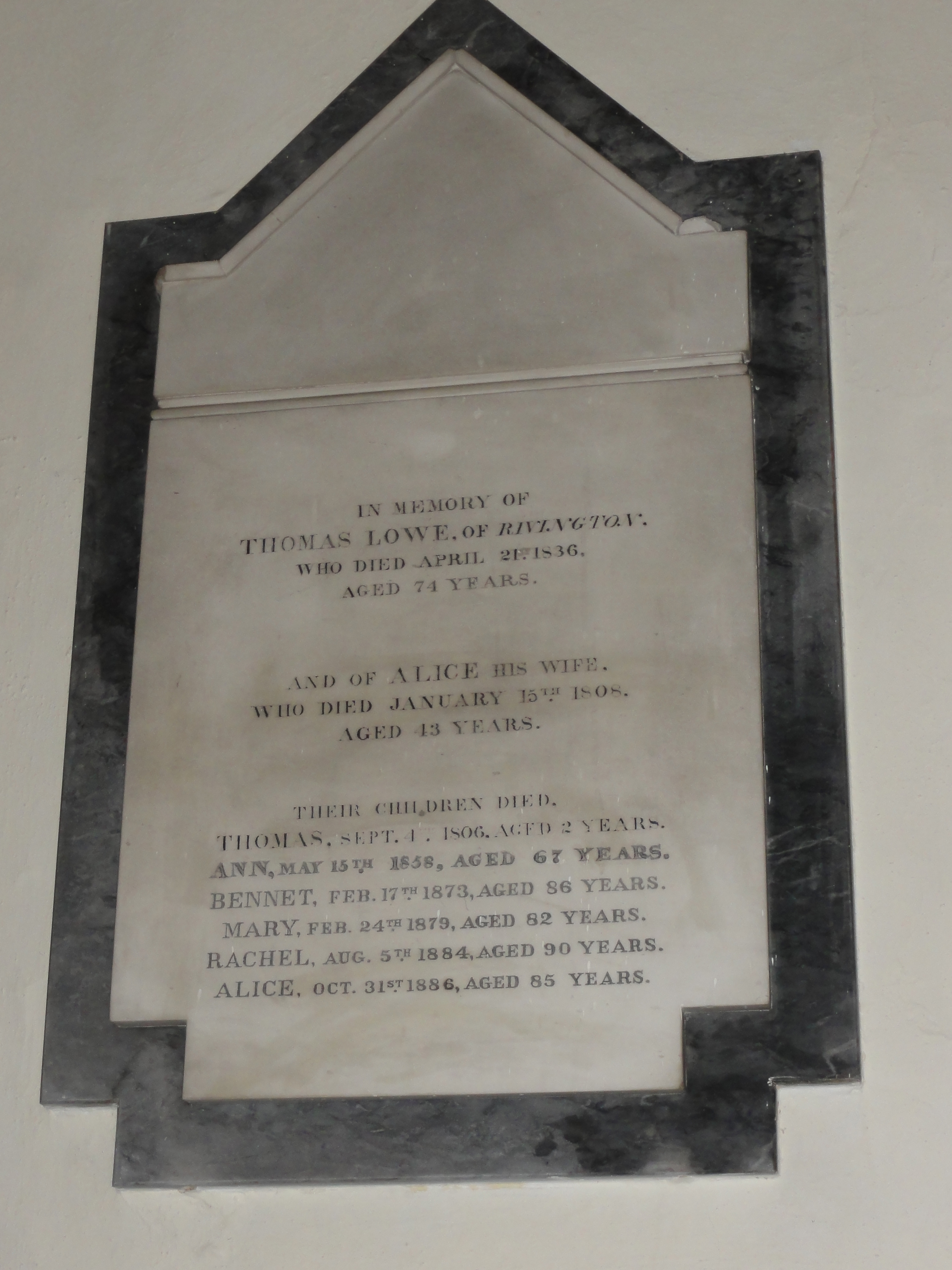
Lowe memorial, interior north wall

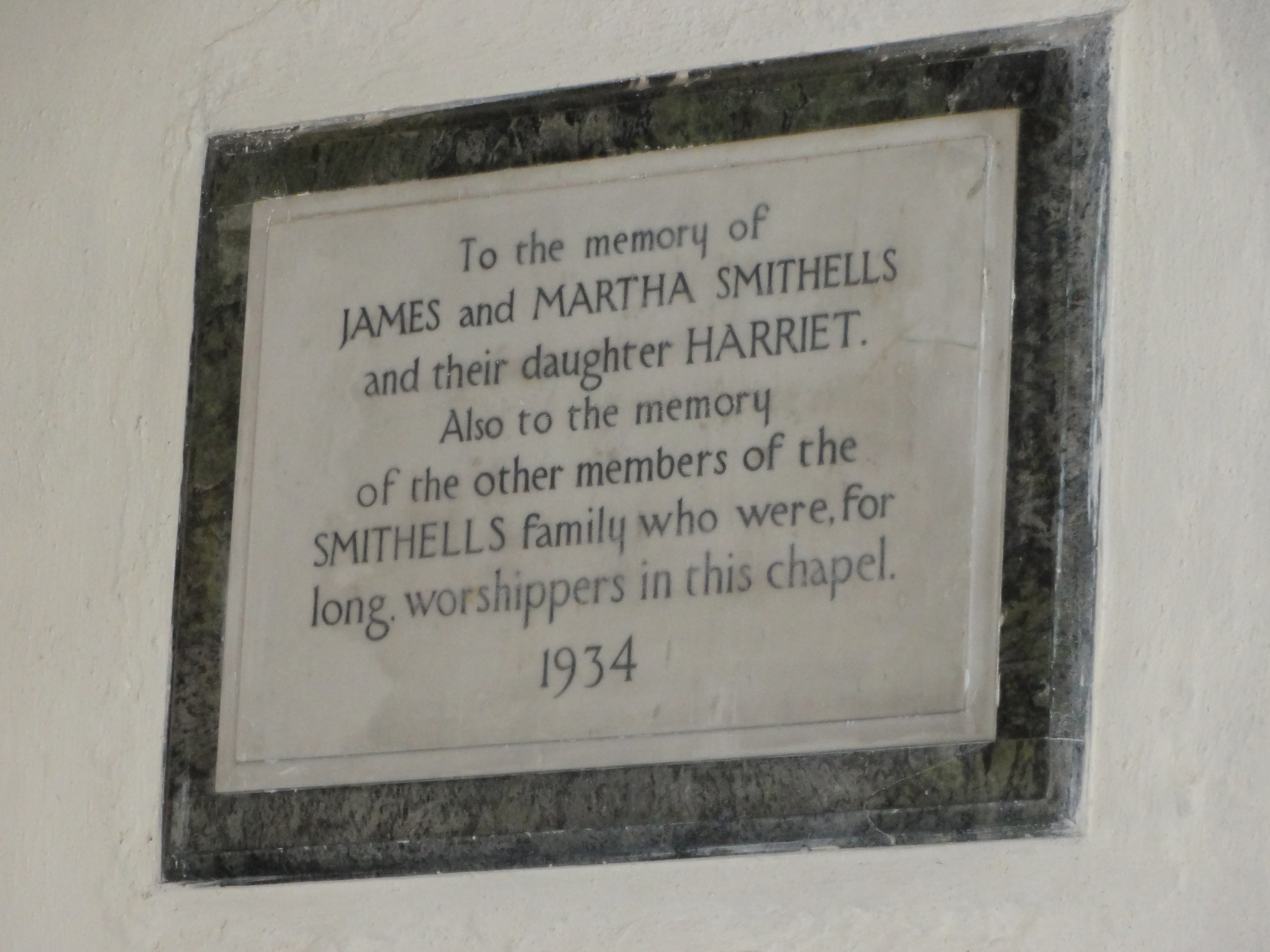
Smithells memorial, interior west wall

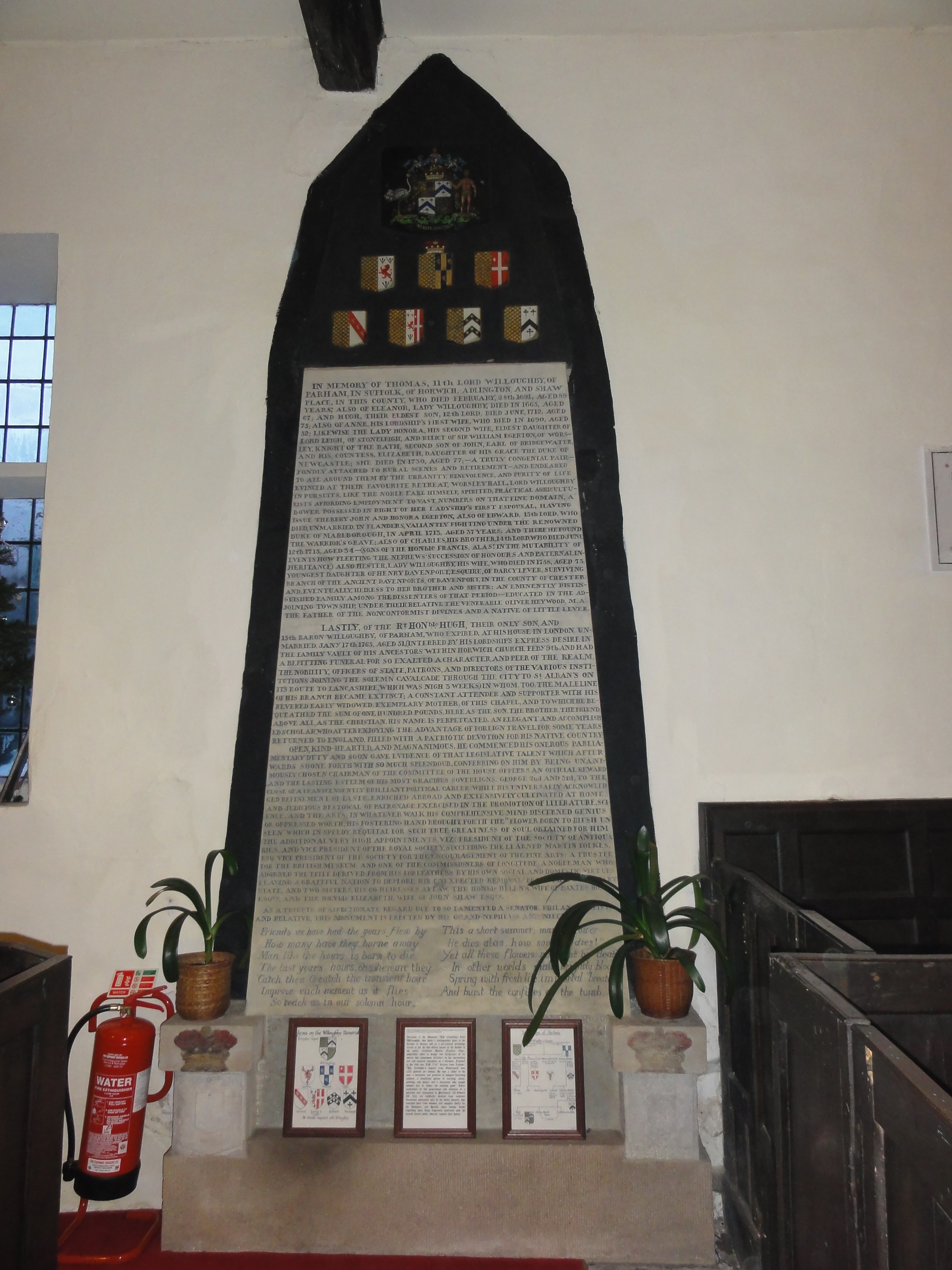
Monument to Barons Willoughby of Parham, north wall

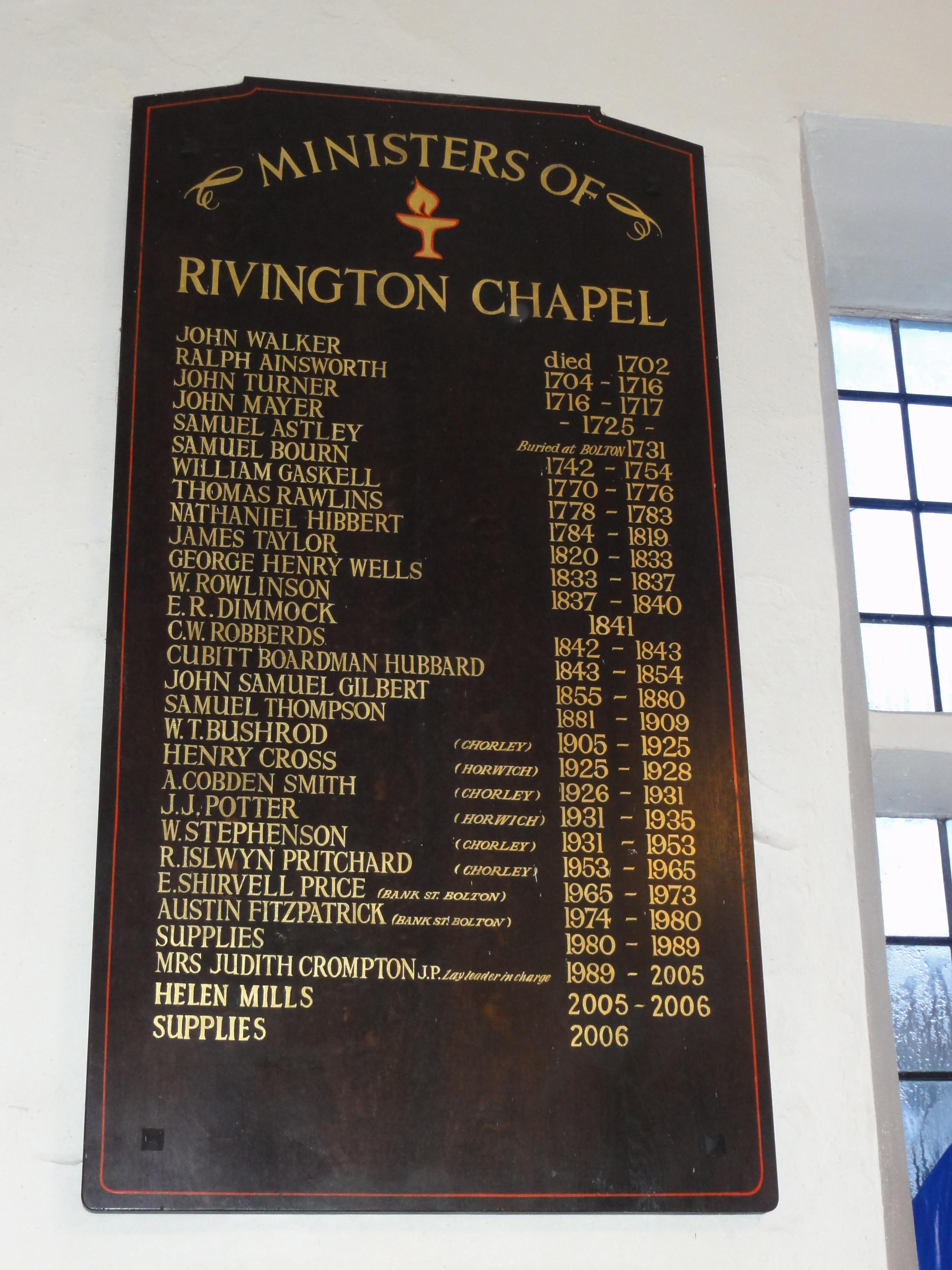
List of ministers, interior north wall

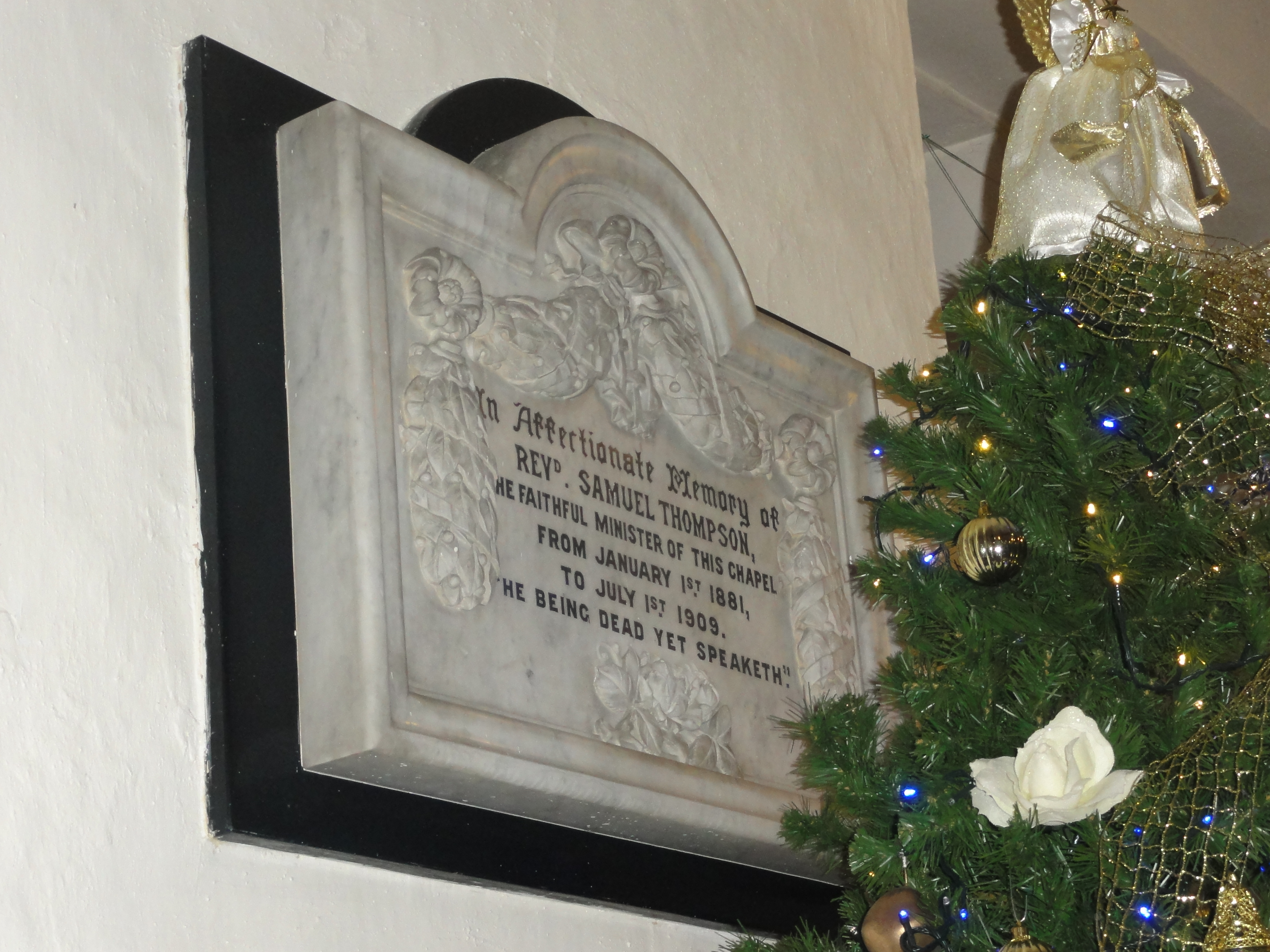
Memorial to Rev Samuel Thompson interior of Rivington Chapel

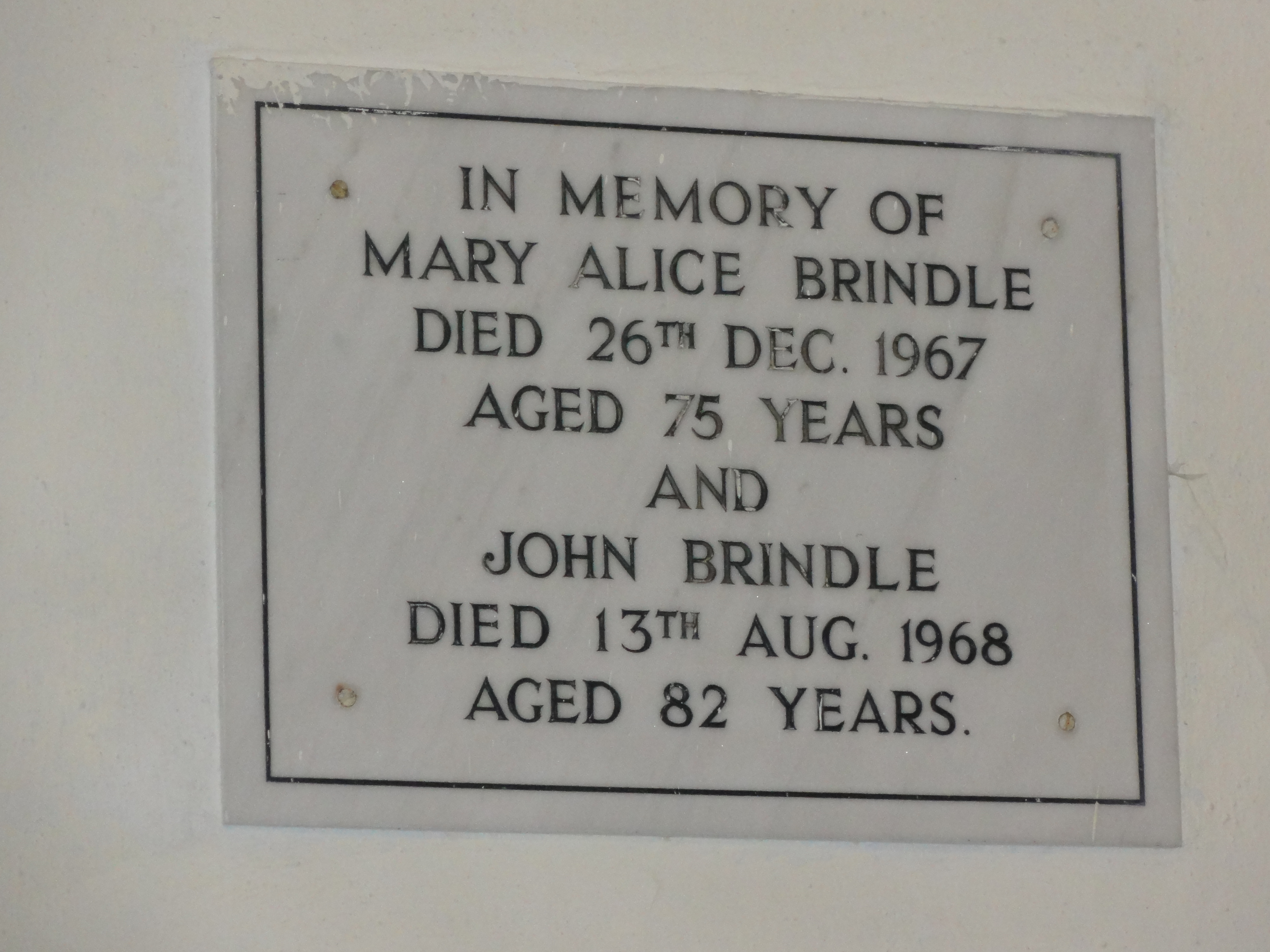
Memorial to Alice Brindle at Unitarian Chapel Rivington

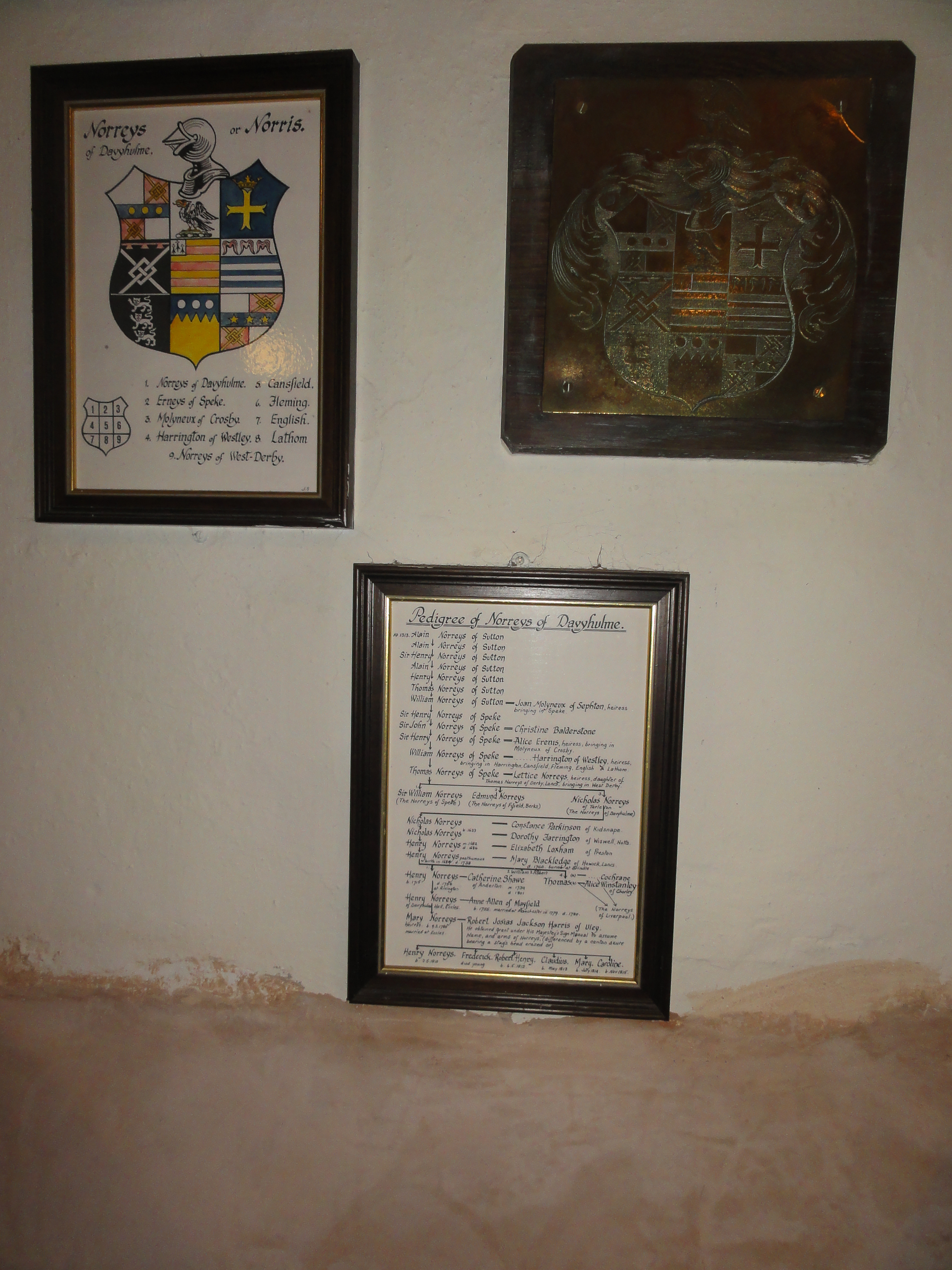
Norrey family memorial inside Rivington Unitarian Chapel

== Bibliography ==
- Croston, James (1883), Historic sites of Lancashire and Cheshire, Society of Antiquaries
- Farrer, William; Brownbill, J, eds. (1911). Rivington. British History Online.
- Hampson, Thomas (1883). Horwich: its history, legends, and church. Wigan: Wall, Printer "Observer" Office.
- Hampson, Thomas (1893). History of Rivington: with lists of the clergy and churchwardens. Wigan: Roger and Rennick.
- Holding, Joan; Rogers, Colin D., eds. (1988). The Nonconformist chapel in Rivington, Lancashire and its early registers. Manchester: J. Holding. (The book may be viewed at the Lancashire Records Office, references URI 1/7 & URI 1/8. Copies available for viewing at the chapel).
- Irvine, William Fergusson (1904). A short history of the township of Rivington. Edinburgh: Ballantyne Press.
- Kay, Margaret M. (1966). The History of Rivington and Blackrod Grammar School (2nd ed.). Manchester University Press.
- Rawlinson, John (1969), About Rivington, Nelson
- Salveson, Paul (2008). With Walt Whitman in Bolton. Huddersfield: Little Northern Books. ISBN 978-0-9559171-0-3.
- Shaw, Ronald Cunliffe (1940). The Records of a Lancashire Family from the XIIth to the XXth Century. [On the Shaw family. With plates and genealogical tables.] Preston: Guardian Press.
- Smith, M.D. (1989). Rivington, Lancashire. Chorley: Nelson Brothers Printers Limited. ISBN 0-9508772-8-X.
