= Swan Hotel, Bolton =

Listed pub in Greater Manchester, England

Swan Hotel
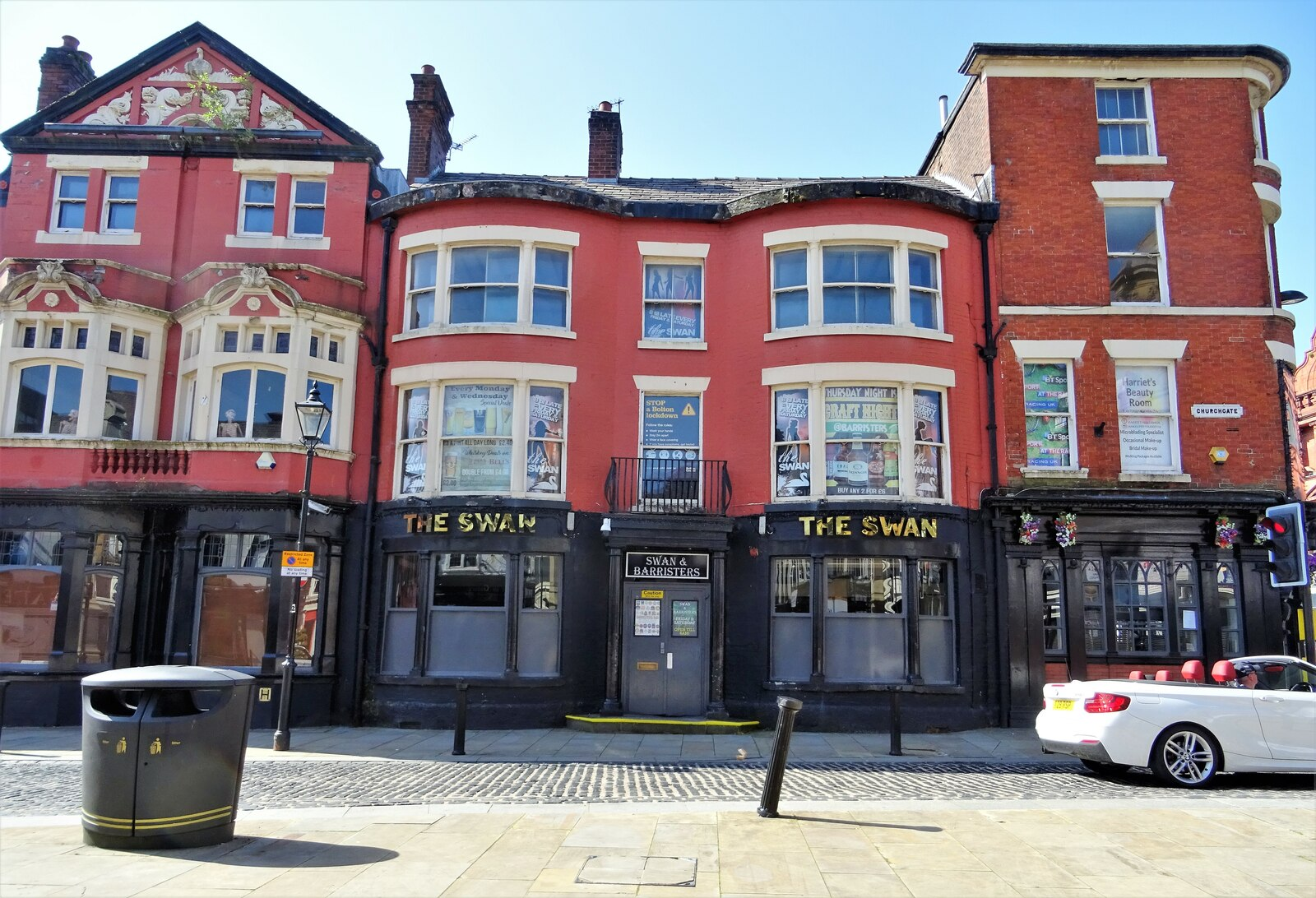
- The pub, seen from Churchgate in 2021

- Location within Greater Manchester
- Alternative names: The Swan and Barristers

General information
- Type: Public house; originally a hotel
- Location: 2–4 Churchgate, Bolton, Greater Manchester, England
- Coordinates: 53.5795°N 2.4266°W
- Year built: 1845; 181 years ago

Design and construction
- Designations

Listed Building – Grade II
- Official name: The Swan Hotel
- Designated: 23 April 1952
- Reference no.: 1387974

The Swan Hotel (currently trading as The Swan and Barristers) is a Grade II listed public house at the corner of Churchgate and Bradshawgate in Bolton, Greater Manchester, England. According to its official listing, the building developed in four main phases between about 1800 and around 1900, with possible remnants of an earlier structure, while the Campaign for Real Ale (CAMRA) gives a construction date of 1845. It was shown as a hotel on late 19th‑century Ordnance Survey maps. Plans to demolish the building in 1990 were withdrawn following local opposition, and it reopened in 1992 with several themed bars. The Swan stands directly beside Ye Olde Man & Scythe, another Grade II-listed pub on Churchgate.

== History ==
The building was constructed in four main phases between about 1800 and around 1900, with possible remnants of an earlier structure, according to its official listing. The Campaign for Real Ale (CAMRA) gives a construction date of 1845.

The 1893 Ordnance Survey map marks the building as a hotel with no attributed name, while the 1910 and 1947 editions identify it as the Swan Hotel. On 23 April 1952, the Swan Hotel was designated a Grade II listed building.

In 1990 plans were submitted to demolish the building and replace it with shops, offices and a new pub. Bolton Civic Trust objected and the proposal was withdrawn. The Swan reopened in 1992 with several themed bars, including Swannies, the Malt and Hops Bar and the Buttery Bar.

The Swan forms part of a short run of historic buildings on Churchgate, standing directly next to the Grade II-listed Olde Man & Scythe.

== Architecture ==
=== Exterior ===
The earliest part of the complex is a separate building facing Churchgate, with later phases forming distinct structures on either side. It is painted brick with a slate roof, three storeys and three front windows, and a central doorway in a small porch. Tall shallow bow windows flank the entrance, running the full height of the front. All windows are two‑pane sashes. Above the doorway is a renewed window, probably enlarged to give access to a small balcony over the porch, with another sash window above. A chimney stands just left of the entrance.

Facing Bradshawgate is another early 19th‑century building. It has three storeys, six front windows, an entrance on the left, and an arched opening to an inner courtyard slightly right of centre. The doorway and the larger sash windows above it have shaped surrounds. To the right is a two‑window section with two‑pane sashes on the lower floors and smaller nine‑pane sashes in the attic. A tall central window sits above the carriage entry, with a three‑part sash window above. A later public‑house frontage occupies the ground floor beyond the archway, with two sash windows above. All windows have flat brick heads and stone sills. Chimneys rise at the ends and along the front, and the roof has overhanging eaves.

The Churchgate and Bradshawgate buildings are linked by a curved corner block dating from about 1850. It has three storeys and five windows, with an entrance in the curved corner framed by a surround and a small bracketed canopy, probably added around 1900. Above are four‑pane sash windows, the first‑floor window partly obscured by the inn sign. A continuous sill band runs across the second floor. The returns to both streets have two‑pane sashes, with a later public‑house frontage at ground level. The roof has a moulded cornice.

A further building was added around 1900 to the left of the Churchgate range. It is painted brick, has three storeys, with two front windows. The lower floors have canted bay windows divided by pilasters and topped by an ornate pediment. The top floor has paired two‑pane sashes, and the gable above is decorated with scrollwork and a carved swan at the apex. Additional late 19th and 20th-century extensions continue to the rear.

=== Interior ===
There are two separate bars that share the same cellar. The usual entrances are in the passageway between the two Bradshawgate fronts. The bar currently known as Barristers has a wood‑panelled interior and is decorated to create a traditional, relaxed pub atmosphere.

== See also ==
- Listed buildings in Bolton
- Listed pubs in Greater Manchester
