= Rivington Church =

Anglican parish church in Rivington, Lancashire, England

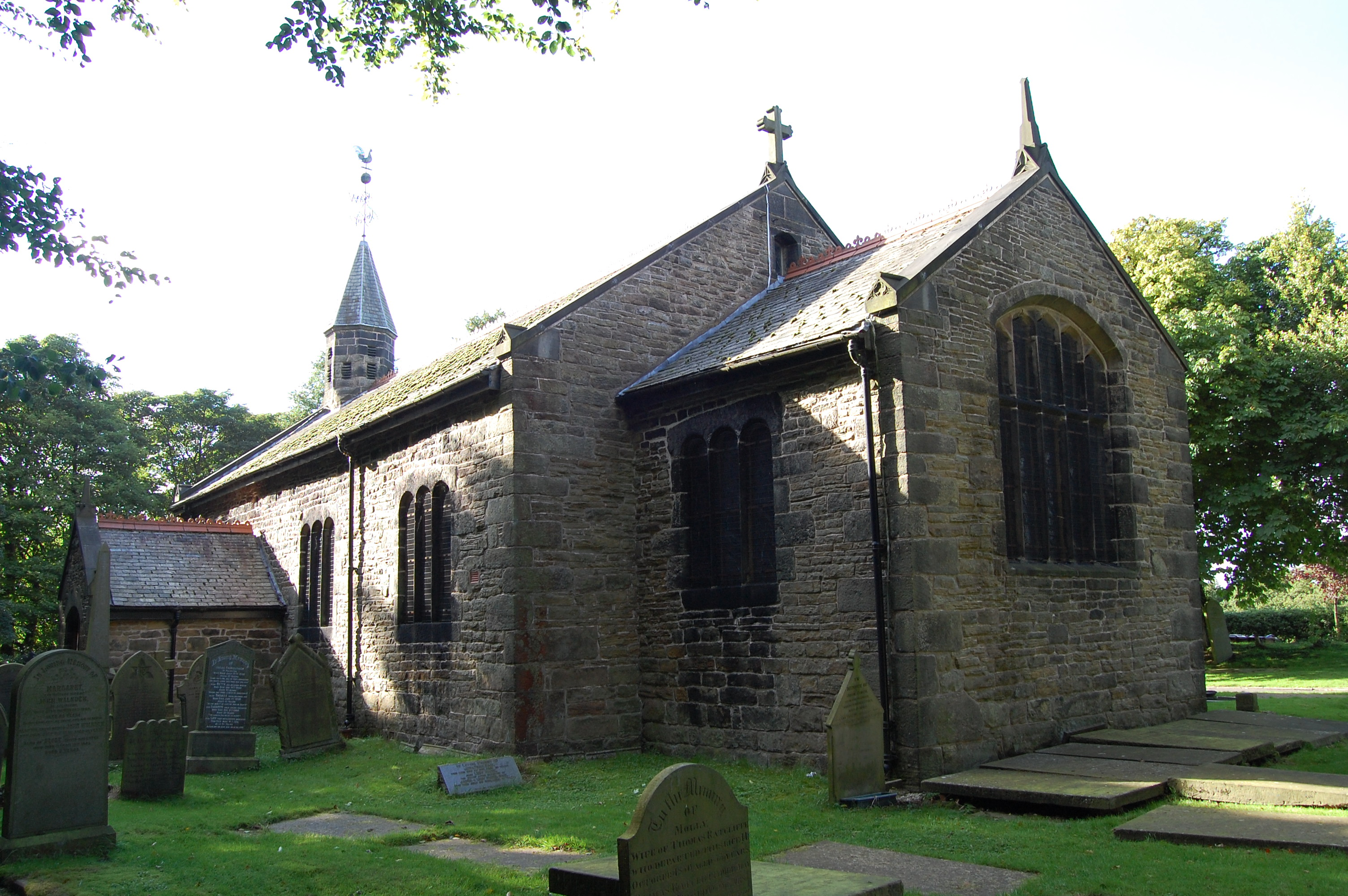
- Rivington Church

- Position of the church in the Borough of Chorley
- 53.6252°N 2.5684°W
- OS grid reference: SD 62498 14442
- Location: Rivington, Lancashire, England
- Country: England
- Denomination: Anglican
- Website: Rivington Parish Church

History
- Founded: 1566

Architecture
- Functional status: Active
- Heritage designation: Grade II Listed building

Specifications
- Materials: Sandstone

Administration
- Diocese: Diocese of Manchester
- Archdeaconry: Bolton
- Deanery: Deane
- Parish: Rivington

Rivington Church is an active Anglican parish church in Rivington, Lancashire, England. It is in the Deane deanery, the Bolton archdeanery and Diocese of Manchester. The church has been designated a Grade II listed building. The church has no patron saint and is not named after a saint or martyr. It has been variously called St Lawrence, St George, Holy Trinity, and St Catherine but its correct title is Rivington Church.

== History ==
A deed of 1280 mentions three acres of "terra ecclesiastical" in Rivington. The Church land was located close to the Horwich border, named in a grant between Cecily Worsley and Adam Dorant. A Saxon font, found in the locality, is housed in the church's Millennium Room. The church has a circular graveyard which is typical of churches of early foundation. That, and the Saxon font, may be proof of pre-Conquest foundation. The arched windows on the south side are cut from solid stone, a Saxon feature.

At the enclosure of the manorial waste in 1536, the priest was given 30 acres (12 ha).Richard Pilkington, whose son became the Bishop of Durham, appealed to Doctor Bird, the Bishop of Chester, to dedicate the chapel and chapelyard. They were consecrated in October 1541. At the consecration, the village residents stated on oath they had worshipped at the site for generations. Queen Elizabeth I, at the petition of Bishop Pilkington in 1566, granted letters patent for a free grammar school and licence to provide a curate or minister and allow baptisms, marriages and burials at the church for the inhabitants of Rivington, Anglezarke, Hemshaws and Foulds. Before this time the inhabitants had to travel to the surrounding parishes.

The Reverend Samuel Newton was ejected from the church on "Bartholemew Sunday" in 1662 and most probably the staunchly Puritan congregation followed him and many became Presbyterian. This event led to the eventual founding of Rivington Unitarian Chapel.

The church remains primarily as rebuilt in 1666 with alterations and restoration in the late-19th century. The restoration in 1861 cost £500 and involved building an "inward-jutting porch" to the west entrance, laying Minton tiles in centre aisle, raising the altar and adding railings, restoring the rood screen, panelling the walls to a height of five feet, replacing the box pews and installing a small organ.

Rivington was created a parish out of the ancient ecclesiastical parish of Bolton le Moors. In 1856, and at their own cost, and by a privilege that few churches in the country possessed, the parishioners were able to elect their own minister.

In 2014 an extension was added to the church's west end providing a reception and display area, toilet and kitchen.

== Structure ==
=== Exterior ===
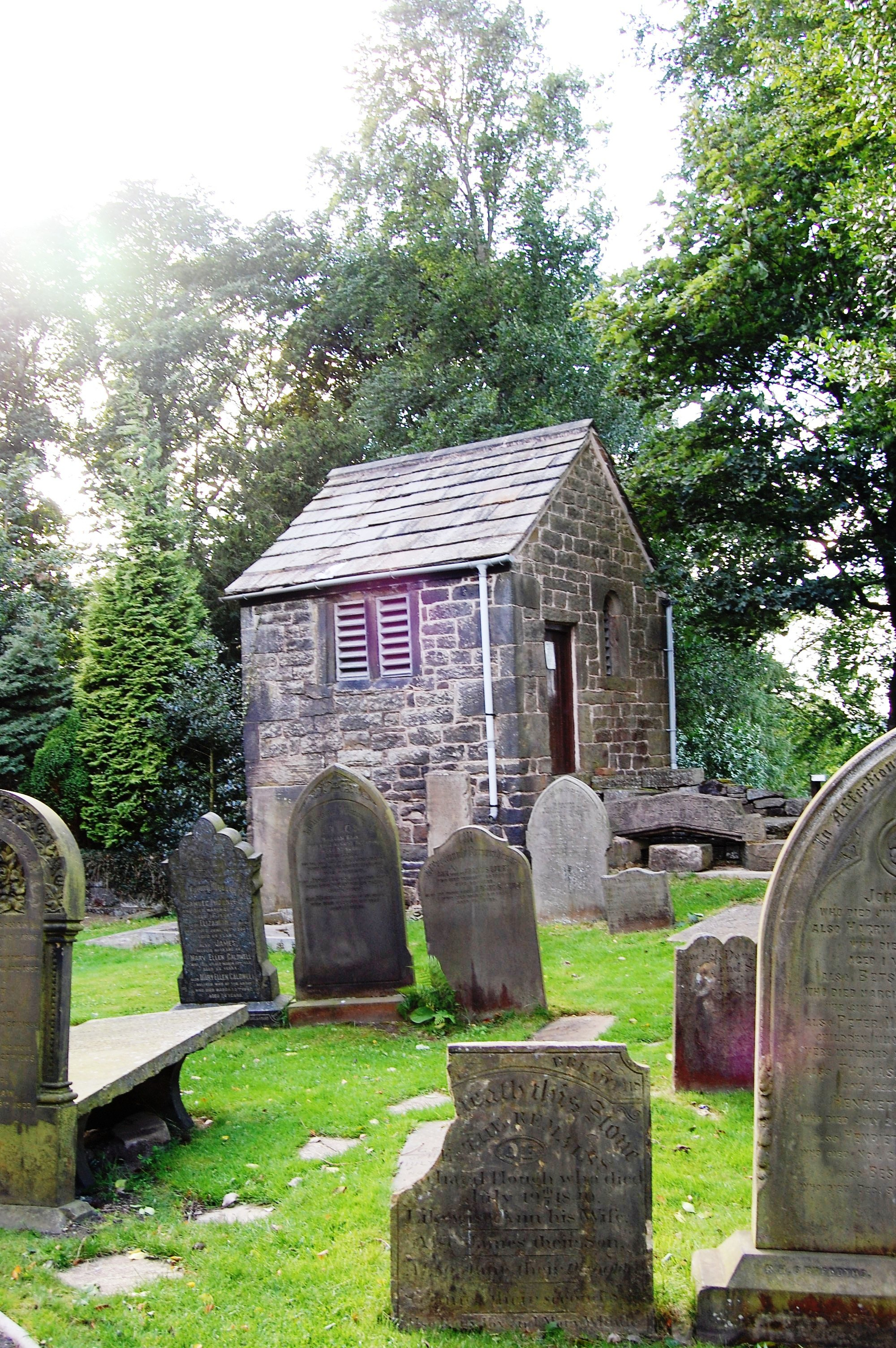

The church is built of irregularly coursed sandstone with large quoins, some measuring five feet, at the corners and a slate roof. It is a small, plain building with three three-light windows on each side. The nave is 55 feet 6 inches in length by 27 feet 6 inches in width and the chancel, 13 feet 6 inches by 15 feet 6 inches.

The gabled porch is between the centre and western windows on the south side and a modern vestry is on north side. The entrance was moved and alteration to make a porch was work done in the 19th century, with a large chimney once towering over where the current doorway is. The west gable wall has an elliptical-headed doorway and the octagonal bell turret has a square base and a conical roof with a weather vane. The roof is covered with green slates and finished with overhanging eaves.

The three-bay nave has square-headed windows of three square lights on the north side, and round heads on the south side. There is a doorway between the second and third windows from the east on each side and a door at the west end. The chancel has three round-headed lights in each side and a five light east window.

In the graveyard, the earliest gravestone is marked 1616. Some graves stones still present now laid flat at ground level were in the nineteenth century raised with stones sides and some other slabs originally laid at ground level were once surrounded by wrought iron railings, The iron was removed for the war effort in World War II. The churchyard contains three Commonwealth war grave burials of British Army personnel, one of World War I and two of World War II.

Stones near the entrance include the 'Anderton Stone' which depicts shack bolts from the Anderton coat of arms and a crucified figure with 'INRI' believed to originate from Anderton Hall chapel. Above it is a carved with a Sator Square reading "SATOR AREPO TENET OPERA ROTAS" which possibly predates the Christian era.

=== Interior ===
The roof has four collar trusses with bracing to tie-beams and collars. The church is furnished with a late-medieval oak screen and a late 16th-century octagonal, oak pulpit on a stem with two linen-fold panels in each side. The screen and pulpit are considered to predate the church building. On the north wall is a genealogical painting copied, in 1835, from a 16th-century painting relating to the Pilkington family which was damaged by fire in 1834. There is an 18th-century brass chandelier with fluted body and two tiers of arms. The earliest memorial in the church is dated 1627.

The church contains a pipe organ by Lewis & Co dating from 1884. It was overhauled in 1927 by Jardine and Co.

==== War memorial ====
The war memorial here reads, 'To the Glory of God And in Memory of the Men who fell in the Great War 1914.1919'

- John Wm Bain
- Ed. Berry
- Ed Berry
- Nathan Birchall
- T Birchall
- John Edward Berchall
- Ryder Doman
- Jas Edwards
- Wm Evans
- George Edwards
- Roland Foster
- Wm Farnworth
- Herbert Hitchen
- John King
- Asa Leadbetter
- John Parry
- Eric Pierce
- Eustace Blackburn Ritson
- Thos Ratcliffe
- Francis (Frank) Smith
- Jas Schofield
- Benjamin Webster

1939–1945

- William Almond
- Albert Gaunt
- Wm Gordon Ratcliffe
- William Spinks

== Belltower ==
The belltower, a Grade II Listed building in the churchyard close to the church, is a small, square, single-storey building with a basement and outside steps built in sandstone with a stone slate roof. It was built to hold a large bell bought from All Saints' Church, Wigan in 1542. The bell was sold by church commissioners around 1551. The detached bellhouse, the only such structure in Lancashire, was used as a charnel house but is now used as a tool house by the sexton and grave digger.
