= Essex in Ireland =

1599 military campaign in Ireland

Essex's 1599 Irish campaign
- Part of the Nine Years' War (Ireland)
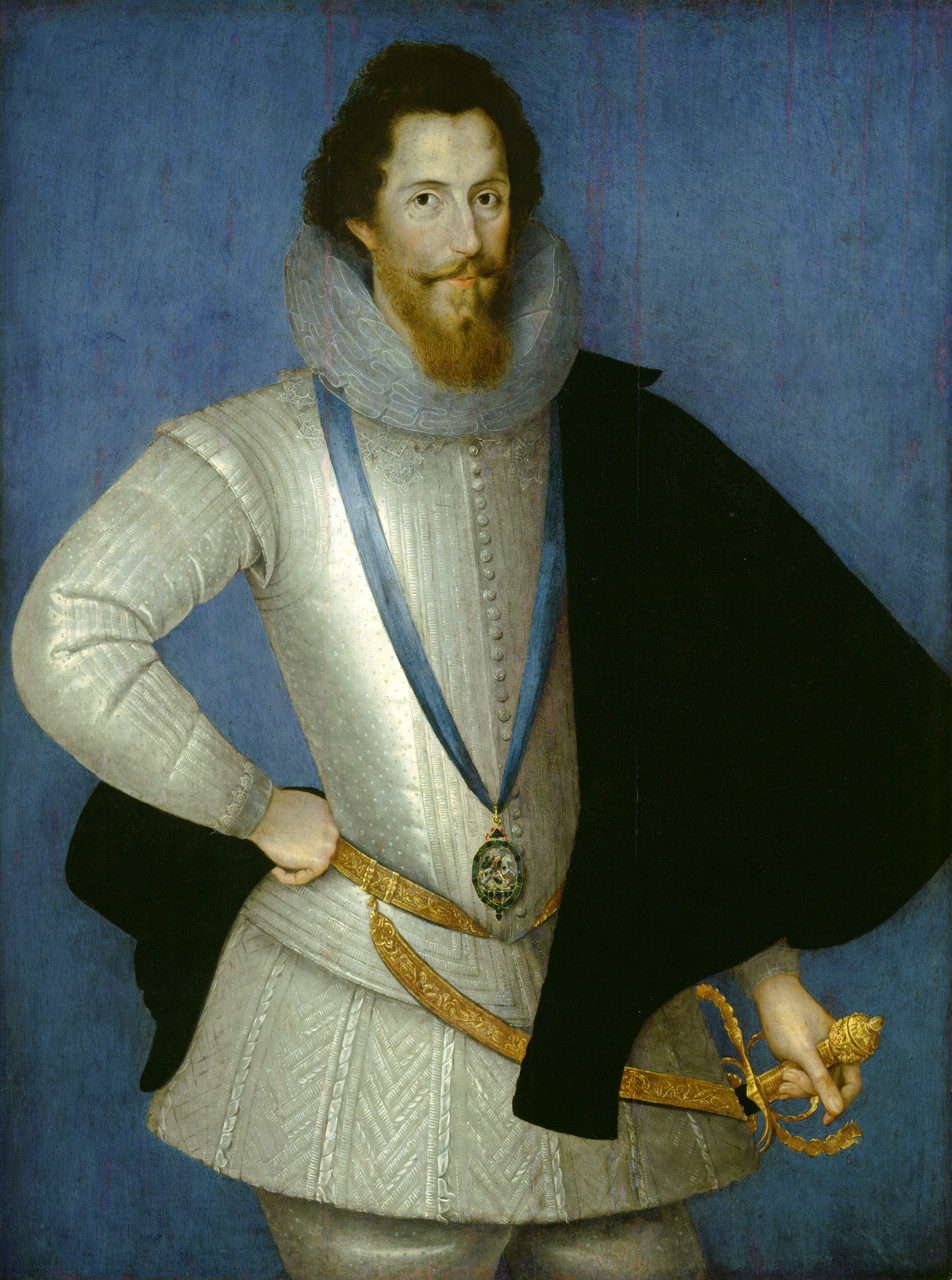
- Portrait of Robert Devereux, 2nd Earl of Essex, who served as Lord Lieutenant of Ireland in 1599
Date	1599
Location	Ireland
Result	Irish confederate victory

Belligerents
Kingdom of England	Gaelic Ireland

Commanders and leaders
Robert Devereux, 2nd Earl of Essex; Conyers Clifford	Hugh O'Neill, Earl of Tyrone; Hugh Roe O'Donnell

The Irish military campaign of Robert Devereux, 2nd Earl of Essex, took place in 1599, against the confederacy of Irish lords during the Nine Years' War (1593–1603). Essex served as Lord Lieutenant of Ireland; despite his commission representing the largest English army ever dispatched to Ireland, the campaign ended in failure and Essex was removed from his post.

Essex was a charismatic English courtier who became Queen Elizabeth I's royal favourite around 1587. He advocated for military intervention on behalf of Protestant forces in continental Europe and Ireland, which brought him into conflict with the queen's principal adviser, Lord Burghley, and his son, statesman Robert Cecil. Essex's insolent behaviour during disputes over military policy in Ireland damaged his special relationship with the queen. The Irish confederacy's victory at the Battle of the Yellow Ford in August 1598 left no clear leadership of the English-led Irish administration. In December, Elizabeth selected Essex as Lord Lieutenant of Ireland; he reluctantly accepted and saw this as an opportunity to restore his reputation.

Essex landed in Ireland on 15 April 1599. The queen had ordered him to confront confederate leader Hugh O'Neill, Earl of Tyrone, in Ulster, but Essex instead led his army into southern Ireland where he fought skirmishes of little consequence. The Battle of Deputy's Pass and the Battle of Curlew Pass, fought on 29 May and 15 August respectively, inflicted heavy casualties on the royal forces despite their superior numbers. Many royal soldiers died from sickness and in battle.

In late August, Essex marched northwards to confront Tyrone, having been heavily berated by Elizabeth. He was now outnumbered by Tyrone's army and accepted an informal six week truce in a parley with Tyrone on 7 September. Essex returned to England later that month, hoping to strengthen his rapport with Elizabeth in person, despite her explicit orders that he should remain in Ireland. Essex was quickly placed under house arrest and removed from his post. His distress at his failed campaign and tarnished reputation led to a complete emotional collapse. In February 1601, Essex led a failed coup against the Crown and was arrested, tried for treason, and executed by beheading at the Tower of London.

== Background ==
The Tudor conquest of Ireland began in 1542 when the Kingdom of Ireland was established as an English client state. Various Irish clans accepted English sovereignty under the procedure "surrender and regrant". From 1573, English nobleman Walter Devereux, 1st Earl of Essex, was involved in a scheme to colonise Ireland's northern province of Ulster. One of his key allies was prominent Irish lord Hugh O'Neill, Earl of Tyrone, who supported the English Crown. Walter died in September 1576; his ten-year-old son Robert Devereux succeeded him as 2nd Earl of Essex. Essex inherited claims to lands at Farney, County Monaghan and at Islandmagee, County Antrim, as well as to fishing rights on the River Bann, but these went unexploited as he did not take much interest in Ireland. Essex's stepfather, the Earl of Leicester, imbued in him a feeling of common cause with Protestants in continental Europe.

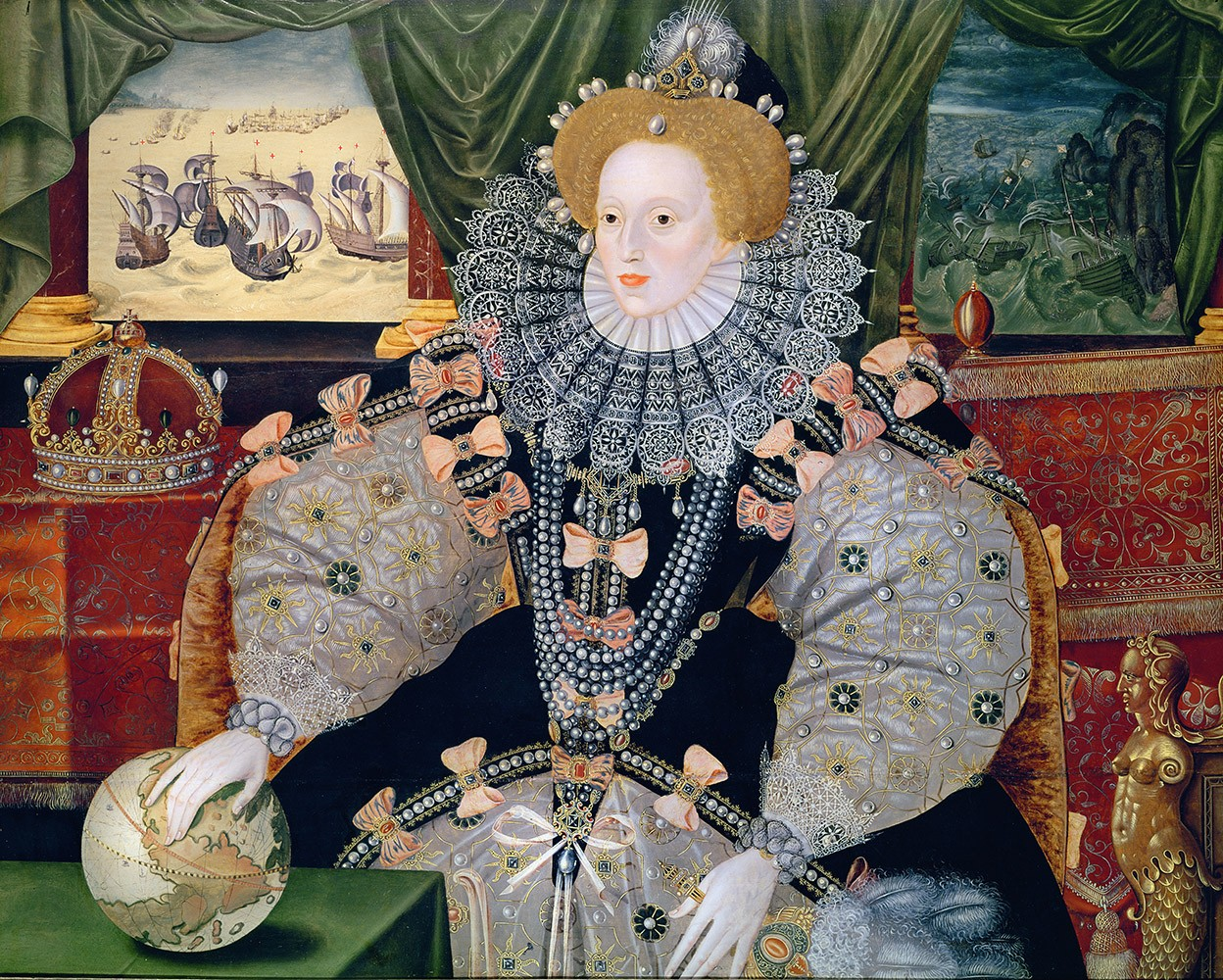
Essex was a royal favourite of Elizabeth I, Queen of England.

Essex visited the English royal court in 1585. Known for his looks and charisma, by May 1587 he had become Queen Elizabeth I's royal favourite. Throughout the entire summer they were observed riding and walking together. Despite his privileged position, Essex was ambivalent about his career as a courtier. He considered military service the highest form of royal service and consistently angled for these opportunities, hoping this would merit him further reward from the queen. From 1588 to 1597 he sporadically served in the Anglo-Spanish War against Catholic Spain, often against the queen's will. He pushed an offensive strategy, supporting the Dutch rebels and French Huguenots against their Catholic adversaries.

By the early 1590s, widespread resentment against English rule developed amongst the Gaelic nobility, due to the execution of Gaelic lords, the pillaging of settlements by appointed sheriffs and Catholic persecution. From 1593, Tyrone supported a confederacy of Irish lords in militarily resisting English incursions on their territory. The Nine Years' War was one of Elizabethan England's most significant conflicts. Essex supported William Russell's appointment as Lord Deputy of Ireland in 1594, and he may have supported Thomas Burgh's appointment in 1597.

== Appointment of Essex ==
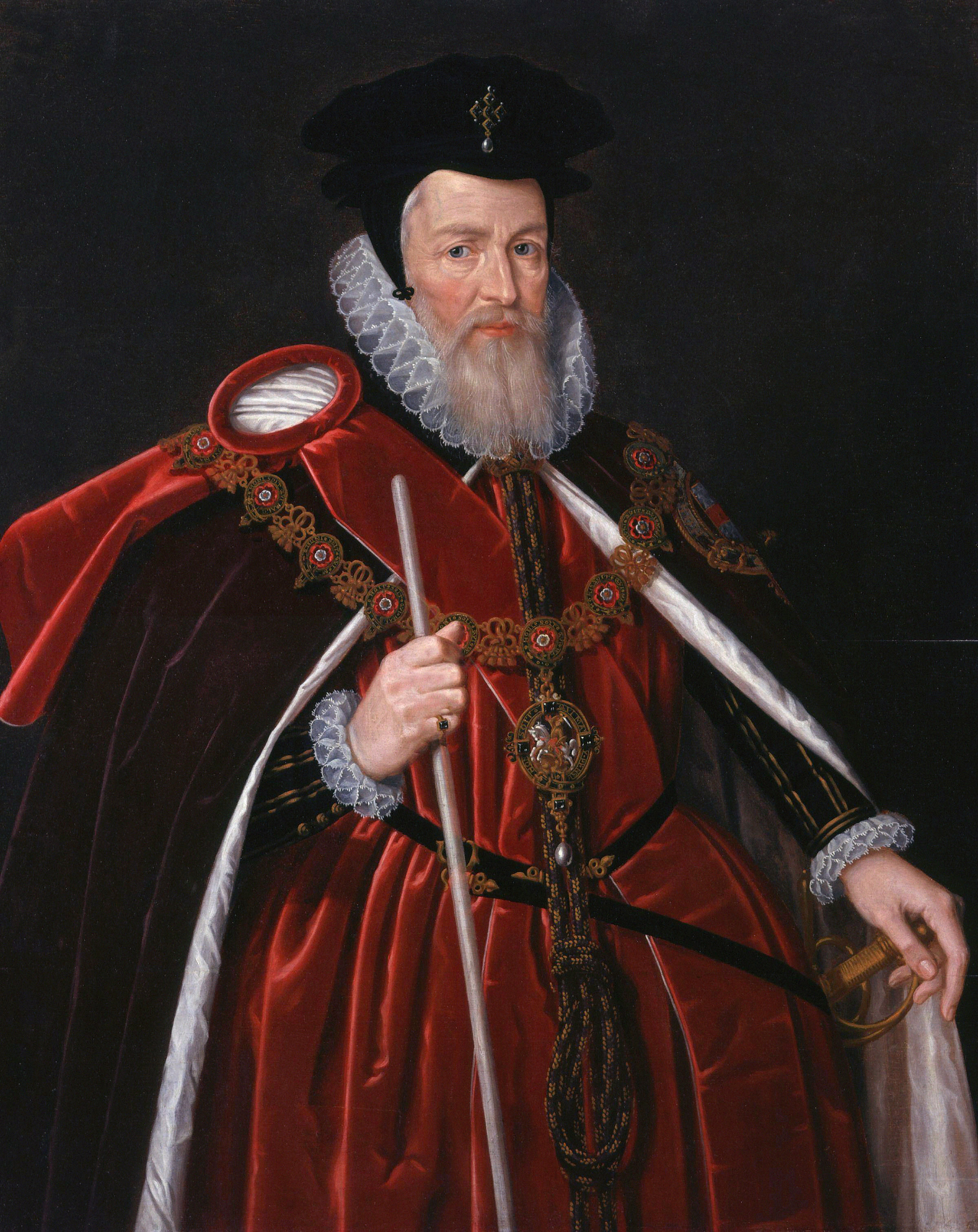
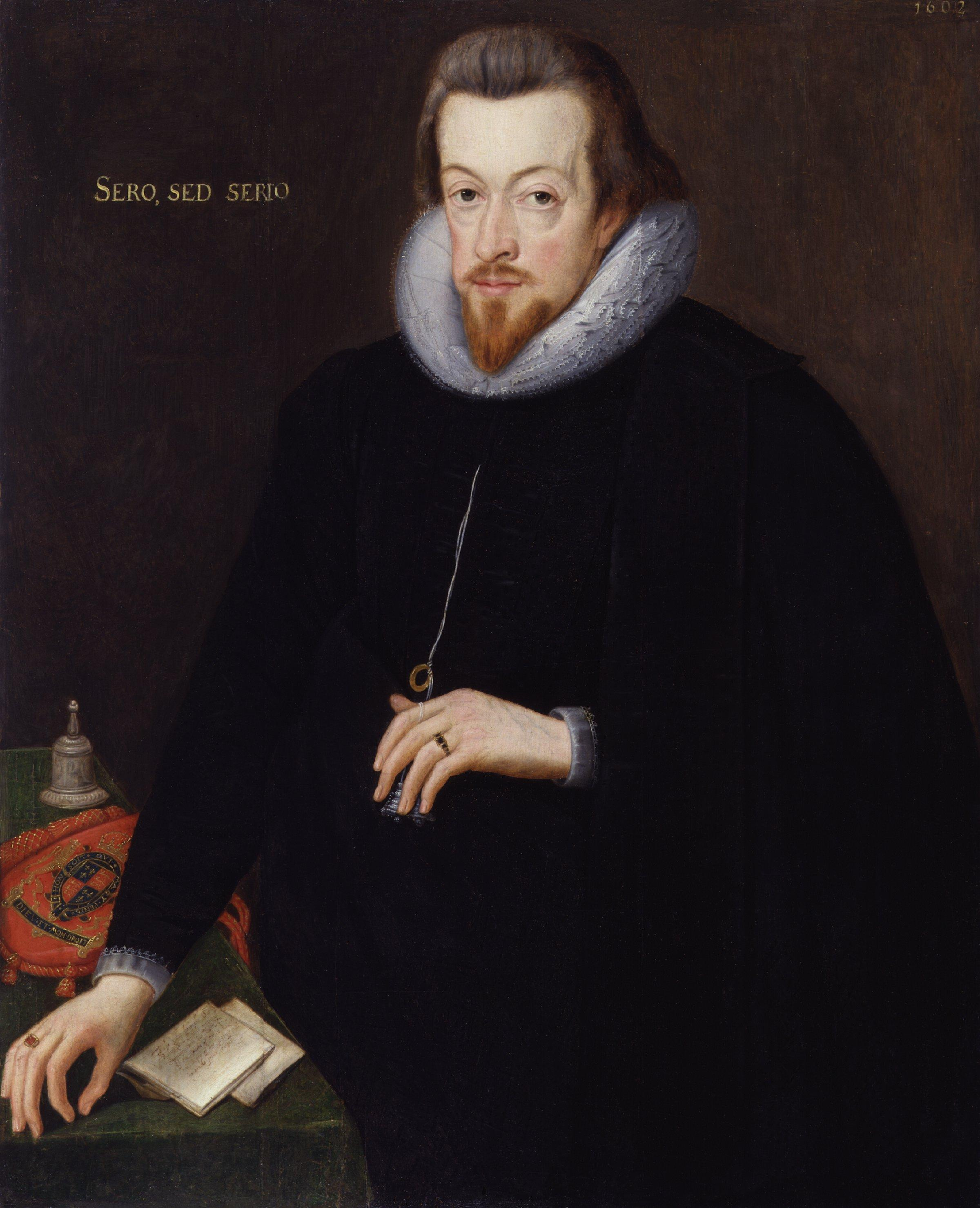
Lord Burghley (left) and his son Robert Cecil were political rivals to Essex at court.

In early 1598, Essex's advisor Francis Bacon advised him to advocate for a leadership role in the Irish government. Essex subsequently took interest in Ireland's political situation but he clearly did not want any involvement with the country's politics, as there were few accolades he could earn from service in Ireland. Burgh died in October 1597, and Essex confined himself in his capacity as Earl Marshall of England to merely suggesting individuals to the vacant post of Lord Deputy. Many potential candidates for the post saw it as a poor career move; Walter Raleigh, Robert Sidney and Christopher Blount reportedly turned it down.

Essex sought to establish himself as the queen's foremost councillor and assume leadership of the political faction which favoured military assistance to the Dutch Republic and the French Huguenots. In doing so, he began a rivalry at court with a peace-seeking faction led by the queen's principal adviser, Lord Burghley, and his son, statesman Robert Cecil. Burghley confronted Essex in the Council chamber in April 1598; according to chronicler William Camden, Essex denounced peace as "dishonourable and treacherous", but Burghley responded that Essex "breathed forth nothing but war, slaughter and blood."

The subject of the new Lord Deputy sparked one of the most infamous arguments between Essex and Elizabeth, which occurred on 30 June/1 July 1598. The queen wanted to appoint William Knollys, Essex's uncle, but Essex tried to persuade her to send Cecil's friend George Carew instead, so as to rid him from court. During the argument, Essex contemptuously turned his back on the queen. In response she cuffed him on the ear, prompting him to lay his hand on his sword. Before leaving the chamber Essex reportedly stated that "he neither could nor would put up so great an affront and indignity, neither would he have taken it at King Henry the Eighth his hands". He may have also described the queen "as crooked in her disposition as in her carcass". This outburst was the culmination of years of mounting frustration over his belief that the queen was unjustly rewarding his rivals. Elizabeth sought Essex's return and sent messengers to his country estate at Wanstead to encourage a reconciliation. Essex refused to submit, questioning the limits of royal authority in a letter that was circulated among his friends. He refused to return to council meetings until the queen gave him a private audience to air his grievances.

Burghley died on 4 August. Only ten days later, the Irish confederacy's greatest victory came at the Battle of the Yellow Ford, which ignited further rebellion throughout all of Ireland. The military situation was highly distressing to Elizabeth and the Privy Council of England. There was no clear leader of the English-led Irish administration, as Marshal Henry Bagenal was killed at the Yellow Ford. The death of Philip II of Spain in September made Essex's participation in the Privy Council even more necessary. Though willing to advise the queen in writing, he refused to rejoin his colleagues in person. Efforts were made to arrange Essex's return to court, and he eventually attended a council meeting on 10 September after recovering from a short illness. He met the queen two days later.

"...when I apprehended how much your Majesty would be grieved to have your armies beaten and your kingdom like to be conquered by the son of a smith, duty was strong enough to rouse me out of my deadest melencholy."

— Essex in a letter to Elizabeth, 26 August 1598

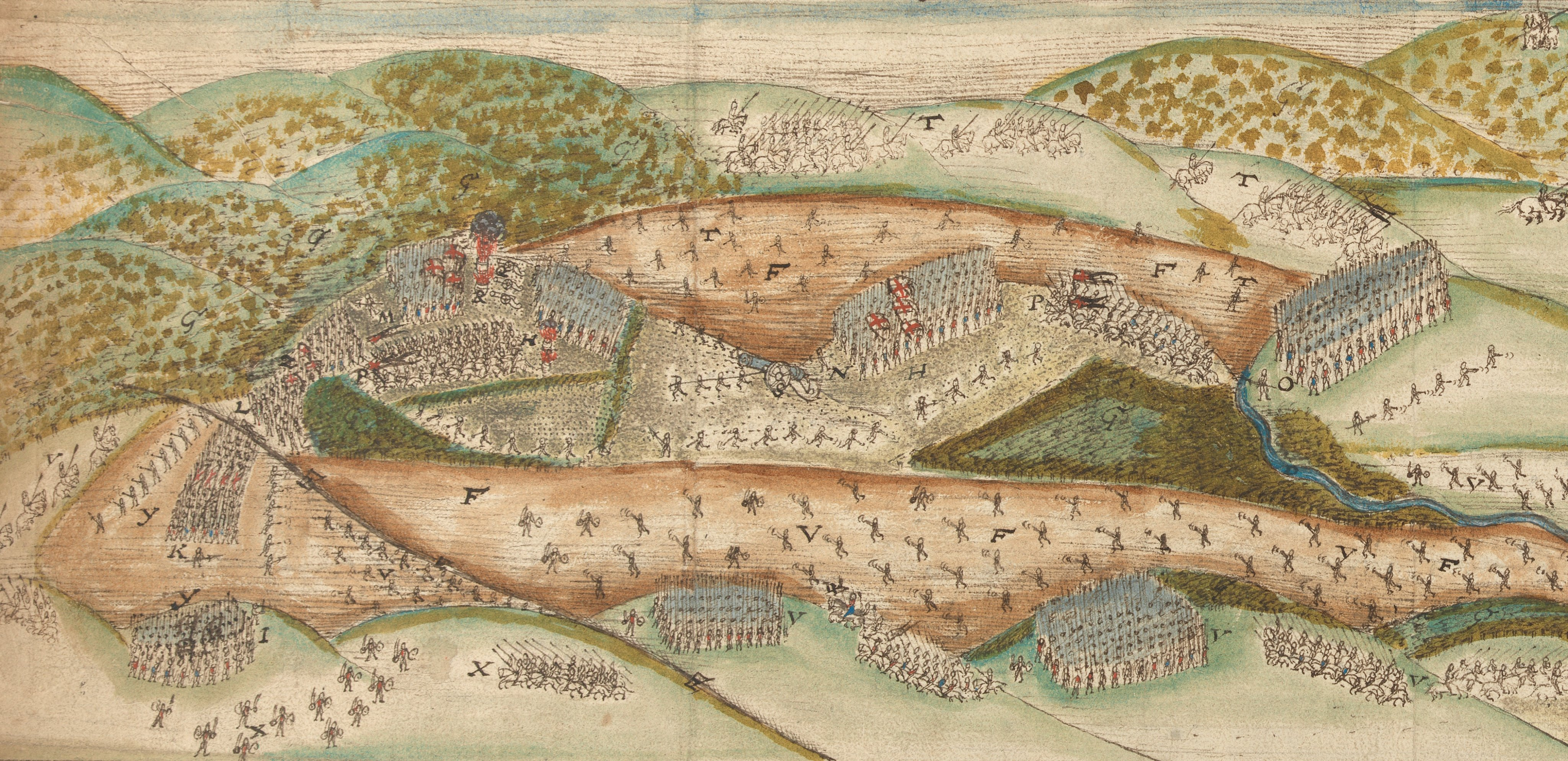
The Battle of the Yellow Ford on 14 August 1598 was the greatest Irish victory over English forces during the Nine Years' War.

Essex had damaged his standing at court, which was made obvious to observers when the queen unexpectedly did not grant him Burghley's office of Master of the Court of Wards. The faction fight resumed; Essex and Cecil tried to diminish each other's influence by proposing the Irish appointment (and therefore removal from court) of members of the opposing faction. Essex constantly belittled previous Irish campaigns as well as fellow military men. He opposed the suggestion that his friend Charles Blount, 8th Baron Mountjoy, should take the post, as he believed the viceroy could only be "some prime man of the nobility" and "someone strong in power, honour and wealth, in favour with the military men and which had been before general of an army". This ultimately placed Essex in a difficult position: either he could accept the role of Lord Deputy himself, or stand down and let another man lead what was to become England's largest military effort since 1588. He admitted to his friends: "I am tied by my own reputation". He still aspired to military glory and the political rewards he felt this would bring, and also saw the appointment as his only chance to reclaim political influence. By November 1598, Elizabeth's courtiers generally believed that Essex would be leading an Irish campaign that following spring. On 10 December, Cecil wrote to Irish officials that he believed Elizabeth "is now resolved of her General to be [Essex]". Essex's rivals welcomed this development as it would physically remove him from Elizabeth's court.

On 30 December, the queen formally selected Essex as her new viceroy in Ireland. With great reluctance, and out of his sense of duty, he accepted the post. On Twelfth Night in January 1599, the queen danced with Essex at a party held for the Danish ambassador. Her decision to dance with him at this sensitive political moment signalled to the court that he retained her support. Essex boasted to his supporter John Harington: "I have beaten Knollys and Mountjoy in the Council, and by God, I will beat Tyrone in the field; for nothing worthy of her Majesty's honour hath yet been achieved". However his most pressing concern was to strengthen his standing with the queen rather than prepare for the task awaiting him in Ireland.

"Into Ireland I go. The Queen hath irrevocably decreed it; the Council do passionately urge it; I am tied to my own reputation to use no tergiversation... I am not ignorant what are the disadvantages of absence; the opportunities of practising enemies when they are neither encountered or overlooked... The difficulties of a war where the rebel that hath been hitherto ever victorious is the least enemy that I shall have against me... the state that set me out must conspire with the enemy against me."

— Essex to Charles Willoughby, 2nd Baron Willoughby of Parham, 4 January 1599

== Commission ==
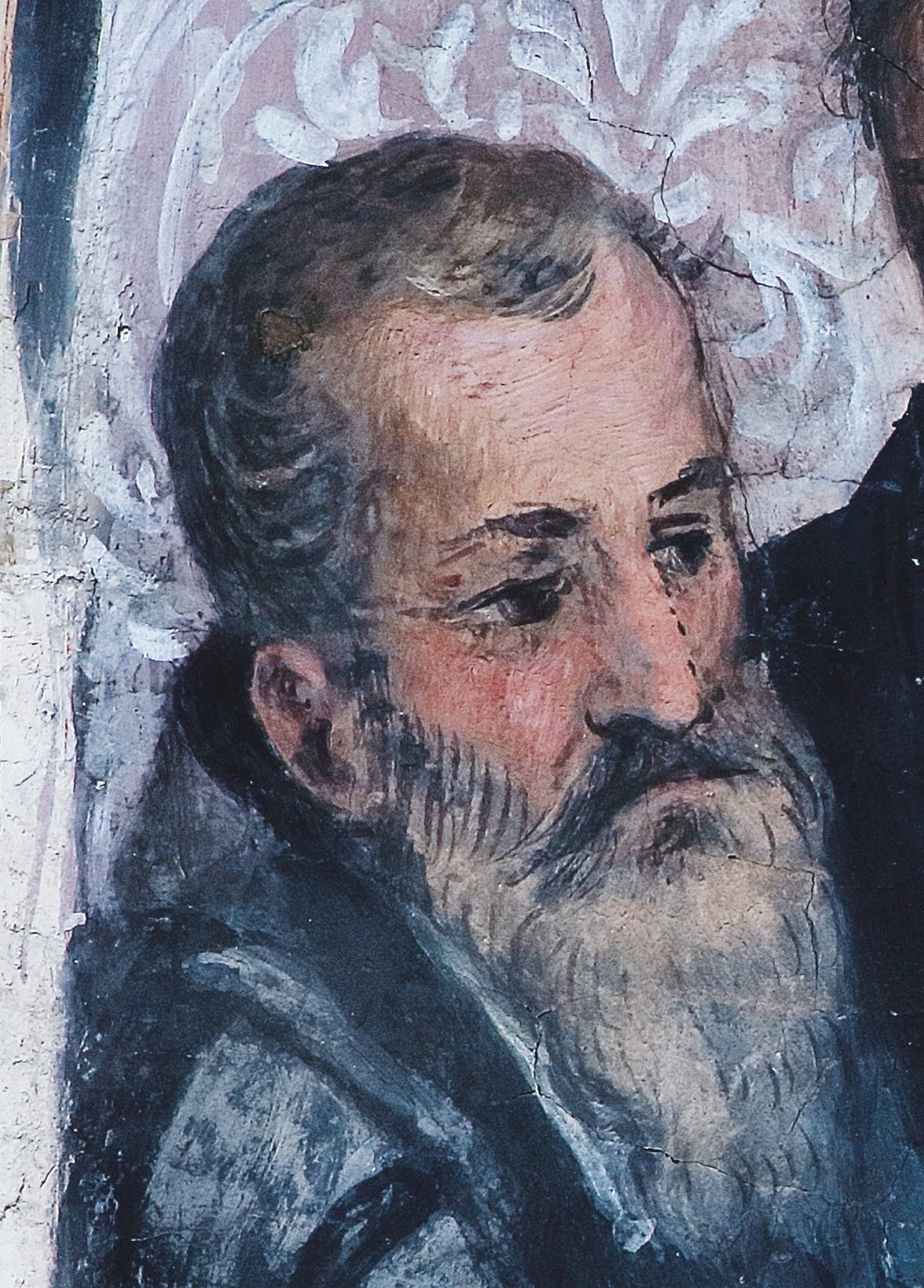
Hugh O'Neill, Earl of Tyrone, led the confederacy of Irish lords; Essex famously boasted he would "beat Tyrone in the field".

Discussion of the viceroy's commission had begun in August 1598, prior to Essex's formal appointment. The details remained in dispute almost until his departure from London. On 8 December, Sir John Chamberlain wrote to English officials in the Netherlands that "Essex's journey is uncertain, because the proportions for his enterprise are daily diminished. The number of troops was at first set down to be 14,000 with full allowance of victual and money, but these rates are diminished and Essex is displeased." Cecil stated two days later that Essex "shall have there a good army of 12,000 to 14,000 foot and 1,000 horse." On 20 December, Chamberlain reported the rumour that Elizabeth had promised to forgive Essex his father's £12,000 debt "and she says she meant forbearance of it during his absence". By 3 January, Elizabeth had apparently agreed to discharge Essex of £10,000 worth of debt so he could turn his full attention towards the new campaign. His full commission was agreed upon by 31 January and signed on 12 March.

Essex was granted a force of about 17,000 foot and 1,500 horse. Among the troops were 2,000 veterans transferred from the Low Countries led by Henry Dowcra. Essex was promised reinforcements of 2,000 troops from England every three months to make up for expected losses, and a regular postal service was established between Dublin and London via Holyhead. Six months' provisions were gathered in western ports for shipment to Ireland, while Essex carried a quarter-year's pay in treasure. He also had command of a squadron of five warships intended for a landing at Lough Foyle in the north. An emergency rendezvous for the squadron was appointed at Berehaven (or Baltimore) in the event of Spanish aggression, though the ships were ultimately confined to southern waters and played no part in the northern campaign. The campaign's expected cost was £290,000 per annum, twice that of Elizabeth's Netherlands campaign. This was the largest army ever dispatched to Ireland, and represented the most far reaching powers of any Irish viceroy under Elizabeth's reign.

Rather than the title Lord Deputy, Essex was granted the more prestigious title of Lord Lieutenant of Ireland, which had been previously only granted to Philip Sidney in 1567. Per his commission, Essex was empowered "to pardon treasons, to restore traitors, to grant lands, to displace martial officers, to make knights, to command ships appointed for Ireland, and to dispose of the queen's treasure with the advice of the Irish Council" without exceeding the sums authorised. In addition to the regular army, he attracted a large number of young "‘gentlemen voluntaries", who hoped to gain distinction through service.

== Travel to Ireland ==
Essex departed London on 27 March 1599 to great fanfare, with the citizens standing in rows of crowds for four miles blessing him and seeing him off. Essex's journey was also celebrated in literature. The hack writers of Grub Street produced honorific verses dedicated to him. In the final act of his play Henry V, William Shakespeare invites Londoners to welcome Essex home from a presumably successful campaign: "Were now the General of our gracious Empress / As in good time he may, from Ireland coming / Bringing rebellion broached on his sword". Upon reaching Bromley, Essex wrote to the Privy Council complaining about the queen's refusal to appoint his stepfather Christopher Blount as the new Marshal of her Irish army. This compounded with Elizabeth's earlier refusal to make his confidant, Henry Wriothesley, 3rd Earl of Southampton, General of the Horse. In a letter to the Privy Council, Essex admitted that he was not up to the task at hand and placed responsibility for the campaign on his army.

"I did move Her Majesty for her service to have given me one strong assistant, but it is not her will. What my body and mind will suffice to, I will by God's grace discharge with industry and faith. But neither can a rheumatic body promise itself that health in a moist, rotten country, nor a sad mind vigour and quietness in a discomfortable voyage... Only I must desire to be freed from all imputation, if the body of the army prove unwieldy, that is so ill furnished, or so unfinished, of joints; or of any maim in the service, when I am sent out maimed beforehand... Hereof I thought it fit to advertise your Lordships, that you might rather pity me than expect extraordinary success."

— Essex to the Privy Council of England, 1 April 1599

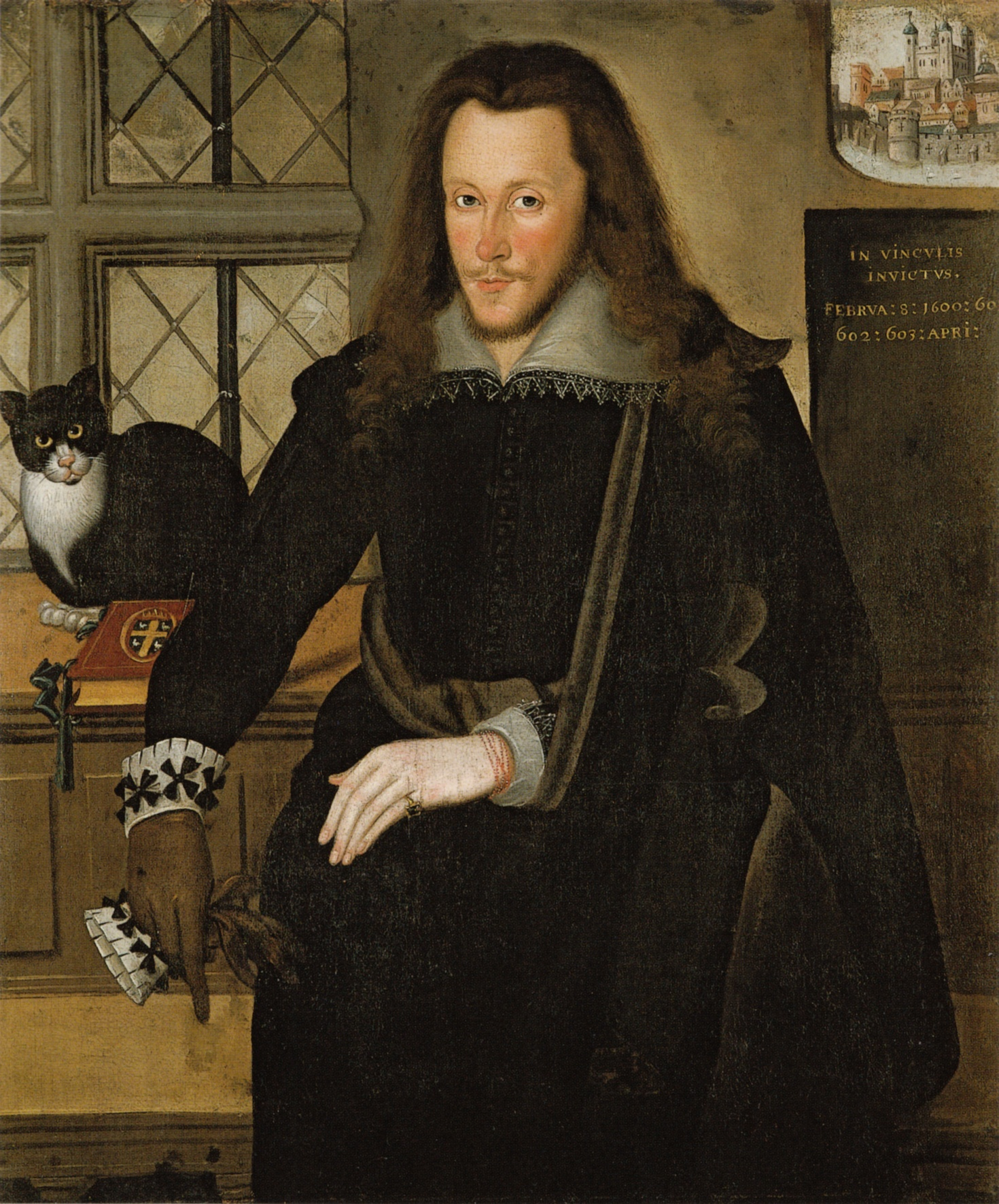
Henry Wriothesley, 3rd Earl of Southampton, was an ally to Essex.

Essex journeyed to Chester. On 5 April, he waited at Hilbre, an island at the mouth of the river Dee, for favourable winds in foggy conditions. A week later he sailed from Beaumaris after impatiently riding over Penmaen Mawr - "the worst way and in the extremest wet that I have endured" - while bidding his ships to meet him. After a violent passage he reached Dublin on 15 April and was sworn into office the same day, when the Archbishop of Dublin preached a notable sermon. The campaign had already suffered a blow in January on the death at Dublin of Sir Richard Bingham, a veteran commander of the Irish wars who commanded 5,000 troops from England. After Essex's arrival there was a further blow on the death of the young Earl of Kildare, who was set to join the campaign when his ship foundered in the Irish Sea and he was drowned along with eighteen Irish noblemen. There was also considerable anticipation among loyalists in Ireland. However, Thomas Reade, a veteran army captain, warned Cecil that Essex was unfamiliar with Ireland's complex politics, and that Irish war strategy, which involved garrisons and scorched earth tactics, was unlike the battles fought in continental Europe.

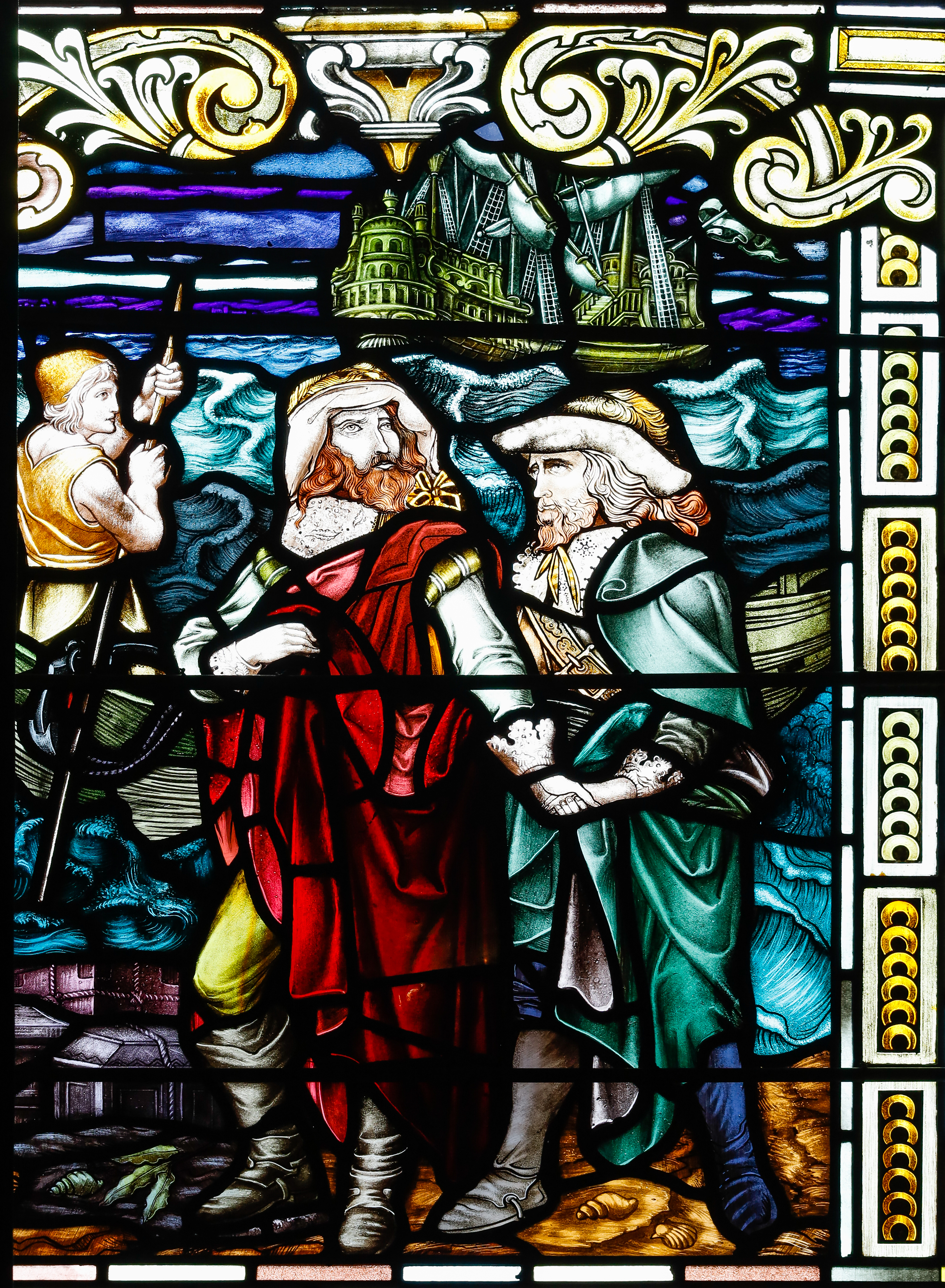
Detail of a stained glass window in the Guildhall, Derry, depicting Henry Docwra's landing at Culmore in April 1600

In his first week in Ireland, Essex mounted a lavish pageant of English chivalry during the Garter Feast at Dublin on St George's Day, 23 April. It was a pointed display of the values he felt were ignored at Elizabeth's Court. In London the Queen had chosen a muted version of the same ceremony, owing to the hardships of the war, and on hearing the reports from Dublin she granted the valuable mastership of wards to Cecil rather than the Earl. There was more humiliation for Essex when he rode north to Drogheda to inspect the famous 1,200 strong Flanders regiment, now commanded by Arthur Chichester. Essex charged the parading troops with his mounted staff, but they chose not to see the joke and stood firm, forcing him to pull his horse back as he was pricked in the backside with a pike. Essex's state of mind and attitude at this time has been the subject of much speculation. The general opinion of historians is that he was at first enthusiastic but quickly developed a defeatist outlook.

== Campaign preparations ==
The grand strategy favoured at Dublin, of attacking by land and sea simultaneously, was probably impossible with English resources, given the rumours of a fresh Armada from Spain and the need to keep warships in southern waters. The amphibious expedition to establish a northern base at Lough Foyle was abandoned, and the Dublin Council switched from an immediate attack on Tyrone and his confederate, Hugh Roe O'Donnell, when it became clear the strategy would fail through want of forage, cattle, and draught-horses. But this advice was declined by the Privy Council at London, which settled on a straight attack north into Ulster.

The Dublin Council may have been right: Tyrone bore out its fears by stripping food and horses from the lands bordering the Pale (an area around Dublin traditionally loyal to crown government). The rebel leader then encouraged a rebellion by the White Knight in the southern province of Munster, while O'Donnell moved into the western province of Connacht, with the expectation Tyrone would push south to join with the White Knight. War was in preparation at every point of the compass.

The Dublin Council advised Essex to attack Tyrone's confederates in the east, around the Pale, where the rebels were reckoned at 3,000 plus 800 mercenaries sent from Ulster. Essex seems to have taken that advice, ordering 5,000 troops into garrisons along the border of the Pale. To counter the White Knight he reinforced Cork on the south coast, and more troops were ordered into Munster for Sir Thomas Norris (acting president of that province) and into Kilkenny for the Earl of Ormond. In the west the army of the President of Connacht, Sir Conyers Clifford, was increased to 3,000. Conditions on the ground had set Essex in opposition to the Council in London: he put the threat from the north on hold and chose, instead, to head south and subdue Ireland in a roundabout tour - through the Pale into Munster, and heading back to Dublin through south Leinster.

== Southern campaign ==
Essex set out from Dublin on 9 May to muster his army in the champion fields of Kildare, the Curragh. He marched south, taking the castle of Athy, and was harried by the O'Mores as he passed beyond the Pale. He relieved the fort of Maryborough, and the first significant engagement came in the second week of May at the pass of Cashel in Queens County. The pass was wooded and boggy, with a plashed trench at either end. At the head of his advance were 40 shot and 20 swordsmen. In the face of rebel resistance the calivermen moved to point blank range and the swordsmen jumped into the trenches on the flanks; the vanguard moved through the calivermen in a frontal assault and pressed through to open country, where they halted until the whole column had joined them. Essex was said to have flown like lightning between the vanguard, battle, and rearguard. The English admitted to the loss of three officers and several men although the Irish claimed 500 were killed. The rebels captured many feathered helmets, and the battle became known as The Pass of the Plumes. According to Geoffrey Keating's History of Ireland, "in the year 1599, (Owny MacRory O'More) cut off a great number of the troops of the Earl of Essex, in a defile in their progress through Leinster, at a place called from that circumstance Bearna-Cleitigh, signifying the Pass of Plumes, from the great quantity of plumes left there, which were worn in the helmets of the English knights who were slain."

On 18 May Essex marched south to Kilkenny with two-thirds of his force. The streets of the city were strewn in welcome with green herbs and rushes, and Essex endured some lively orations from the local dignitaries. After meeting with Thomas Norris he departed on 22 May with 2,500 foot and 300 horse and was received with jubilation in the town of Clonmel. Two miles below the town, on the river Suir, the castle of Derrylare was surrendered, and Essex then fixed his sights on Cahir Castle, the strongest fortress in Ireland.

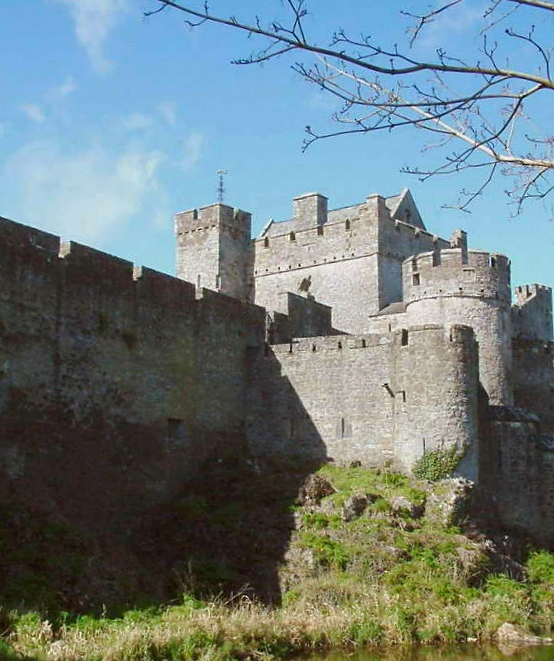
Essex led a siege against Cahir Castle in 1599.

Essex had accused Lord Cahir, whose brother had custody of the castle, of collusion with the White Knight. Upon the failure of a parley for the surrender of the castle the English took forceful action: in a cannonade lasting two days the curtain wall was breached and the garrison fled. Essex entered the castle on 29 May (see Siege of Cahir Castle).

Essex marched west to Limerick city, where he was well received on 4 June. At this point the army was joined by a large train of baggage porters, which outnumbered the fighting men two-to-one and remained a drain on resources throughout the campaign. At Askeaton (centre of resistance to the crown in the Desmond rebellion 15 years earlier) the army was revictualled after an encounter at Adare with the Sugán Earl, a pretender to the Earldom of Desmond who had shown himself with 2-3,000 men.

Essex realised the Munster rebels would not allow themselves to be trapped between his army and the western seaboard and decided to march south in an effort to draw them into battle. At Kilmallock he consulted the president, Thomas Norris, but conditions had begun to deteriorate, and it was reported that the soldiers "went so coldly on" that Essex had to reproach their baseness. There was no money, no magazine, no remnant of victual from the crown stores, and scarce enough cows to supply the army for two days, ammunition only for three. The army marched further south while Essex went to Mallow on a mission to procure supplies. He rejoined his men with a MacCarthy ally, but by the time he entered the heart of Desmond country the Sugán Earl and the rest of the rebels had gone into the field and were beyond reach.

Essex forded the river Blackwater at Affane, where he held a council of war in his tent, allowing Norris 1,100 foot and a company of horse to pursue the war in Munster. He marched unhindered eastward through Lord Power's country to Waterford City, where he was received with two Latin orations and a joyful concourse of people on 21 June. The army was ferried across the river, from Munster to Leinster, an operation that took a frustrating length of time, and Essex left Waterford on 22 June.

== Return to Dublin ==
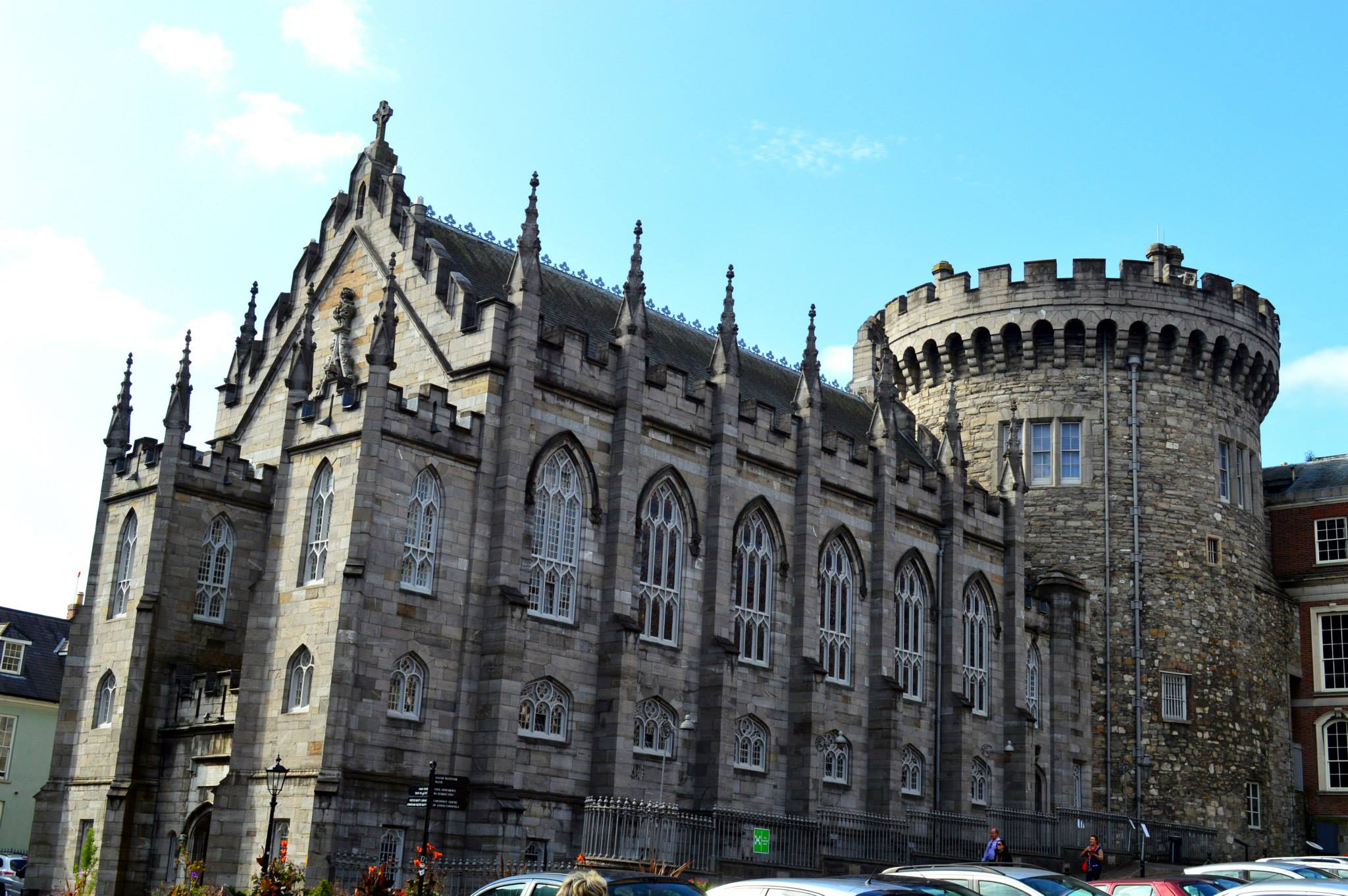
The English-led Irish administration was based at Dublin Castle.

The way to Dublin was north by Wicklow, where the English commander Henry Harrington had been heavily defeated at the Battle of Deputy's Pass near Wicklow on 29 May by the rebel Phelim MacFeagh O'Byrne. Essex marched over the river Slaney with 1,200 fighting men and a host of churls and horseboys, choosing to approach by the coast rather than risk the foothills. Along the way his men torched villages and houses, until confronted by O'Byrne with 1,000 troops four miles south of Arklow on the Clonnough river. The Earl of Southampton crossed in deep water with the horse, and the Earl of Ormond led the army over a ford near the sea. The rebels skirmished on the left flank but would not close until they saw the baggage train was vulnerable: they swept into a hard fight and routed the English, killing almost the entire force: "Though the English horse twice drove the Irish back - enabling one of the cavalry captains to rescue the infantry's drums and colours - the small army's morale was beyond help, and it broke and fled in all directions once open country was reached. Many were killed, and the fate of many survivors was little better". Essex marched on to Dublin, arriving on 2 July. After eight weeks Essex could barely muster 300 horsemen. Not a single rebel commander had submitted, and no district was left subdued. Many troops had been dispersed in garrisons in Leinster and Munster, and the strength of the army was much reduced by disease and desertion. In London Essex was further discredited at Court for repairing coastal defences at Waterford and elsewhere, when the Armada scare of that summer was at its height in England.

Essex planned a second offensive beyond the Pale, which went ahead despite the Queen's disapproval: Maryborough and Philipstown (where 60 men had just been lost) were resupplied around 25 July - by Blount and Essex respectively - and Essex fought on the border of Westmeath with the rebel Captain Tyrrell. Harrington took part in this offensive, and Clifford came from the west with reinforcements, only to lose many men in the fighting. A surprise attack on the O'Connors in the heart of their country was successful: their children were exposed to the might of the Crown army, their corn was burned, and 500 cows were seized in thick woods. But Essex had failed once more to engage a significant rebel force and he withdrew to Dublin.

Clifford returned to Connacht, where he was killed and his forces routed at the Battle of Curlew Pass. This defeat - so soon after the defeat of Harrington in Wicklow - was rated by Cecil as the heaviest blow ever suffered by the English in Ireland, and at Court the blame was laid on Essex. Tyrone was now free from threat in the west, and an attack on his territory in Ulster was unlikely. Crown authority in Ireland hung in the balance.

== Northern campaign ==
During the campaign Essex had wilfully abused his power by dubbing 38 knights; the rebels allegedly joked that Essex "never drew sword but to make knights". After Essex's death all these knights were later ritually degraded, and stripped of their knighthood by Elizabeth. The Queen announced that "it is doubted that if he continues this course he will shortly bring in tag and rag, cut and long-tail, and so bring the order into contempt". But she failed to curtail her commander and, according to her godson Sir John Harington, raged impotently at the news from Ireland: "She walks much in her privy chamber and stamps with her feet at ill news, and thrusts her rusty sword at times into the arras in great rage." She could take no more and on 30 July 1599 ordered an immediate attack on Tyrone.

Map of Ulster, c. 1598.

Essex agreed and announced his intention, but he was suffering from a recurrent ailment, possibly a kidney stone, which may have restrained his enthusiasm. Others too had misgivings about the Queen's plan, since the rebels were secure on their western front, making an attack from the south deeply hazardous without a base in Lough Foyle. A council of war declared against the plan, but a month later the Queen delivered a furious censure to Essex, complaining bitterly that only 5,000 fighting men were available, and not twice that number. Concerns over a rumoured Spanish landing on the Isle of Wight in England made reinforcement of the Irish army impracticable, while hopes of peace talks with Archduke Albert, the Spanish governor of Flanders, may have caused Essex to suspect treason amongst the Queen's councillors. But seven days after the controversial council of war Essex set out for the north with the hopeful notion that, "if he [Hugh O'Neill, Earl of Tyrone] has as much courage as he pretendeth we will on one side or the other end the war."

Essex departed Dublin on 28 August, and the army was mustered three days later outside Kells, making up 3,700 foot and 300 horse. Tyrone's readiness to outflank him and attack the Pale restrained Essex from advancing further, and in a letter to the Queen ("weary with life") he explained that Kells should be the frontier garrison for the coming winter. On 2 September he marched to Ardee, where Tyrone was sighted with his army on the far side of the Lagan, "a mile and a half from our quarter, but a river and a wood between him and us". The English claimed variously that the rebel leader had 10,000 foot and 1,000 horse, or 5,000 and 700. Heeding counsel not to engage because of the inferiority of his forces, Essex embattled the army and encamped on the left bank of the Lagan. Tyrone marched on the flank, keeping to the woods, while his horse-scouts stayed within sight.

The opposing commanders communicated with each other, and on 6 September Essex advanced with 2,000 foot and 300 horse. On sighting Tyrone he readied his army in the formation of a St Andrew's cross, with cavalry on either flank and to the rear. The war council hoped for an Irish attack and determined not to take the initiative. The next day Tyrone's envoy told Essex his master sought the Queen's mercy, and proposed a meeting with Essex at the ford of Bellaclinthe on the river Glyde.

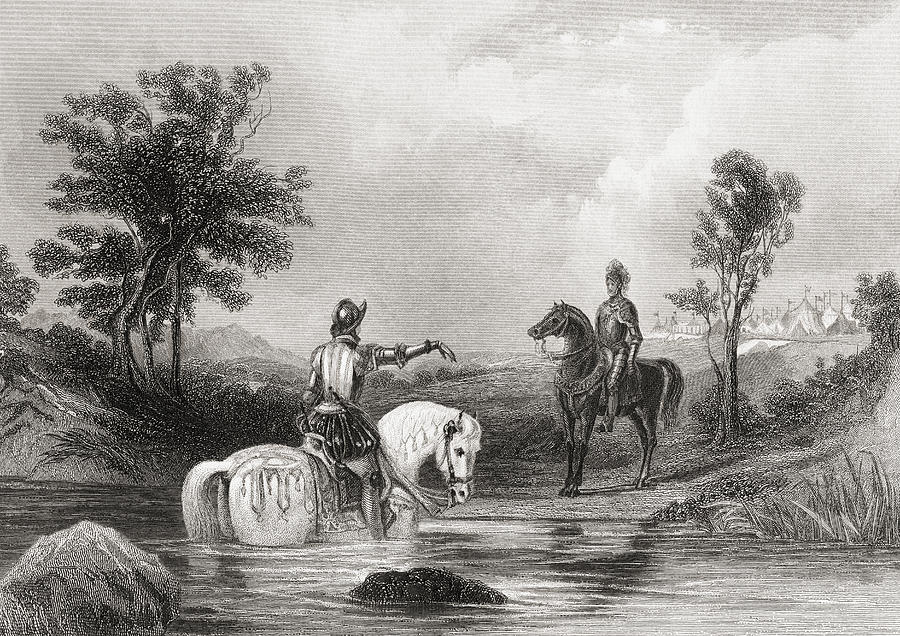
Nineteenth-century depiction of Essex and Tyrone's parley, which took place on 7 September 1599

On 7 September, Essex rejected the meeting place, but the impatient Tyrone found a spot to ride into the river up to his horse's belly. It was a gesture of humility, and Essex rode with a troop of horse to an overlooking hill before going down alone to the ford, where he conversed with the rebel for half an hour.

Because their parley was conducted privately, out of earshot of their armies, Essex was later accused of conspiring with Tyrone to seize the thrones of England and Ireland. These accusations are far-fetched and obviously defamatory. The spy James "Spanish" Blake claimed during his interrogation in Valladolid in 1602 that he had acted as an intermediary between Tyrone and Essex during this supposed conspiracy to overthrow Elizabeth I.

Both men withdrew to their companies on the hills. A formal meeting followed later, with six witnesses on either side. The confederates were Tyrone, Cormac MacBaron O'Neill, Arthur Roe Magennis, Hugh Maguire, Ever MacCooley MacMahon, Henry Hovenden and Richard Owen. The royalists were Essex, Henry Wriothesley, George Bourchier, Warham St Leger, Henry Danvers and William Constable—the sixth royalist witness was either Edward Wingfield or William Warren. Essex rode down to the ford with his men and remained on the bank, while the Irish rode into the river - again, up to their horses' bellies. Tyrone spoke bare-headed for a good while, saluting the viceregal party with great respect. After half-an-hour a further conference was arranged at Lagan ford for the following morning.

Essex continued his march to Drumcondra, while Tyrone returned to camp. At the planned conference on 8 September Tyrone was present, but not Essex. A cessation of arms was agreed for six weeks to six months, until May Day, either side being at liberty to break it on giving fourteen days warning; the English had liberty to attack Tyrone's confederates if they refused to be bound. The terms also provided for restitution of all spoils within 20 days after the warning, and the rebels were to hold all they then possessed, with no garrisons to be placed in new stations, free passages to be assured, all English garrisons to be apprised of the cessation, and commissioners for the borders between the English and Irish zones to be appointed. Tyrone was to ratify this on oath, Essex on his word. The terms were committed to writing and signed by Tyrone. The next day Essex dispersed his army and went to take physic at Drogheda, while Tyrone retired with all his forces into the heart of his country.

== Flight of Essex ==
In mid-September 1599 the queen wrote to Essex with further criticisms and forbade him from leaving Ireland without special warrant. A week later he committed responsibility for his government to two lords justice, placing Ormond in command of the army under his old commission, and gave instruction that the cessation was to be maintained, with garrisons fully victualled for six months. On the same day - 24 September - Essex boldly sailed for England, relying on his general warrant to return granted under the Great Seal. He reached London on the 28th, where he disturbed the Queen in her chamber before she was fully dressed.

Elizabeth described the cessation as the, "quick end made of a slow proceeding", and it was generally concluded that Essex's presence in Ireland had been superfluous. Essex revealed only to the Queen what had passed between him and Tyrone, having promised to deliver the rebel request verbally. At first treason was not suspected, but Elizabeth was outspoken about Tyrone: "to trust this traitor upon oath is to trust a devil upon his religion". She ordered no ratification, nor pardon, without her authority; but in time she did admit the usefulness of the cessation. Meanwhile, Essex was committed to custody, and on 29 November the council condemned him in the Star Chamber.

Tyrone was in two minds about the cessation and came under pressure from his confederate, O'Donnell, who argued that too much had been ceded to the English. Tyrone issued a list of demands on religious freedom, withdrawal of English influence, and confirmation of lands in rebel possession - probably the bones of his private conference with Essex. In a report of 18 November the rebels were said to have, "made two Irish terms of scorn against the Earl of Essex; one that he never drew sword but to make knights; the other, that he came like a hasty messenger, that went away before he had done his errand." Later that month there was a further parley on the Lagan, and a one-month extension was agreed. In December Tyrone complained of breaches of the cessation, and in the spring of 1600 he turned south on a campaign through Munster.

== Succession ==
The detail of the earl's private parley with Tyrone became the subject of speculation in England. Sir Henry Wotton, the earl's personal secretary, complained bitterly of the duplicity of interpreters, saying that they were Essex's worst enemies. Rumours of the earl's disloyalty abounded, and with the waning of his favour at court Essex chose to challenge the queen's authority by breaking house arrest and riding in force through London to gain an audience with her. He was compelled to turn back by a well-organised defence, and at Cecil's insistence was declared a traitor. After a swift trial on charges of treason Essex was convicted and suffered the death penalty in February 1601.

Intelligence received in Spain some years later from James Blake (the supposed assassin of O'Donnell) had it "that the Earl of Essex, the same who raided Cadiz, had dealings with the Prince Onel of Ireland about causing a rising against the Queen of England, for which reason he was beheaded in England, and the said Earl employed the deponent [Blake] as intermediary between himself and the said Prince." It was also put about that Tyrone had almost persuaded Essex to leave the service of Queen Elizabeth and to join that of King Philip III to whom, "they would deliver the whole kingdom". Tyrone was said to have promised Essex great favour on behalf of the Spanish king, and when Essex expressed doubt because of, "certain disservices he had done to the Crown of Spain", the rebel leader went so far as to offer Essex his son as a hostage in proof of his good faith.

As with so many late Elizabethan conspiracy theories Spanish calculations may have been of less importance than those of the queen's councillors. At the outset in 1599 Essex had realised he was taking a risk in departing the court and leaving the field open to Cecil, a risk that would pay off only if he defeated Tyrone. The Irish campaign proved far more difficult than anticipated - Essex was the last English commander of the age to underestimate rebel capability - and the situation at court deteriorated rapidly, with Cecil gaining an overwhelming influence over the queen. The private parley with Tyrone was especially significant at a time when Cecil was preparing the succession of the Scots king, James VI, to Elizabeth's throne. Essex's flight from Ireland was a desperate attempt to interfere with those preparations, and once this had failed his subsequent treason was down to his refusal to accept that it was Cecil, and not he, who would determine the succession.

== Sources ==
=== Primary sources ===
- Bacon, Francis (1601). "A Declaration of the Practices and Treasons attempted and committed by Robert late earl of Essex and his Complices against Her Majesty and Her Kingdoms". The works of Francis Bacon, Volume 3.
- Bacon, Francis (1604). Sir Francis Bacon His Apologie, In Certaine Imputations Concerning the Late Earle of Essex.
- Brewer, J. S.; Bullen, W., eds. (1869). Calendar of Carew Manuscripts in the Lambeth Library. Vol III: 1599-1600. (6 vols, 1867–73). London: Longman & Co., et al. vol I, 1515-1574 • vol II, 1575-1588 • vol III, 1589–1600 • vol IV, 1601-1603 • vol V, Book of Howth; Miscellaneous • vol VI, 1603–1624
- O'Donovan, John (trans.) (1856). Annala Rioghachta Eireann: Annals of the Kingdom of Ireland, by the Four Masters, from the earliest period to the year 1616, Volume 6. (7 volumes) (2nd ed.). Dublin: Royal Irish Academy. [NB For other volumes, see Annals of the Four Masters.]

=== Secondary sources ===
- Clavin, Terry (October 2009). "Devereux, Walter". Dictionary of Irish Biography. doi:10.3318/dib.002554.v1. Archived from the original on 22 September 2021.
- Falls, Cyril (1997) [1950]. Elizabeth's Irish Wars. New York: Syracuse University Press. ISBN 9780815604358.
- Hammer, Paul E. J. (2003). Elizabeth's Wars: War, Government and Society in Tudor England, 1544-1604. London: Macmillan International Higher Education. ISBN 9780230629769.
- Hammer, Paul E. J. (4 October 2008) [23 September 2004]. "Devereux, Robert, second earl of Essex". Oxford Dictionary of National Biography (online ed.). Oxford University Press. doi:10.1093/ref:odnb/7565. (Subscription, Wikipedia Library access or UK public library membership required.)
- Heffernan, David (4 July 2016). "The reduction of Leinster and the origins of the Tudor conquest of Ireland, c.1534–46". Irish Historical Studies. 40 (157): 1–21. doi:10.1017/ihs.2016.5. ISSN 0021-1214. JSTOR 26426024.
- Heffernan, David (1 May 2021). "Political discourse and the Nine Years' War in late Elizabethan Ireland, c.1593–1603". Historical Research. 94 (264): 282–302. doi:10.1093/hisres/htab011. ISSN 0950-3471.
- Kerney Walsh, Micheline (1996). An exile of Ireland, Hugh O'Neill, Prince of Ulster. Dublin: Four Courts Press. ISBN 978-1-85182-234-8.
- Kinsella, Pat (2 August 2025). "The Nine Years' War: Henry VIII's destructive conquest against Ireland's clans was one of the largest (and most expensive) in Tudor England". BBC Countryfile. Archived from the original on 19 January 2026.
- McGettigan, Darren (2005). Red Hugh O'Donnell and the Nine Years War. Four Courts Press. ISBN 978-1-85182-887-6.
- Mirabella, Bella (6 July 2012). "'In the sight of all': Queen Elizabeth and the Dance of Diplomacy". Early Theatre. 15 (1): 65–89. doi:10.12745/et.15.1.898. ISSN 1206-9078.
- Morgan, Hiram (February 2002), 'By God I Will Beat Tyrone in the Field': Essex and Ireland (PDF), archived (PDF) from the original on 15 June 2024
- Morgan, Hiram (September 2014). "O'Neill, Hugh". Dictionary of Irish Biography. doi:10.3318/dib.006962.v1. Archived from the original on 26 September 2023.
- Morris, Robert E. (1974). The Campaign of Essex in Ireland, 1599 (PDF) (Thesis). Dissertations. Paper 1380. Loyola University Chicago. Archived from the original (PDF) on 8 December 2023.
- McCormack, Anthony M. (February 2011). "Devereux, Robert". Dictionary of Irish Biography. doi:10.3318/dib.002553.v1. Archived from the original on 21 December 2021.
- McCoy, Richard C. (1989). The Rites of Knighthood: The Literature and Politics of Elizabethan Chivalry. University of California Press.
- Mears, Natalie (2003). "Courts, Courtiers, and Culture in Tudor England". The Historical Journal. 46 (3): 703–722. doi:10.1017/S0018246X03003212. ISSN 0018-246X. JSTOR 3133568.
- O'Neill, James (2017). The Nine Years War, 1593-1603: O'Neill, Mountjoy and the military revolution. Dublin: Four Courts Press. ISBN 978-1846827549.
- Shapiro, James (2005). 1599: A Year in the Life of William Shakespeare. London: PerfectBound. ISBN 0571214800.
- Strachey, Lytton (1996) [1928]. Elizabeth and Essex: A Tragic History (reprint ed.). Harcourt Brace & Co.
- McGurk, John (2006). Sir Henry Docwra, 1564–1631: Derry's Second Founder. Four Courts Press. ISBN 1-85182-948-2.
- Younger, Neil (June 2012). "The Practice and Politics of Troop-Raising: Robert Devereux, Second Earl of Essex, and the Elizabethan Regime". The English Historical Review. 127 (526). Oxford University Press. JSTOR 41474090.
- Weir, Alison (1999) [1998]. Elizabeth the Queen. via the Internet Archive. London: Pimlico. ISBN 978-0-7126-7312-9.
