= Richard Barnes (bishop) =

English Anglican priest

- Bishop of Durham
- Diocese: Diocese of Durham
- In office: 1575–1587
- Predecessor: James Pilkington
- Successor: Matthew Hutton
- Other posts: Bishop suffragan of Nottingham (1567–1570); Bishop of Carlisle (1570–1575)

Orders
- Ordination: 1558 (deacon & priest)
- Consecration: 9 March 1567 by Thomas Young

Personal details
- Born: 1532 Bold, south Lancashire, England
- Died: 24 August 1587 (aged 54–56)
- Denomination: Anglican
- Spouse: Fredesmund
- Children: Mary
- Education: Brasenose College, Oxford

Richard Barnes (1532 – 24 August 1587) was an Anglican priest who served as a bishop in the Church of England during the reign of Elizabeth I.

== Early life, education and family ==
He was born in Bold which was then a village near St Helens in south Lancashire. He attended Farnworth Grammar School and then was admitted to Brasenose College, Oxford. Here he was elected a fellow in 1552, and received his BA in 1553. This was followed by a BD and then a postgraduate MA in 1557. Finally he became a DD in 1579.

Barnes was ordained a deacon on 24 September 1558 at St Bartholomew-the-Great by Peter Wall, Bishop of Clonmacnoise and a priest on 7 December by Edmund Bonner, Bishop of London at his manor's chapel. After receiving Holy Orders he was made Minister of Stonegrave in Yorkshire. In 1561 he was appointed Canon Chancellor (and canon of the Laughton prebend which was annexed thereto) of York Minster, which offices he held until 1571.

He married Fredesmund Gifford in the 1560s. Their daughter Mary was born about 1567; she married Richard Jocelyn of Hyde Hall in Sawbridgeworth. (Jocelyn was an ancestor of the Baronets Jocelyn of Hyde Hall, the Viscounts Jocelyn and the Earls of Roden by his second wife Joyce Atkinson.)

== Episcopal career ==
In 1567 he was appointed Bishop suffragan of Nottingham and later, in 1570, was appointed Bishop of Carlisle. As bishop, he soon gained a reputation as someone dedicated to seeking out recusants. In 1575 he was translated to Durham, as a result of the patronage of William Cecil, 1st Baron Burghley: his election to that See was confirmed on 9 May and he was enthroned at Durham Cathedral on 19 May. It seems that he was on bad terms with Edmund Grindal, then Archbishop of Canterbury. One possible reason for this is that Barnes disapproved of Grindal's refusal to suppress the prophesyings – which refusal had led to Grindal being suspended from office.

== Whittingham affair ==
At the first Metropolitan Visitation of Barnes' tenure, in 1577, Edwin Sandys, Archbishop of York, delegated his authority to Barnes. However, he met determined opposition from the Dean, William Whittingham, who refused to allow him in to the chapter house. In retaliation, Barnes excommunicated Whittingham. Barnes later, during a legitimate episcopal visitation, described the diocese's affairs thus:

...that Augiae Stabulum, the church of Durham ... whose stink is grievous in the nose of God and of men and which to purge far passeth Hercules' labours (BL, Lansdowne MS. 25, fols. 161–2)

However, the conspiracy against Whittingham was brought to an end by the dean's death in 1579.

== Styles and titles ==
- 1532–1558: Richard Barnes Esq.
- 1558–1561: The Reverend Richard Barnes
- 1561–1567: The Reverend Canon Richard Barnes
- 1567–1579: The Right Reverend Richard Barnes
- 1579–1587: The Right Reverend Doctor Richard Barnes

== Sources ==
- Foster, Alan, A History of Farnworth Church, its Parish and Village, 1981.

Church of England titles
New title	Bishop of Nottingham; 1567–1570	In abeyance Title next held by Henry Mackenzie
Preceded by John Best	Bishop of Carlisle; 1570–1575	Succeeded by John May
Preceded by James Pilkington	Bishop of Durham; 1575–1587	Succeeded by Matthew Hutton
