= Bishop of Nottingham =

Bishop of Nottingham may refer to:

- Bishop of Nottingham (Roman Catholic)
- Anglican Bishop of Nottingham, former suffragan bishop title
- Bishop of Southwell and Nottingham, full diocesan bishop
