= Henry Harington (soldier) =

English and Irish landowner and soldier, died 1613

Sir Henry Harington of Bagworth and Baltinglass (died 1613), English and Irish landowner and soldier, known for his defeat at Arklow in 1599.

== Career ==
Henry Harington was a son of James Harington of Exton, Rutland (died 1592) and Lucy, the daughter of Sir William Sidney of Penshurst, Kent. His estates were at Bagworth and Baltinglass.

Harington was in command of troops in 1599 under the Earl of Essex in his military expedition of 1599–1600 to Ireland during the Nine Year's War. He was defeated at the Battle of Deputy's Pass near Arklow on 29 May 1599 by the forces of Felim McFiach O'Byrne, with the loss of 250 soldiers. There was a court-martial, and two captains were sentenced to death, and the troops of Captain Loftus were decimated by lot. Harington never had a significant military command again.

Later in the same year, his cousin Sir John Harington of Kelston wrote to Anthony Standen from Athlone with news of another incident. Henry Harington had met the Irish leader Rory Oge O'More for a parley or negotiation, but was abducted by him for ransom. Harington's friends would not send a ransom but surrounded his house with 100 soldiers. Rory Og wounded Harington 14 times and then escaped through the cordon. The English soldiers were frightened of Rory Og and thought he had compelled them not to touch him by magic.

In 1608 he began to build a castle at Carnew.

In his will, Harington initially nominated Jonas Quarles, brother of the author Francis Quarles, as his executor, but changed his mind. He bequeathed the tenancy of Wicklow or Baltinglass Abbey and mill to his servant Robert Barfoote.

He died in 1613.

== Family ==
His first wife was Cecilia Agar, daughter and co-heiress of Sir Francis Agar of Elmesthorpe, Leicestershire and Grangegorman, Dublin, MP for Kinsale, (d. 1577), their children were;

- John Harington of Elmesthorpe (d. 1615), who married in January 1603 Mary Offley (d. 1623), a daughter of a London merchant William Offley (d. 1600) and Anne Beswick, who employed an African servant called Frances. Anne later married Sir Henry Bromley of Holt. Mary bequeathed her cabinet at Holt Castle to her sister-in-law Elizabeth Smith, and requested her daughter Sara Harington should not marry a Mr Clare on account of his religion and estate. Sara or Sarah Harington was brought up with Lucy Russell, Countess of Bedford and became a Maid of Honour to Anne of Denmark. She later married John Frescheville, 1st Baron Frescheville.
- Jacob Harington
- William Harington (d. 1613).

In 1587 he married Ruth Pilkington, daughter of James Pilkington, Bishop of Durham and Alice Kingsmill, by whom he had five daughters and three sons, including;

- Henry Harington, who wrote a poem on the occasion of Lucy, Countess of Bedford not helping him when he was in prison for debt, and whose lyrics were included in the songbook of Henry Lawes.
- William Harington (c.1590-1627) of Twickenham and Hertingfordbury, MP, married Anne Wood, daughter of Sir John Wood of Albyns, and sister of Magdalen Wood.
- Elizabeth Harington, who married Sir Richard Moryson of Tooley Park, MP Richard Moryson
- Anne Harington, who married Thomas Roper, 1st Viscount Baltinglass and Baron of Bantre.
- A Maid of Honour to Elizabeth Stuart, Queen of Bohemia, known as Mistress Harington.
