= James Pilkington (bishop) =

English bishop (1520–1576)

The Right Reverend James Pilkington B.D.
- Bishop of Durham
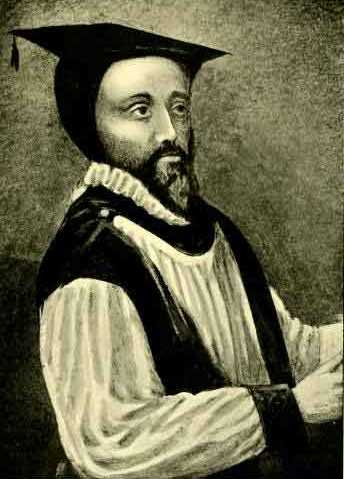
- Province: York
- Diocese: Durham
- Installed: 10 April 1561
- Term ended: 23 January 1576
- Predecessor: Cuthbert Tunstall
- Successor: Richard Barnes
- Other posts: Regius Professor of Divinity at Cambridge and Master of St John's College, Cambridge

Orders
- Consecration: 2 March 1561 by Thomas Young

Personal details
- Born: 1520 Rivington, Lancashire, England
- Died: 23 January 1576 (aged 55) Bishop Auckland, County Durham, England
- Buried: Durham Cathedral
- Denomination: Church of England
- Parents: Richard Pilkington; Alice Asshaw
- Spouse: Alice Kingsmill
- Children: 4
- Occupation: Bishop of Durham and Author
- Education: Pembroke College, Cambridge; St John's College, Cambridge

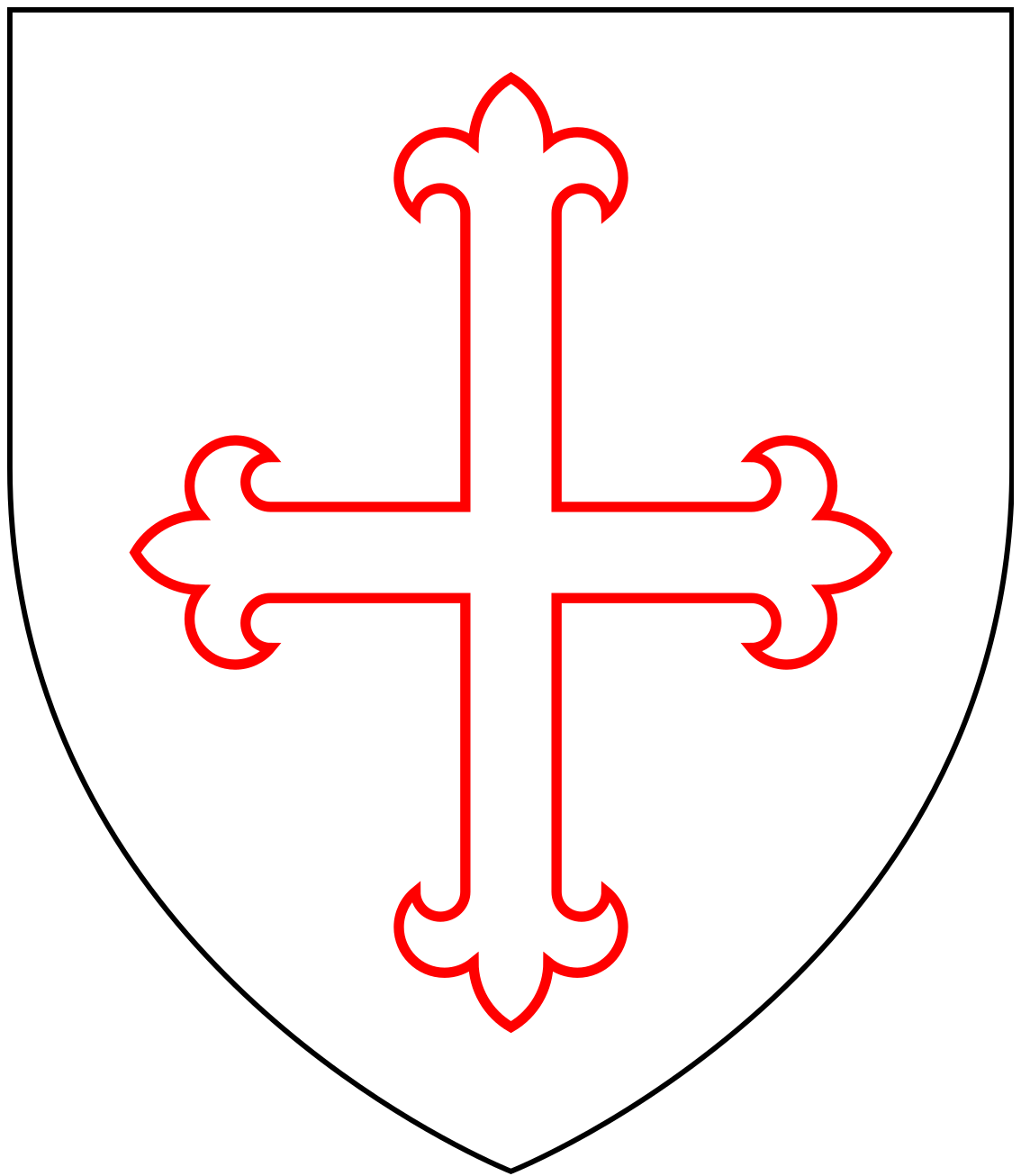
Arms of Pilkington: Argent, a cross flory gules voided of the field

James Pilkington (1520–1576), was the first Protestant Bishop of Durham from 1561 until his death in 1576. He founded Rivington Grammar School and was an Elizabethan author and orator.

== Early life ==
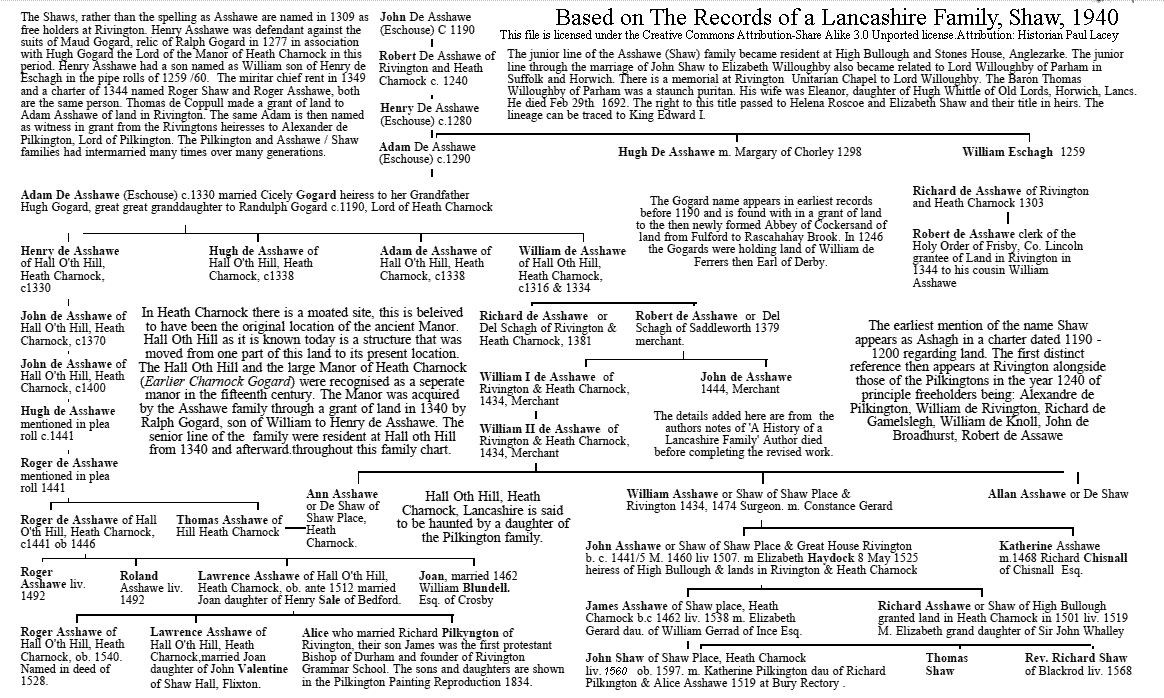
Family Tree of Alice Asshaw

James was the second son of Richard Pilkington of Rivington Hall, in the parish of Bolton le Moors and Alice Asshaw of Hall oth' Hill, near Heath Charnock in the parish of Chorley in Lancashire. His paternal ancestry is a junior line of the Pilkington family who owned land at Rivington from 1212 where they were Lords of the manor.

James Pilkington's early education is speculated to have been at Manchester Grammar School. He entered Pembroke College, Cambridge in 1536, and moved to St John's College, Cambridge, from where he graduated B.A. in 1539, and M.A. in 1542. James Pilkington was appointed Vicar of Kendal in 1545. He resigned this position to return to Cambridge. From 1547 he was granted right to preach under the ecclesiastical seal. In 1550 he became president of the college and graduated Bachelor of Theology in 1551.

== Marriage and children ==
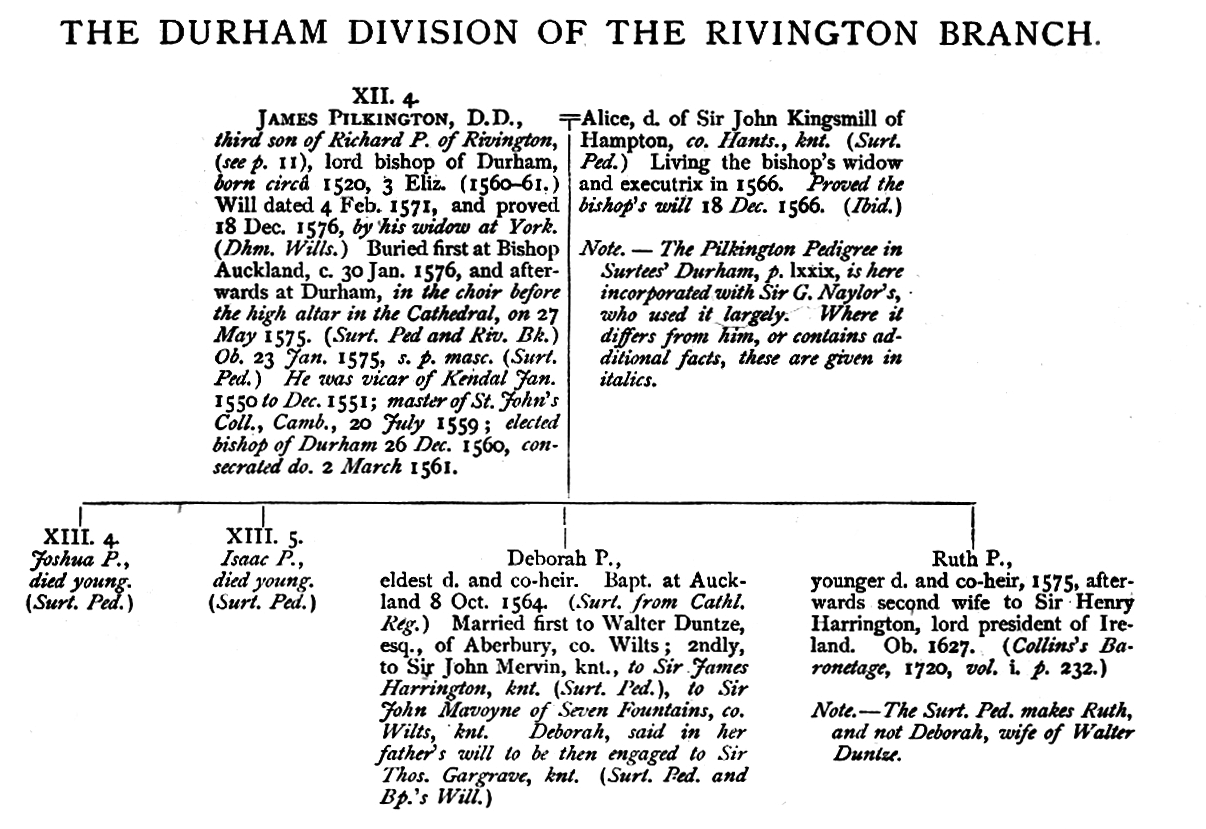
Family of James Pilkington

In or before 1564 James Pilkington privately married Alice Kingsmill (died 25 June 1594), daughter of Sir John Kingsmill of Sydmonton Court in Hampshire, a leading Protestant. They had two sons and two daughters:

His sons Joshua and Isaac, died in infancy. His daughter Deborah (born 1564 – died unknown) married twice, first to Walter Dunch (circa 1552 – 4 June 1594), of Avebury Manor in Wiltshire, M.P. for Dunwich, then she married Sir James Mervyn, of Fonthill Gifford also in Wiltshire, M.P. for that county. His younger daughter Ruth (died 1627) became the second wife of Sir Henry Harrington of Bagshaw and Baltinglass in 1587, they had a son, Henry. Henry's only daughter to survive into adulthood, Morag Harrington (Died 1669), married James Pilkington's own great nephew, Charles Tynewood Pilkington (died 1689).

== Exile ==
On the death of Edward VI in 1553 the line of succession fell to Queen Mary I, a Roman Catholic, intent on restoring England to the Church of Rome. During her reign, Pilkington escaped the Marian persecutions in England by fleeing to the continent, ensuring his survival. Whilst he was there many Protestants were persecuted and executed in England. James Pilkington went to Zürich, Geneva, Basel, and Frankfurt where he educated local Protestant children and associated with the leaders of the Protestant cause in Europe raising support for Princess Elizabeth. He returned to England in 1559 after the death of Queen Mary knowing the line of succession went to Queen Elizabeth I.

== Oratory ==
On his return he became prominent through preaching at St Paul's Cross and in Spital pulpit. On 20 July 1559, he was appointed Master of St John's, and also Regius Professor of Divinity at Cambridge. He was an active preacher in Cambridge and London; on 20 July 1560 he preached at the memorial service for Martin Bucer and Paul Fagius at Cambridge.

In June 1560 he preached before Elizabeth I at the Royal Court, impressing the Queen who wrote to the chancellors of the universities recommending the study of divinity and making an offer of office or preferment to the best of those who preached divinity. In 1560 he wrote, "Aggeus (Haggai) the Prophete, declared by a Large Commentary".

== Bishop ==
After turning down the bishopric of Winchester over a dispute about crown alienation of church land, he was nominated Bishop of Durham on 26 December 1560, consecrated on 2 March 1561, and enthroned on 10 April. He resigned the mastership of St John's in October of that year, where he was succeeded by his brother, Leonard. He obtained the restitution of the lands belonging to the see, but had to pay over £1,000 a year to the Crown as compensation.

Pilkington was involved in the debate after the destruction of St Paul's Cathedral by lightning in June 1561. In the aftermath, he preached a sermon at Paul's Cross ascribing the destruction to the wrath of God and warning of worse to follow. The sermon provoked an angry response from a Catholic apologist alleging the cause was abandoning the old faith and blasphemy. Pilkington was rattled and responded with a "Confutation of an Addition" (1563), an uncompromising onslaught on the Catholic church.

In early 1562, James Pilkington was in London where, in a sermon, he denounced a man from his native Lancashire known as Elias, who had claimed to have foresight and was famous during the reign of Queen Mary, to whom he is reputed to have spoken at Greenwich. The bishop produced the "Book of the Common Good" in defence of the Anglican church against the teachings of the Church of Rome.

As bishop, Pilkington sought to bring order to his diocese, dealing with recusancy and conflicts of power with the Earls of Westmorland and Northumberland, in which he was helped by the new dean, William Whittingham, appointed in 1563. Pilkington and Whittingham worked to ensure the appointment of committed reformers in what had been an area of strong recusant Roman Catholic feeling. In the 1560s and 1570s Pilkington exercised his patronage of cathedral prebends and invariably nominated zealous Protestants, many of them his relatives and friends.

In 1565 Bishop Pilkington issued a charter of incorporation for the citizens of Durham and Framwelgate.

== Education ==
One of the bishop's chief contributions to Protestantism was his interest in education, of which he was a keen promoter. On arrival in Durham in 1561 he considered starting a school in his house, and in 1567 he was a petitioner to the queen for the foundation of a Free Grammar School at Darlington. His main achievement was the foundation of Rivington Free Grammar School in 1566. The school was near Rivington Church, the chapel founded by his father which was freed from the jurisdiction of Bolton parish church at the same time. In his will, dated 4 February 1574, and proved at York 18 December 1576, he left books to the school, family and friends.

The east window of Rivington and Blackrod High School Chapel contains a stained glass window installed in 1912 commemorating the bishop and other donors to the chapel. The side lights illustrate events in the career of the bishop, his mastership of St John's College, Cambridge, the bishop fleeing to Europe, teaching children in Zürich, and revising the Book of Common Prayer with Matthew Parker, the Archbishop of Canterbury.

== Rising of the North ==
The bishop and his family had fled to London dressed as beggars in 1569 at the time of the Rising of the North led by Charles Neville, 6th Earl of Westmorland and Thomas Percy, 7th Earl of Northumberland. They plotted to overthrow Elizabeth I and reinstate Roman Catholicism. The city of Durham, the seat of the bishop, was not strongly fortified and the rebel earls entered the city on 14 November, with three hundred horsemen, "where they rent and trampled underfoot the English bibles and Books of Common Prayer". They celebrated Mass in Durham Cathedral and issued a proclamation claiming that their intention was to restore the Catholic religion, but not to unseat Queen Elizabeth.

The rising had popular support in the region and an army of 1000 on horse and 6000 on foot was raised. The rising, which was plotted at Brancepeth and Raby Castles failed. Brancepeth and Raby were confiscated but the bishop was not allowed to profit by these forfeitures, which he claimed by right of his Palatinate. There were 700 rebels listed for execution. Those who were not executed were mostly pardoned, though a few escaped from the country or were banished. An Act of attainder passed in 1571 outlawed 56 of the principal rebels. People who could not afford individual pardons were included in large numbers of "group pardons" issued on 25 April 1570 and listed in the Calendar of Patent Rolls. At the time of Northern Rising he was in London and the queen did not allow him to profit by the forfeitures which followed, his claim being set aside 'for that time.'

== Death and legacy ==
James Pilkington died at Bishop Auckland on 23 January 1576 at the age of fifty-five. A contemporary remarked that "this wicked country ... caused Mr James Pilkington to spend his life in continual pains and mournings and at length ended him". His body was buried at Bishop Auckland and reburied on 24 May 1576 at the head of Bishop Beaumont's tomb in front of the high altar of Durham Cathedral.

He provided well for his daughters on their marriages and had promoted four brothers to positions in his diocese. In his will he left various items of furniture to his successor in lieu of dilapidations but this was unacceptable to the next bishop, Richard Barnes, who took action against James Pilkington's executors regarding the state of some of the episcopal residences.

Before becoming bishop he contributed to the Book of Common Prayer of 1559 and the Thirty-Nine Articles. He contributed to Book of Homilies, and published commentaries on the prophets Haggai (1560) and Obadiah (1562), "A Confutation of an Addition, with an Apologye written and cast in the Streets of West Chester against the causes of burning Paules Churche", 1563. His last published work was not printed until after his death, the book titled, "A Godlie exposition upon certaine chapters of Nehemiah" was printed at Cambridge by Thomas Thomas in 1585. A collected edition of his writings was published by the Parker Society in 1842.

=== Pilkington painting ===
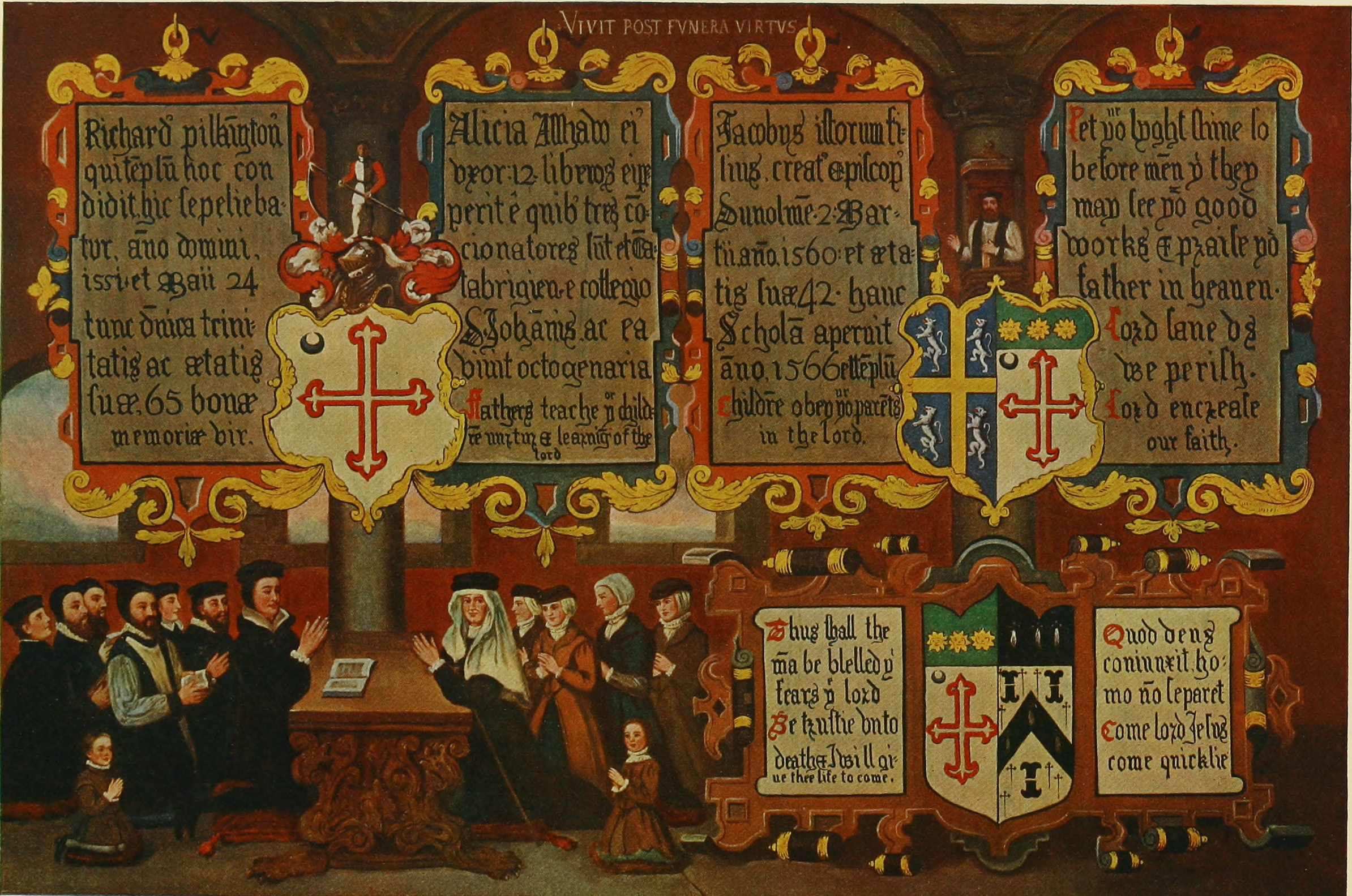
The "Pilkington Painting" Rivington Church, Rivington, Lancashire. 1835 copy of original made in 1566. The shields depict the Bishop's paternal arms, his augmented arms as bishop and the arms of Kingsmill, for his wife

The "Pilkington Painting" in Rivington Church, Rivington, Lancashire, was commissioned in 1566 by Bishop Pilkington, in memory of his father who built the church. The original picture measured 53 by 35 inches and was considerably damaged by a fire in 1834, and in 1904 its remains were in the possession of Colonel John Pilkington of Wavertree. A copy had been made in 1821 for Mr. John Pilkington of Bolton, by his daughter Miss Jane Noble Pilkington. A copy of the 1821 painting was commissioned in 1835 by Rivington Church, where it is on display today.

Columns in the painting are a stylised representation of Durham Cathedral. On the left column is an heraldic escutcheon displaying the arms of Sir Robert Pilkington, second son of Sir Roger Pilkington (died 1347), lord of the manor of Pilkington, Stand: Argent, a cross patonce gules voided of the field, with a crescent azure for difference of a second son, in the dexter chief, surmounted by the crest, A mower with his scythe.

At right: Arms of the See of Durham impaling Pilkington, with a chief of augmentation granted to Bishop James Pilkington on 10 February 1561, by Sir Gilbert Dethicke, Garter King of Arms. Augmented arms of Bishop Pilkington: Argent, a cross patonce gules voided of the field on a chief vert, three suns or, with the mark of cadency of a second son. Above these arms is a figure of the Bishop, wearing his Episcopal robes, and the cap peculiar to those times.

Beneath the shield is a triple carved Elizabethan frame. The centre panel shows the arms of the bishop impaling the canting arms of Kingsmill (Argent, semée of cross-crosslets fitchée sable, a chevron ermines between three millrinds of the second a chief ermine), for his wife, Alice Kingsmill, daughter of Sir John Kingsmill of Sidmanton. Grouped round the table at the bottom left of the painting are Richard and his seven sons, and across the table, Alice and her five daughters. James, the bishop is depicted in his rochet, red gurnard and gown.

At the top of the painting is the inscription,'VTVIT POST FUNERA VIRTUS', 'Virtue lives after death'. The inscriptions contained in the four cut and scrolled Elizabethan framework panels:

- Richard Pilkinton (sic), who built this church, was buried here, in the year of Our Lord 1551, and 24 May, then Trinity Sunday, aged 65. A man of good esteem.
- Alice Asshawe, his wife, bore him 12 children, of whom three are preachers and of St. John's College Cambridge, she lived eighty years. Fathers teach your children nurture and learning of the Lord.
- James, their son, became Bishop of Durham on 2 March, in the year 1560, and in the 42nd year of his life. He opened this school in the year 1566 and church. Children obey your parents in the Lord.
- Let your lights shine so before men ye they may see ye good works, O father in heaven. Lord Save Us. We perish. Lord increase our faith.

Academic offices
Preceded by Thomas Sedgwick	Regius Professor of Divinity at Cambridge; 1559–1560	Succeeded by Leonard Pilkington
Preceded by George Bullock	Master of St John's College, Cambridge; 1559–1561	Succeeded by Leonard Pilkington
Church of England titles
Preceded by Cuthbert Tunstal	Bishop of Durham; 1561–1576	Succeeded by Richard Barnes
