= Matthew Hutton (archbishop of York) =

Archbishop of York from 1595 to 1606

The Most Reverend Matthew Hutton
- Archbishop of York
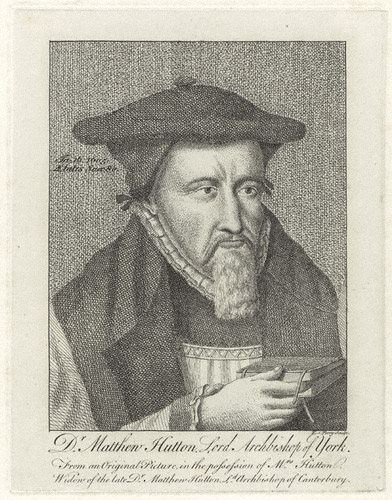
- Installed: 1595
- Term ended: 1606
- Predecessor: Edwin Sandys
- Successor: Tobias Matthew

Personal details
- Born: 1529 Warton, Lancaster
- Died: 1606 (age 76–77) Bishopthorpe
- Buried: York Minster
- Denomination: Church of England

Matthew Hutton (1529–1606) was archbishop of York from 1595 to 1606.

== Life ==
Arms of Matthew Hutton: Gules, on a fess between three cushions argent tasselled or a cross humettée between two fleurs-de-lys of the first, granted 20 July 1584 by William Dethick, Garter King of Arms, while Hutton was still Dean of York

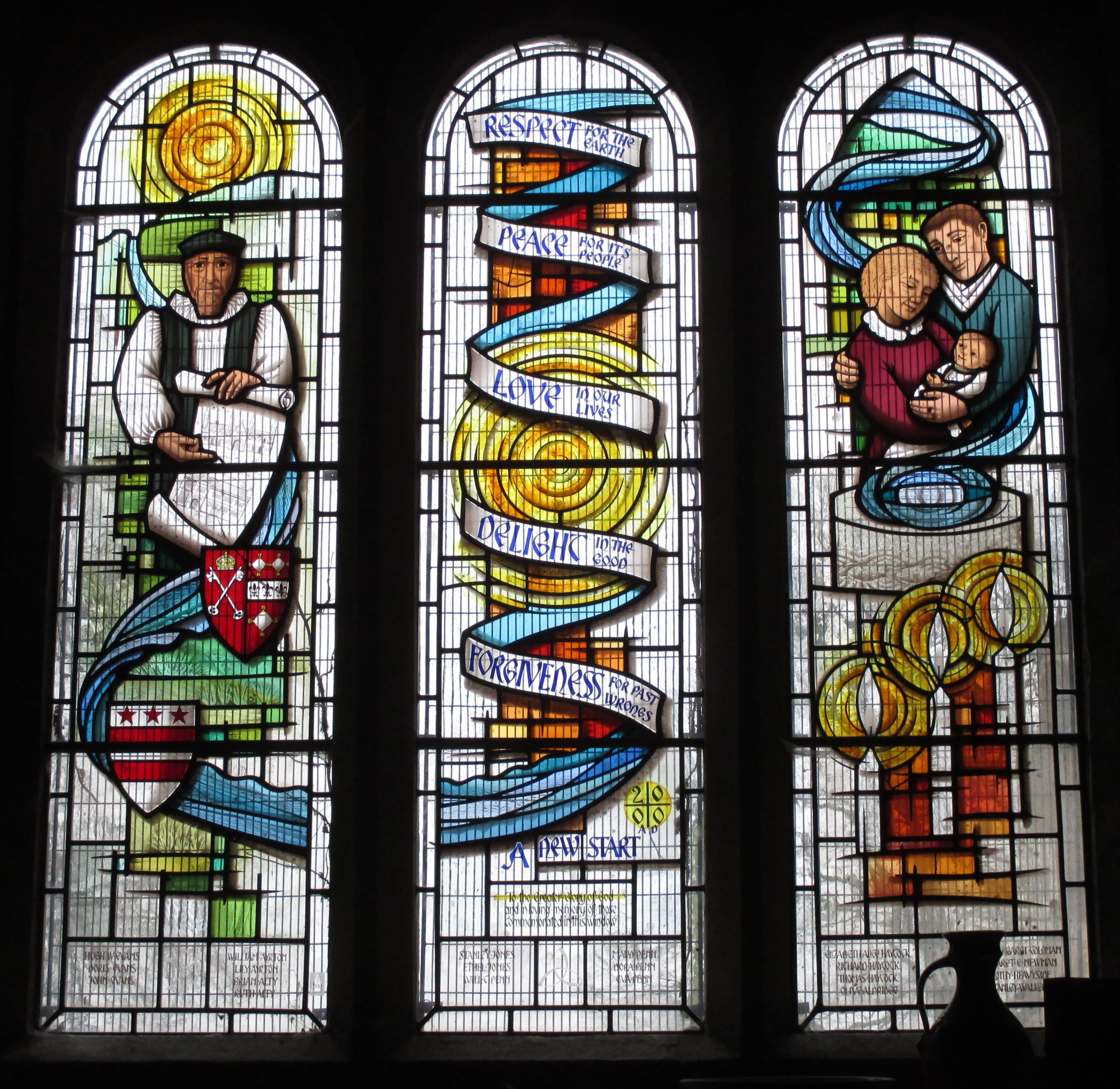
Modern stained glass window in Warton Church showing Hutton holding an architectural drawn plan of the church, with his arms as Archbishop of York

Hutton, the son of Matthew Hutton of Priest Hutton, in the parish of Warton, Lancashire, was born in that parish in 1529. He was educated at Lancaster Royal Grammar School (then called the Free School at Lancaster). He became a sizar at Trinity College, Cambridge in 1546. After graduating B.A. 1551–2, he became a fellow of Trinity in 1553, and graduated M.A. 1555 and B.D. 1562. In 1561 he was elected Lady Margaret's Professor of Divinity, and next year master of Pembroke Hall, and regius professor of divinity. In the same year he was collated prebendary of St Paul's, London, and in 1563 instituted rector of Boxworth, Cambridgeshire (resigned in 1576). About the same time he obtained a canonry at Ely. In 1564 he distinguished himself by his ability in the theological disputations before Queen Elizabeth I at Cambridge, and his character was established as one of the ablest scholars and preachers in the university. He was created D.D. there in 1565, and later in the year was installed a canon of Westminster. In the succeeding year he was one of the Lent preachers at court and a preacher at St Paul's Cross. After his appointment in April 1567 as dean of York he resigned his mastership at Pembroke, the regius professorship, and his canonries of Ely and Westminster. Subsequently, he was collated to prebends at York and Southwell. He was suggested as fit to succeed Edmund Grindal in the see of London in 1570, but his election was opposed by Archbishop Matthew Parker. A letter to Burghley, dated 6 October 1573, is preserved at Hatfield, giving at length his opinions on prevailing differences in church government. He was suspected of leaning to the Puritans, and this led to a dispute with Archbishop Edwin Sandys, who in 1586 preferred a charge of thirteen articles against him. Hutton defended himself with spirit, and, though compelled to make submission, admitted nothing more than the use of violent and indiscreet expressions.

On 9 June 1589 he was elected through Burghley's influence to the bishopric of Durham. On 11 December 1594, and in February 1595, he wrote beautiful and pathetic appeals to Burghley on behalf of Lady Margaret Neville, who had been condemned on account of the rebellion of her father, Charles, 6th Earl of Westmorland, and he was not only successful in his application for mercy, but gained a pension for the lady.

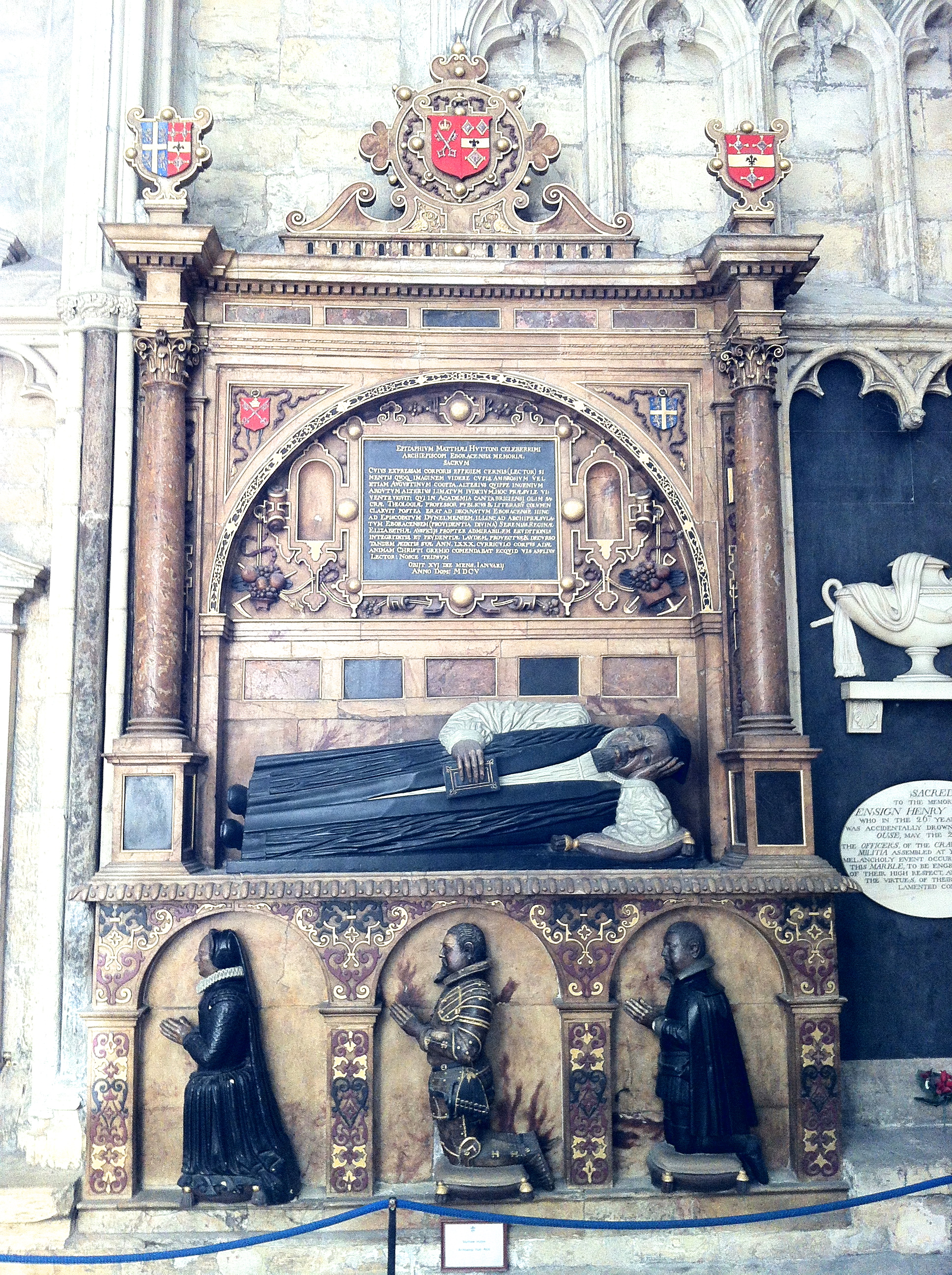
Monument with semi-recumbent effigy of Archbishop Matthew Hutton in the south choir aisle of York Minster, showing his arms as Archbishop of York and as Bishop of Durham

On 14 February 1595/6 he was elected archbishop of York. The grammar school and almshouses at Warton were shortly afterwards founded by him. In John Harington's Nugæ Antiquæ, ii. 248, there is an account of a bold sermon which he preached before Queen Elizabeth I at Whitehall. He acted as lord president of the north from 1595 to 1600, and in 1598 he had in his custody at Bishopsthorpe Sir Robert Ker of Cessford, one of the wardens of the Scottish Marches. His courtesy to his prisoner was afterwards acknowledged by King James and by Sir Robert himself. One of his last public acts was to write a letter to Robert Cecil, Lord Cranborne, counselling a relaxation in the prosecution of the puritans. He died at Bishopthorpe on 16 January 1605/6, and was buried in York Minster. His monument is in the south aisle of the choir.

He married in 1565 Catherine Fulmetby, or Fulmesby, who died soon after. In 1567 he married Beatrice, daughter of Sir Thomas Fincham. She died on 5 May 1582, and on 20 November following he married Frances, widow of Martin Bowes (died 1573), son of Sir Martin Bowes. (The archbishop's wife Frances left to her grandson Matthew Bowes her home in Coppergate, York, that she had purchased from "Parcivall Levett of York, merchant.") The archbishop left several children by the second marriage. Of these, Timothy Hutton, the eldest son, born 1569, was knighted in 1605, the year in which he was high sheriff of Yorkshire, and died in 1629; the second son was Sir Thomas Hutton of Popleton (d. 1620). The archbishop was blamed by some for granting leases of church lands to his children, which apparently considerably enriched them. He was an ancestor of Matthew Hutton (archbishop of Canterbury) (1693–1758).

A portrait of Hutton is at Marske, Richmondshire, in the possession of descendants. A second portrait was twice engraved, first by Perry, and secondly for William Hutchinson's History and Antiquities of the County Palatine of Durham. The Hutton Correspondence, edited by James Raine and published by the Surtees Society in 1843, contains many of the archbishop's letters.

== Works ==
He is author of:

- A Sermon preached at York before … Henry, Earle of Huntington, London, 1579, 12mo.
- Brevis et Dilucida Explicatio veræ, certæ, et consolationis plenæ doctrinæ de Electione, Prædestinatione ac Reprobatione, Harderwijk, 1613, 8vo.

== Notes ==
Academic offices
Preceded by Leonard Pilkington	Regius Professor of Divinity at Cambridge; 1562–1567	Succeeded by John Whitgift
Preceded by Edmund Grindal	Master of Pembroke College, Cambridge; 1562–1567	Succeeded by John Whitgift
Church of England titles
Preceded by Nicholas Wotton	Dean of York; 1567–1589	Succeeded by John Thornborough
Preceded by Richard Barnes	Bishop of Durham; 1589–1595	Succeeded by Tobias Matthew
Preceded by John Piers	Archbishop of York; 1595–1606	Succeeded by Tobias Matthew
