= Battle of Deputy's Pass =

Battle fought in County Wicklow in 1599

- Part of the Nine Years' War
Date	29 May 1599
Location	County Wicklow
Result	Irish victory

Belligerents
Irish Alliance: O'Byrnes	Kingdom of England

Commanders and leaders
Felim McFiach O'Byrne	Sir Henry Harrington

Strength
~450	~500

Casualties and losses
~20	~250 killed, missing and deserted

The Battle of Deputy's Pass was fought in County Wicklow on 29 May 1599, during the Nine Years' War in Ireland. A Gaelic Irish force under Felim McFiach O'Byrne ambushed an English army of about 500, under Sir Henry Harrington, which was marching from Rathdrum to Wicklow. The English army was routed and lost about 250 men.

== Background ==
The O'Byrnes had been allied to Hugh O'Neill, Earl of Tyrone since the outbreak of the Nine Years' War in 1593. Fiach McHugh O'Byrne had worked together with O'Neill, so much that he was described as the earl's "right arm in Leinster". However, when Fiach was killed in 1597, the power of the O'Byrnes seemed to wane. When Robert Devereux, 2nd Earl of Essex was appointed Lord Lieutenant of Ireland in 1599, he ordered Harrington into County Wicklow to deal with the O'Byrnes and their allies, the O'Tooles.

Harrington's force consisted of five foot companies, but four of them were inexperienced levies recently raised in England. The only experienced foot company was that of Captain Loftus, whose men were mostly Irish. The companies were organised into a regiment under the command of Sir Alexander Radcliffe. To this was added fifty horsemen commanded by Captain Charles Montague. Harrington wanted to take his troops out to scout the Irish fortifications on the ford of the Avonmore River at Rathdrum, and possibly to give his raw troops some experience in field craft. His first attempt to view the Irish position on 28 May failed. Harrington returned to his camp about a mile from the ford. A second effort to view the Irish fortifications was made on 28 May, but this was turned back due to poor weather. Harrington ordered the men to march back to Wicklow town.

== The battle ==
The English army stretched out in a column; in the lead was the van, then the baggage, followed by the battle and then the rear. Captain Atherton, the Sergeant-Major of the army, had little doubt that the weight of any Irish attack would fall on the rear of the column. Thus, the horse (cavalry) were placed at the rear. The army had marched little over a mile before the Irish shot (musketeers and caliver-men) began skirmishing with the rear of Harrington's force. The Irish tried to take a ford to block the advance, but the English secured the crossing, with the shot of the English rear skirmishing with the Irish, allowing the rest of the army to pass unhindered.

The march continued two miles to another ford, with the rear continuing to hold O'Byrne's Irish shot at bay. Again the English shot secured the crossing, as Irish fire slackened, possibly due to a shortage of gunpowder. Harrington placed 40–50 shot behind an earthen bank on the left flank of the column on the far side of the ford. The Irish brought up a stand of pikemen, but their attack was limited to the English left, as the right of the column was shielded by thick gorse bushes. Atherton gathered 60–80 men to counter-attack the Irish pike. The English shot behind the bank were to hold their fire until Atherton attacked, but instead prematurely fired a single volley at the Irish pike then abandoned their position. Without the support from their shot, Atherton's men refused to charge the Irish, then withdrew to the main body of the English column.

Atherton found that the English shot had fled the column, abandoning the main stand of English pike. Now exposed to Irish gunfire, the English pike became disordered as they pressed to make the river crossing. Exploiting the English confusion, the Irish pike charged into the English rear, killing many without resistance. Montague's English cavalry charged to support the panicking infantry, but the Irish pike square opened, allowing the horse to pass through. The Irish pike speared the English horse as they passed, including Montague who was wounded by a pike thrust to his side. Despite their officers' best efforts, the English soldiers' resistance collapsed. The rout continued with the Irish slaughtering Harrington's men to within one and a half miles of Wicklow town. All the English companies lost their colours, except for Captain Loftus, but they were later recovered by the English horse. After the battle, Radcliffe estimated the English army had lost 250 men killed, missing or deserted.

== Aftermath ==
The first English reports suggested that they lost the battle due to the inexperience of most of their troops. Harrington at first blamed the English pikemen for refusing to fight, but at the court-martial in July, Harrington, supported by two of his officers (Captains Linley and Mallory) blamed Captain Loftus and his Lieutenant Walsh. This was convenient, as Loftus had died from his wounds and could not refute their accusations. Their version was supported by a map drawn of the battle, possibly by Montague (Harrington's nephew). Loftus and Walsh were found guilty by the court-martial. Loftus was already dead but Walsh was executed by firing squad. Mallory and Linley were not found guilty but they were cashiered, losing command of their foot companies. The men in Loftus' company were sentenced to death but this was commuted to decimation by drawing lots. Even by Elizabethan standards this was deemed overly harsh. Though Harrington was not charged with misconduct, he was never given command of a force this size again.

== Bibliography ==
- Timothy R. Jackson,'A Wicklow skirmish in word and image: time and space in TCD MS 1209/12', in Words and image: a journal of verbal/visual enquiry, 21:1, pp 56–78
- Daniel MacCarthy, 'The disaster of Wicklow', The journal of the Kilkenny and south-east of Ireland archaeological society, vol. 2, no. 2 (1859), pp 428–40.
- James O'Neill, The Nine Years War, 1593-1603: O'Neill, Mountjoy and the Military Revolution (Dublin, 2017).
