= Richard Longworth (academic) =

English churchman

Richard Longworth (died 1579) was an English churchman and academic. He served as master of St John's College, Cambridge from 1564 to 1569, having been removed for his Puritan views, and then as Dean of Chester from 1572 until his death.

== Life ==
He was from Lancashire, and matriculated as a pensioner at St John's College in 1549. He graduated B.A. in 1553, M.A. in 1556, B.D. in 1563, and D.D. in 1567. He became a Fellow of Queens' College, Cambridge for the period 1553 to 1557; and a Fellow of St John's from 1559. He was university preacher in 1561, and Vice-Chancellor from 1567 to 1568.

Having been elected Master of St John's in 1564, he was deprived of the position in 1569, by Richard Cox, the bishop of Ely, as College Visitor. Longworth's religious views were Puritan, and under his leadership St John's had become a major Puritan force in the university. The college's sympathies were manifested in the refusal of the Master and others to wear the surplice in chapel, and Longworth was summoned to London to explain himself. Longworth was allied with William Fulke, and Richard Curteys laid a complaint against both of them in 1565; later they fell out, and Fulke headed the faction opposed to Longworth. The Visitor's intervention was prompted by the feuding in the college, and Fulke had to pull back, missing his own chance at the mastership.

As Dean of Chester, appointed 1573, he was an absentee. He was a non-resident rector of Cockfield, Suffolk from 1567, and was succeeded by John Knewstub, of similar views.

== Notes ==
Academic offices
Preceded by Leonard Pilkington	Master of St John's College, Cambridge; 1564–1569	Succeeded by Nicholas Sheppard
