= Leonard Pilkington =

English academic and clergyman

Leonard Pilkington (1527–1599) was an English academic and clergyman. A Marian exile, he became Regius Professor of Divinity at Cambridge and Master of St John's College, Cambridge at the start of the reign of Elizabeth I. In his subsequent church career, he followed the way opened when his brother James Pilkington became Bishop of Durham.

== Life ==
He was born at Rivington, Lancashire, and graduated B.A. at St John's College in 1544. He became a Fellow there in 1546, and graduated M.A. in 1547. When Mary I of England came to the throne, he was deprived of his college positions, and left the country. While in exile he married.

He returned to England and was restored to his fellowship at St John's, his wife having died. He became Master there in 1561, replacing his brother James and initiating a period of divisive governance and an effort to reform the college by replacing Catholic associations with the Protestantism of Geneva. He brought in William Fulke as Fellow, and ensured the succession of Richard Longworth, and then resigned as Master. He became a canon of Durham Cathedral in 1567.

== Notes ==
Academic offices
Preceded by James Pilkington	Regius Professor of Divinity at Cambridge; 1561–1562	Succeeded by Matthew Hutton
Preceded by James Pilkington	Master of St John's College, Cambridge; 1561–1564	Succeeded by Richard Longworth
