= Edward Trollope =

British bishop

- Suffragan Bishop of Nottingham
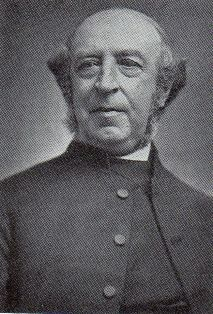
- Installed: 1877
- Term ended: 1893
- Predecessor: Henry Mackenzie
- Successor: Not replaced

Personal details
- Born: 1817
- Died: 1893 (aged 75–76)
- Denomination: Church of England

Edward Trollope (15 April 1817 – 10 December 1893) was an antiquary and an Anglican Bishop of Nottingham in the Victorian era.

== Family background ==
Trollope was born at Uffington, near Stamford in Lincolnshire, on 15 April 1817, the sixth son of Sir John Trollope, of Casewick Hall, Uffington, and his wife, Anne, the daughter of Henry Thorold of Cuxwold, Lincolnshire. He was thus second cousin to the writer Anthony Trollope, as well as a cousin to future Bishop of Winchester, Anthony Wilson Thorold.

== Career ==
Educated at Eton College and at Christ Church, Oxford, Trollope returned to Lincolnshire to become vicar of Rauceby in 1841. In 1843, his maternal relative, Sir John Thorold, appointed him to the rectory of Leasingham, Lincolnshire, and he held this living for fifty years. In 1867, he was collated to the archdeaconry of Stow. The high point of his career in the church came in 1877, when he was made Bishop of Nottingham. It was to a large extent the result of Trollope’s hard work as a fundraiser that the new see of Southwell, was established in 1884. Despite Trollope's efforts at the restoration of the Great Hall, next to Southwell Minster, as a Bishop's Palace, the Ecclesiastical Commissioners thought it unfit for purpose and the first Bishop of Southwell lived for a time at Thurgarton Priory. Though Nottingham was included in the new Diocese of Southwell, Trollope retained the See of Nottingham and remained suffragan bishop for the Diocese of Lincoln until his death.

== Antiquarian and historical interests ==
Trollope was particularly interested in architecture and antiquities. He became a member of the Lincolnshire Diocesan Architectural Society in 1855, and became its editorial secretary in 1857 and its Chairman in 1867. He was an active writer and researcher with several books and many articles published. He is now mainly remembered as the author of Sleaford and the Wapentakes of Flaxwell and Aswardhurn in the County of Lincoln (1872). He also wrote a life of Pope Adrian IV (1856), a manual of sepulchral memorials (1858), a work on ancient and medieval labyrinths and turf mazes (1858), and genealogies of the Thorold and Trollope families (1874 and 1875).

== Personal life ==
Trollope married twice, and had two daughters by his first marriage. He died at his home, Leasingham Rectory, on 10 December 1893, and was buried at Leasingham on 14 December.

Church of England titles
Preceded by Henry Mackenzie	Suffragan Bishop of Nottingham; 1877 –1893	Succeeded by Not replaced
