= Nicholas Sheppard =

Nicholas Sheppard (or Shepherd) (died 1587) was an English churchman and academic, Master of St John's College, Cambridge and Archdeacon of Northampton.

== Life ==
He was a native of Westmoreland. He was admitted scholar of his college, 4 July 1549, and fellow 25 March 1553; being, however, ejected in the following year, he did not commence M.A. until 1558. In 1561 he was elected a minor fellow of Trinity College; in 1562 he was elected a senior fellow, and successively filled the offices of senior bursar (1562-3) and vice-master (1564-8) on the same foundation. On 14 November 1561 he was appointed one of the university preachers. He proceeded B.D. in 1568, and was admitted Master of St John's 17 December 1569.

He was admitted archdeacon of Northampton in 1571; but his tenure of the mastership was cut short, for reasons that remain partly obscure, and he left the position in 1574. Subsequent proceedings and articles preferred against him appear to point to non-residence as the only charge that was actually substantiated; there was a later college tradition that he had tried to enrich himself by college business; and there may also have been religious tensions, since according to John Strype he was brought into the mastership by the party which supported John Whitgift, and Thomas Baker points to the discontinuation of the Genevan psalters during his tenure. But Strype adduces evidence suggesting at a later time his views were more Calvinist or puritan.

== Notes ==
Academic offices
Preceded by Richard Longworth	Master of St John's College, Cambridge; 1569–1574	Succeeded by John Still
