= Anglican Bishop of Nottingham =

Anglican suffragan bishop in England

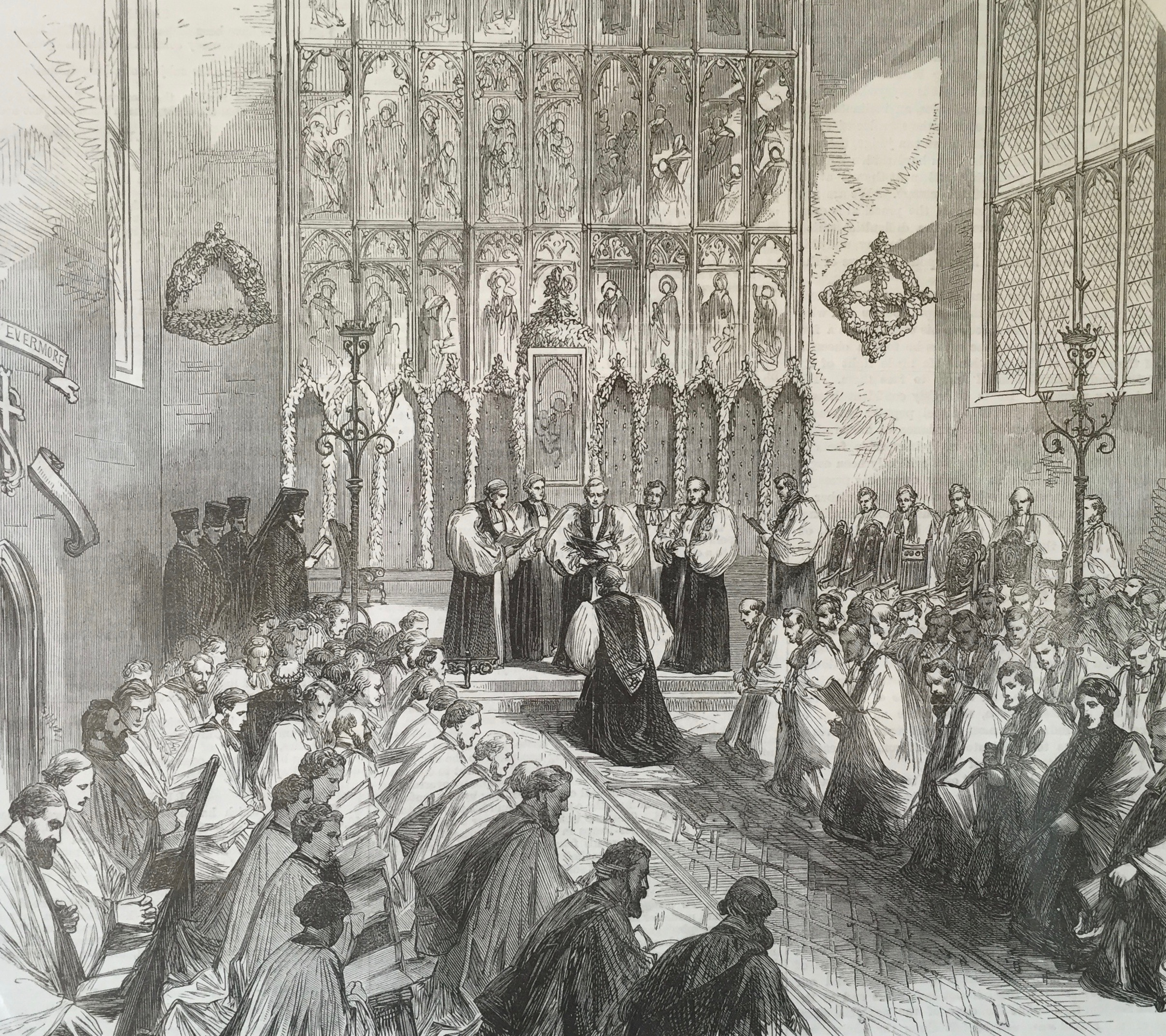
Consecration of Henry Mackenzie on 2 February 1870 in St Mary's Church, Nottingham

The Anglican Bishop of Nottingham was an episcopal title used by a Church of England suffragan bishop. The title took its name after the county town of Nottingham and was first created under the Suffragan Bishops Act 1534. Until 1837, Nottingham had been part of the Diocese of York, when it then became part of the Diocese of Lincoln. With the creation of the Diocese of Southwell in 1884, Nottingham became part of that diocese, but the then- (and final) bishop remained suffragan to Lincoln. Since 2005, Nottingham has given its name to the Diocese of Southwell and Nottingham.

== List of suffragan bishops ==
Anglican Bishops of Nottingham
From	Until	Incumbent	Notes
1567	1570	Richard Barnes	Translated to Carlisle, and later to Durham
1570	1870	in abeyance	
1870	1877	Henry Mackenzie	
1877	1893	Edward Trollope	Archdeacon of Stow and Rector of Leasingham; died in post.
1893	2005	in abeyance	
Since 2005, Nottingham has been part of the title for the diocesan Bishop of Southwell and Nottingham

== See also ==
- Archdeacon of Nottingham
