= Henry Mackenzie (bishop) =

- Bishop of Nottingham
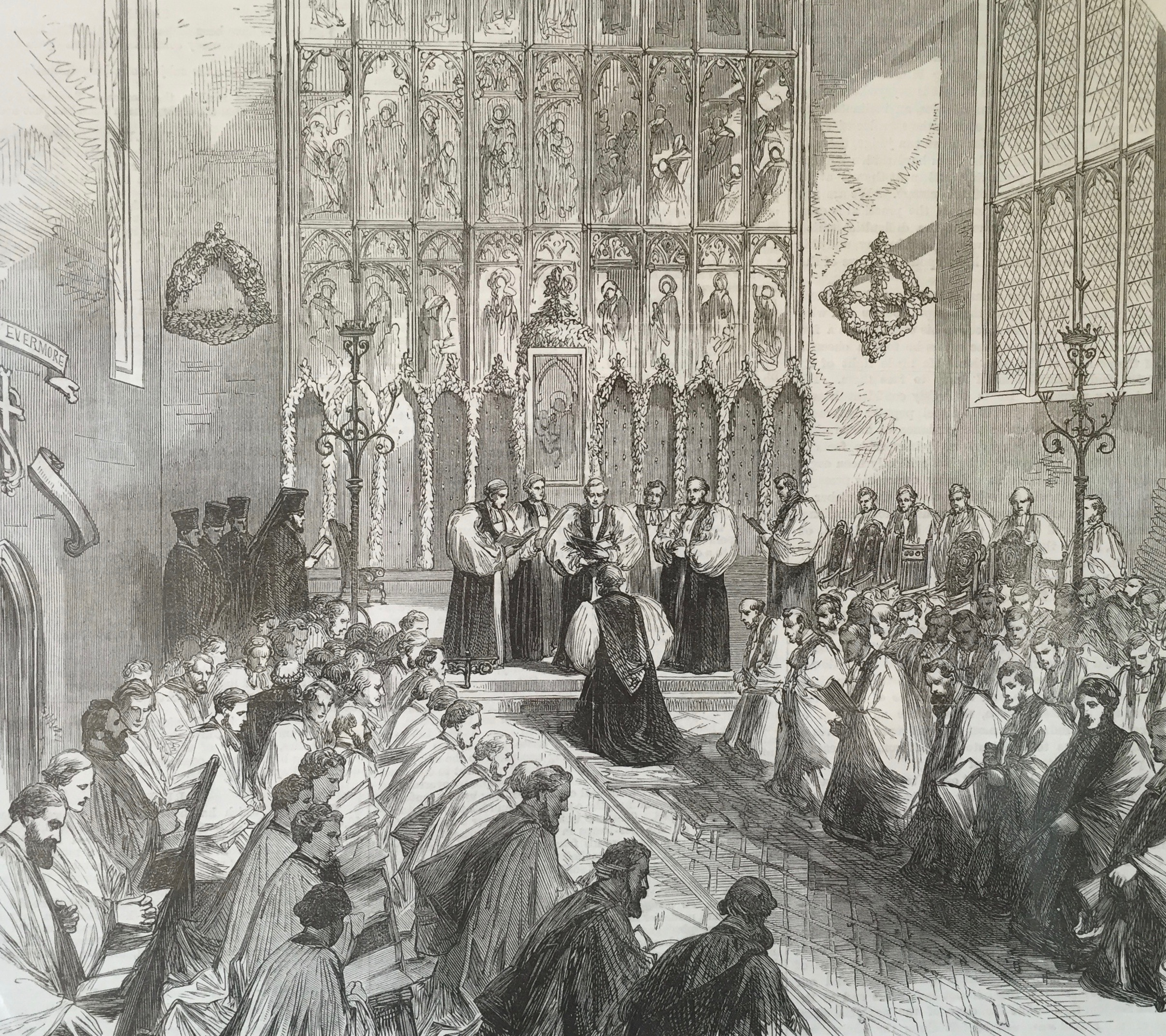
- Mackenzie consecration in St Mary's Church, Nottingham
- Diocese: Diocese of Lincoln
- In office: 1870–1877
- Successor: Edward Trollope
- Other post: Archdeacon of Nottingham (1865–?)

Orders
- Ordination: 1834
- Consecration: 2 February 1870

Personal details
- Born: 16 May 1808 Coleman Street, London
- Died: 15 October 1878 (aged 70) Settlement, County, Country
- Buried: South Collingham
- Denomination: Anglican
- Education: Merchant Taylors' School

Henry Mackenzie (16 May 1808 – 15 October 1878) was Bishop of Nottingham (a suffragan bishop in the Diocese of Lincoln) from 1870 until 1877. He became the first suffragan bishop in the Church of England since 1608.

== Life ==
Mackenzie was born — the fourth and youngest son of John Mackenzie, merchant, descended from the Mackenzie clan of Torridon in Ross-shire — in King's Arms Yard, Coleman Street, London, on 16 May 1808. He was educated at the Merchant Taylors' School under Thomas Cherry.

Owing to the death of his father he left school early, and engaged for some years in commercial pursuits; but in 1830 he entered Pembroke College, Oxford, where he had Francis Jeune, subsequently Bishop of Peterborough, as his tutor, and formed a lifelong friendship with John Jackson, afterwards Bishop of Lincoln and then of London. He took an honorary fourth class in 1884, graduating Oxford Master of Arts (MA Oxon) in 1838 and Doctor of Divinity (DD) in 1869.

In 1834, he was ordained to the curacy of Wool and Lulworth, on the south coast of Dorset, and in the next year accepted a temporary engagement as chaplain to the English residents at Rotterdam. Charles James Blomfield, Bishop of London, came to Rotterdam to confirm, and at once discerned his high gifts and promise. Returning to England, Mackenzie in 1836 became curate of St Peter's Church, Walworth, whence he removed in 1837 to the mastership of Bancroft's Hospital, Mile End, and becoming secretary to the committee for the erection of ten new churches in Bethnal Green contributed largely to the success of that enterprise. In 1840, he was made incumbent of the densely populated riverside parish of St James's, Bermondsey. While at Bermondsey he gained the friendship of Frederick Denison Maurice, then chaplain of Guy's Hospital. Maurice recommended him to George Pellew, Dean of Norwich, for the important cure of Great Yarmouth, to which he was appointed in 1844. Mackenzie was recalled to London, to the rectory of St. Martin's-in-the-Fields, by Blomfield in 1848. In 1865, he was appointed by Robert Rolfe, 1st Baron Cranworth, Lord Chancellor to the well-endowed living of Tydd St. Mary, in the Fens of Lincolnshire, near Wisbech. His college friend, John Jackson, who in 1853 had succeeded John Kaye as Bishop of Lincoln, made him one of his examining chaplains in 1855, and in 1858 collated him to the prebendal stall of Leighton Ecclesia at Lincoln Cathedral, once held by George Herbert. As bishop's chaplain he delivered courses of lectures on pastoral work to the candidates for holy orders, which were published in 1863.

On the appointment of James Jeremie as Dean of Lincoln in 1864, Mackenzie succeeded him as subdean and canon residentiary, and on the death of George Wilkins in 1866 was appointed to succeed him as Archdeacon of Nottingham, exchanging the lucrative living of Tydd for the poorly endowed rectory of St John the Baptist's Church, Collingham, near Newark, in order that he might become resident within his archdeaconry. In 1870, the long-dormant office of bishop suffragan was revived in him on the nomination of Christopher Wordsworth, Jackson's successor as Bishop of Lincoln, and he was consecrated as Bishop of Nottingham at St Mary's Church, Nottingham, by Jackson on the feast of the Purification, 2 February 1870. The revival of the office of bishop suffragan, after more than three centuries' suspension, was not at first popular (Mackenzie was the first so consecrated, although Edward Parry's appointment as Bishop of Dover was almost contemporaneous). The county of Nottingham especially was disposed to regard itself slighted on being made over to the care of a 'curate-bishop.' But, careful never to overstep his subordinate relations to his diocesan, Mackenzie maintained the office with true dignity, and secured for it general respect. In 1871, he exchanged Collingham for the perpetual curacy of Scofton, near Worksop, which he also resigned in 1873 to devote himself exclusively to his episcopal duties. These he continued to fulfil till growing years and infirmities led to his resignation at the beginning of 1878.

He died, almost suddenly, on 15 October 1878, and was buried at South Collingham.

== Family ==
Mackenzie was twice married: first, to Elizabeth, daughter of Robert Ridley, esq., of Essequibo, by whom he had one daughter; and, secondly, to Antoinette, daughter of James H. Turing, sometime her majesty's consul at Rotterdam, by whom he left six sons and five daughters.

== Sources ==
This article incorporates text from a publication now in the public domain: Venables, Edmund (1893). "Mackenzie, Henry (1808-1878)". In Lee, Sidney (ed.). Dictionary of National Biography. Vol. 35. London: Smith, Elder & Co.

Church of England titles
Preceded by in abeyance	Bishop of Nottingham; 1870–1877	Succeeded by Edward Trollope
