= Felim McFiach O'Byrne =

Féilim mac Fiach Ó Broin (died 1630) was the son of Fiach mac Aodh Ó Broin and Rose O'Toole. He was a Gaelic chieftain who in 1600 submitted to Elizabeth I of England therefore ending the long lasting reign of the O'Byrne clan over County Wicklow. O'Byrne held the office of Member of Parliament (M.P.) for County Wicklow in 1613. O'Byrne married Winifred O'Toole and together they had eight sons and one daughter and was succeeded by his eldest son Brian McFelim O'Byrne.

Felim O'Byrne died in January 24, 1631, at Ballinacor Co. Wicklow.
