= Great House Barn =

Great House Barn, Rivington
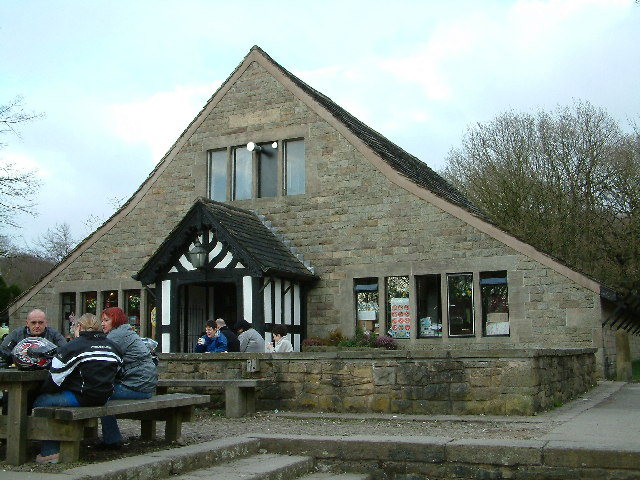
- Great House Barn, Rivington

- Location within the Borough of Chorley

General information
- Type: Barn
- Location: Rivington, Lancashire, England
- Coordinates: 53.620°N 2.562°W

Listed Building – Grade II
- Designated: 22 October 1952
- Reference no.: 1362125

Great House Barn is a 16th-century barn and Listed building in Rivington, Lancashire, England. Built as a tithe barn it is believed to be one of the oldest of its type in the county and is a Grade II listed building.

== History ==
Built using cruck framing of oak, the original building is of, at the latest, 16th-century construction, but is likely to be older. Major changes were made to the building by Thomas Anderton, the owner in 1702. The west gable of the barn is dated 1702 but is possibly older and has the initials A TAR (Thomas, Alice, and Robert Anderton). By the early 20th century the Rivington Hall, farm and barns were owned by Lord Leverhulme and on his instructions the architect Jonathan Simpson made further substantial alterations to the barn. Architecturally, the barn is as Leverhulme had it restored, with the cruck beams infilled with sandstone block walls and a slate roof. The Tudor-style timber-framed porch and mullion windows are 20th-century additions

During the Second World War the barn was used by the Ministry of Agriculture, Fisheries and Food as a food storage depot.

The barn is owned by Salmons and is a cafe and forms part of an information centre about the Leverhulme estate.
