= Listed buildings in Rivington =

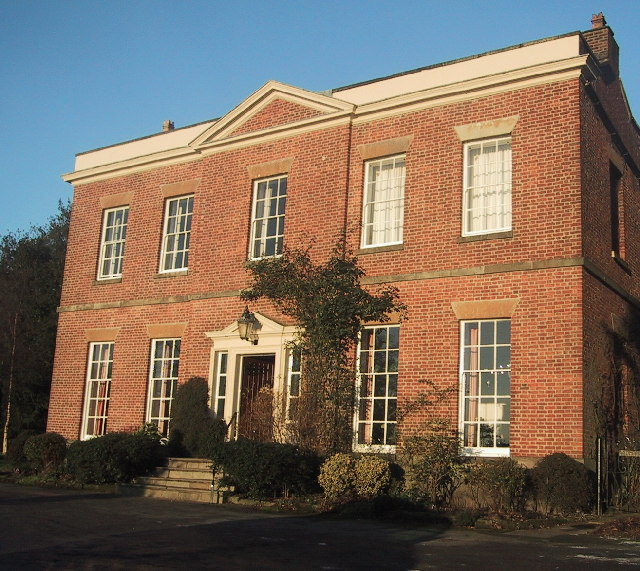
Rivington Hall, in Lever Park, Rivington

Rivington in the Borough of Chorley, Lancashire, is situated on the edge of the West Pennine Moors, at the foot of Rivington Pike overlooking reservoirs created for Liverpool Corporation Waterworks in the 19th century. There are twenty eight listed buildings within Rivington, two are classified by English Heritage as Grade II*, the rest as Grade II; Rivington has no Grade I Listed buildings.

Rivington village is a conservation area, designated under section 69 of the Planning (Listed Buildings and Conservation Areas) Act 1990; almost half the houses in the village centre have listed status. Rivington's buildings are varied, reflecting its rural and historic nature, and include former hand-loom weavers' cottages, the church, and the chapel. Locally sourced stone for walls and slate for roofs are the predominant building materials, used for places of worship, the school, houses (including many not listed), and boundary dry stone walls. An exception is Fisher House, a three-storey Georgian rendered building.

Rivington Hall, a former manor house with an imposing red brick Georgian frontage, is a short distance from the village centre. Its barn, and the barn at Great House Farm were renovated and converted by the architect Jonathan Simpson for William Lever in 1904. The barns were used for catering for the early tourist industry, a function they retain today. Farmhouses and their barns scattered outside the village centre, also built in local gritstone, are also listed.

Most of the remaining listed structures are in the listed historic landscape of Lever Park, a country park created for William Lever by Thomas Mawson in the early 20th century, the park includes Rivington Pike summit and the Pike tower, built in 1733 for Robert Andrews. . They include an unfinished replica of Liverpool Castle, overlooking the Lower Rivington Reservoir. Outside the park on the hillside are the terraced gardens, being the remains of Leverhulmes private gardens in his country retreat, once used for sport of shooting. The latter includes the Pigeon Tower, which is a large folly and former dovecote.

The term "listed building", in the United Kingdom, refers to a building or structure designated as being of special architectural, historical, or cultural significance. They are categorised in three grades: Grade I consists of buildings of outstanding architectural or historical interest, Grade II* includes significant buildings of more than local interest and Grade II consists of buildings of special architectural or historical interest. Buildings in England are listed by the Secretary of State for Culture, Media and Sport on recommendations provided by English Heritage, which also determines the grading.

== Key ==
Grade	Criteria
II*	Particularly important buildings of more than special interest.
II	Buildings of national importance and special interest.

== Listed buildings and structures ==
Name and location	Photograph	Grade	Date	Notes
Rivington Church; 53.6252°N 2.5685°W		II	1. 1541; 2. 1666 (rebuilt); 3. 19th century (restoration)	The church, located in Rivington village is built of irregularly coursed sandstone with quoins and a slate roof. It is a small plain building with a 19th-century gabled porch and an octagonal bell turret with a conical roof and weathervane.
Bellhouse; 53.6252°N 2.5688°W		II	16th century	The bellhouse, being part of the church site, is a small, square, single-storey building with a basement and outside steps. It is built in sandstone with a stone slate roof. It is reputed to have been built to hold a large bell which is now missing.
Great House Barn; 53.6202°N 2.5627°W		II	1.16th century 2. 1905 (restoration)	The barn, located within Lever Park is dated 1702, probably from a restoration or rebuilding. It was restored, altered, and enlarged in 1905. It has an exposed oak cruck frame, clad in squared sandstone and stone slate roof. The Tudor-style timber-framed porch and mullion windows are 20th-century additions.
Rivington Hall Barn; 53.6256°N 2.5561°W		II	1.16th century 2. 1905 (restoration)	The former Tithe barn is the larger of the two converted barns within Lever Park and is of varying build dates, thought to be mainly 16th century and then restored, altered, and enlarged in 1905. It has an oak cruck frame that has been exposed inside. The walls are clad in coursed sandstone, and it has a stone slate roof and mullion windows.
Hamer's Cottage; 53.6078°N 2.5573°W	—	II	1. 17th century or earlier 2. 18th century (altered)	This house is a former farmhouse built of sandstone with quoins and stone slate roof, located at Dryfield Lane, Rivington. Part of the house has cruck frame construction.
Great House Farmhouse and Cottage; 53.6200°N 2.5625°W		II	1. 17th century farmhouse 2. 18th century cottage	The farmhouse, built from squared sandstone with quoins with a stone slate roof and mullion windows, dates from the 17th century, it serves as an information centre and location of public toilets for Lever Park. The cottage dates from the 18th century and is built in similar materials. Great House Farm now houses an information centre.
Wilcocks Farmhouse; 53.6353°N 2.5577°W		II	1. 1670; 2. 19th century (extended)	Willcock's is a farmhouse built in coursed sandstone rubble with quoins at the corners, it has a tiled roof with two chimneys, mullion windows, and is dated on the door lintel.
Bradley's Farmhouse; 53.6315°N 2.5614°W	—	II	1683	Bradley's is a two-storey farmhouse built of sandstone with quoins and a stone slate roof, the date is on the door lintel, it has mullion windows to the second floor. The farm is a small holding of 103 acre.
Barn, East of Bradley's Farmhouse; 53.6317°N 2.5609°W	—	II	1737	The barn, which has a shippon or cow shed, is built in sandstone with a stone slate roof. There is an owl hole above the loading door to the loft.
Moses Cocker's Farmhouse; 53.6325°N 2.5494°W		II	1693	Moses Cocker's is a former farmhouse and built of coursed rubble sandstone with quoins, a stone slate roof with gable coping and it is dated on the door lintel. The building underwent alterations in 2015 to become a residence, it had been bought by United Utilities who retained the land after selling the building.
Rivington Hall; 53.6252°N 2.5562°W		II*	1. 1694; 2. 1700; 3. 1774	Rivington Hall, once the museum within Lever Park is an old manor house, the oldest part of which, at the rear, is dated 1694 and replaced a 15th-century timber-framed house. The front, rebuilt in 1774, has two storeys in classical Georgian style with five bays, a central doorway, sash windows, pediment and parapet. It is a private residence.
Rivington Unitarian Chapel; 53.6259°N 2.5656°W		II*	1703	The chapel, located in the village is a rectangular sandstone building with a hexagonal gable end bellcote and stone slate roof. Inside it retains its old box pews and has a five-sided pulpit.
Rivington Pike Tower; 53.6194°N 2.5413°W		II	1733	The Pike tower, built of gritstone, sits on the hill summit of Rivington Pike, which is a detached part of Lever Park, built as a hunting lodge, the foundation stones are from an ancient beacon. It is approximately 5 by 5 metres (16 by 16 ft) square and 7 metres high. Original features such as its cellar, stone flagged floor, chimney and fireplace have long since been removed. Its datestone went missing during the 1970s in a period of significant neglect.
Mounting block in school yard 53.6244°N 2.5679°W		II	18th century (possibly)	The mounting block is a circular sandstone platform, with a stone post in the centre and two steps. It is in the old Rivington Grammar School yard within the village.
Fisher House; 53.6253°N 2.5649°W		II	1763	The building sits in a secluded and private position within the village and is a three-storey stucco on brick house with stone dressings and stone slate roof with gable chimneys, the door has a fanlight and the house has sash windows. Originally built in 1763 for the Reverend John Fisher and later becoming a Temperance Hotel before reverting to a private residence.
Wilkinson's and attached cottage 53.6249°N 2.5652°W		II	1. 1788; 2. 19th century	The pair of cottages is built in sandstone with slate roofs, one has horizontal three light windows, the other has two higher storeys with sash windows.
Loggia c. 70 metres west of Pigeon tower in Lord Leverhulme's Terraced Gardens; 53.6242°N 2.5473°W		II	1906	The remains of a loggia with arches overlooking a former boating lake in the Terraced Gardens, a former private gardens designed by Thomas Mawson for William Lever.
Two archways in Lord Leverhulme's Terraced Gardens; 53.6233°N 2.5471°W		II	1906	These archways are an intact element of the remains of private gardens designed by Thomas Mawson for Leverhulme's Rivington Bungalow.
Pigeon Tower north east corner of Lord Leverhulme's Terraced Garden; 53.6243°N 2.5463°W		II	1910	The Pigeon Tower was built in gritstone with four storeys, each a single room., on the boundary of the Terraced Gardens. It has a steeply pitched roof and a corbelled chimney. On the west side is a semi-circular stair turret with a conical roof. The fourth storey, a sitting room, has four light mullioned windows on two sides. The second and third storeys are a dovecote. On the west wall are square pigeon holes with perching ledges.
Seven Arch Bridge in Lord Leverhulme's Terraced Gardens; 53.6235°N 2.5485°W		II	1910	The bridge, crossing over Royton Road within the Terraced Gardens has random sandstone rubble walls and round stone slate arches and parapets. The large round archway is crossed by six small arches. It carries a footpath over an old roadway. In memoirs recalling after dinner stories the second viscount Leverhulme thought the bridge design was influenced by one in Nigeria, however no similar bridge exists there and is more likely the design is based on the Pont du Gard, France.
Rivington Castle; 53.6125°N 2.5630°W		II	1912 to 1925	The replica smaller-scale ruin of Liverpool Castle is a folly built for Lord Leverhulme in gritstone close to the Lower Rivington Reservoir as a feature of Lever Park; the build was never completed, stopping on Leverhulme's death in 1925. The current owner, United Utilities, authorised Rivington Heritage Trust to carry out significant alterations on its stonework in 2012.
