= Rivington Park School =

Coordinates: 53.611°N 2.552°W

Rivington Park Independent School
- Rivington, Lancashire; United Kingdom

Information
- Established: 2004
- Founder: Michael Ruaux
- Closed: 12 December 2014
- Ofsted: Reports
- Age: 5 to 16

Rivington Park Independent School was a private school located in Rivington, Lancashire that closed in 2014. It was founded in 2004 by Michael Ruaux. Ruaux also founded Rivington Park Fencing Club, which continues to operate.

The school provided day-school education for children aged five to sixteen. The school had nearly closed in 2009 but was rescued by injection of funds from parents. The school also offered GCSE and BTEC courses for senior pupils and had plans to provide A-Level courses for sixth form pupils as well as boarding provision in what had been the school's nursery. The nursery closed down following an adverse Ofsted report published on 3 January 14 prompted by "concern raised with Ofsted regarding child ratios, supervision and the effectiveness of the key person system". The rest of the school closed without warning to staff or parents on 12 December 2014 at which time it had about 35 pupils on roll.
