= Phoebe Hesketh =

British writer

Phoebe Hesketh (29 January 1909 – 25 February 2005) was an English poet from Lancashire notable for her poems depicting nature.

== Life and writing ==
Phoebe Hesketh was born in Preston, Lancashire. Her father was the pioneer radiologist Arthur E. Rayner; her mother was a violinist in the Hallé Orchestra. Among her aunts was the suffragette Edith Rigby. She was educated at Cheltenham Ladies' College, but left at the age of 17 to care for her ill mother. She married Aubrey Hesketh, the director of a mill, in 1931 when she was 22 and they lived in Rivington, Lancashire. Her first collection, Poems, was published in 1939 by Sherratt & Hughes, Manchester, although she later disowned the work to some extent.

During World War II Hesketh worked as the woman's page editor of the Bolton Evening News. In 1948 she published her second volume of poetry, Lean Forward, Spring!, (London: Sidgwick and Jackson), which earned her widespread acclaim amongst the literary community, including from Siegfried Sassoon. During her career she produced sixteen books and, although she never achieved popular success, was championed by several well-known figures including Sassoon, Roy Campbell, and Al Alvarez.

After the war she was a freelance lecturer, poetry teacher and journalist, producing many articles for journals and scripts for the BBC. Her collected poems were gathered together in Netting the Sun: new and collected poems (Petersfield: Enitharmon Press, 1989). Her poetry for younger readers was published in A Song of Sunlight (Chatto, 1974) and in Six of the Best (Puffin, 1989). She was elected a Fellow of the Royal Society of Literature in 1956, and a Fellow of the University of Central Lancashire in 1990.

For almost all her life she lived in Lancashire, in a landscape frequently described in her poetry, and in her semi-autobiographical prose books Rivington: the story of a village (1972) and Village of the Mountain Ash (1990). From her marriage until she was widowed she lived at Rivington, and afterwards at Heath Charnock. She wrote a biography of her aunt Edith Rigby that was published in 1966. The Heskeths had three children. One of her poems describes the death of her young son. She died on 25 February 2005.

== Separately published works ==
- 1939: Poems. Manchester: Sherratt & Hughes
- 1948: Lean Forward, Spring!. London: Sidgwick and Jackson. (Poems)
- 1952: No Time for Cowards. London: Heinemann. (Poems)
- 1954: Out of the Dark. London: Heinemann. (Poems)
- 1956: Between Wheels and Stars. London: Heinemann. (Poems)
- 1958: The Buttercup Children. London: Hart-Davis. (Poems)
- 1966: My Aunt Edith. London: Peter Davies. (Biography)
- 1966: Prayer for Sun. London: Hart-Davis. (Poems)
- 1972: Rivington: the story of a village. London: Peter Davies. (Partly autobiography, partly history.)
- 1974: A Song of Sunlight. London: Chatto & Windus. (Poems)
- 1977: Preparing to Leave. London: Enitharmon Press. (Poems)
- 1980: The Eighth Day. London: Enitharmon Press. (Poems)
- 1985: A Ring of Leaves. Birmingham: Hayloft Press ISBN 0-948764-01-5. (Poems: "Limited ed. of 300 copies, published to celebrate the poet's 75th birthday")
- 1985: What can the Matter Be?. Penzance: United Writers. (Prose)
- 1986: Over the Brook. Leicester: Taxus. (Poems)
- 1989: Six of the Best. Harmondsworth: Penguin Books. (Poems)
- 1989: Netting the Sun: new and collected poems. Petersfield: Enitharmon Press
- 1990: Rivington: village of the mountain ash. Preston: Carnegie. (Partly autobiography, partly history.)
- 1992: Sundowner. London: Enitharmon Press. (Poems)
- 1994: The Leave Train. London: Enitharmon Press. (Poems)
- 1997: A Box of Silver Birch. London: Enitharmon Press. (Poems)
