= Rivington Pike =

Hill in Lancashire, England

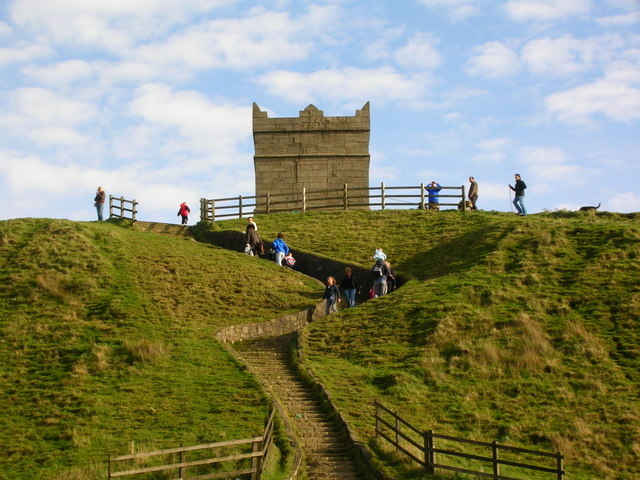

Highest point
- Elevation: 1,191 ft (363 m)
- Prominence: c. 50 ft
- Coordinates: 53°37′11″N 2°32′28″W

Geography
- Location within Lancashire Location within the Borough of Chorley
- Location: Lancashire, England
- Parent range: West Pennine Moors
- OS grid: SD643138
- Topo map: OS Landranger 109

Rivington Pike is a hill on Winter Hill, part of the West Pennine Moors at Rivington in Lancashire, England. The nearest towns are Adlington and Horwich. The land and building are owned and managed by Chorley Council. The Pike Tower is a prominent local landmark located below the summit, it is part of Lever Park. The area is popular with hill walkers and for mountain biking.

== Geography and geology ==
The pike at 1,191 feet (363 m) high is the most westerly high point of Winter Hill in the West Pennine Moors. The high moorland is underlain with Carboniferous rocks, the Millstone Grit, sandstones and shales of the Lower Coal Measures which rise high above the Lancashire Plain to the west and Greater Manchester conurbation to the south.

From the summit it is possible to see Blackpool Tower, the Lake District mountains, the Welsh mountains and as far as the Isle of Man.

== Toponymy ==
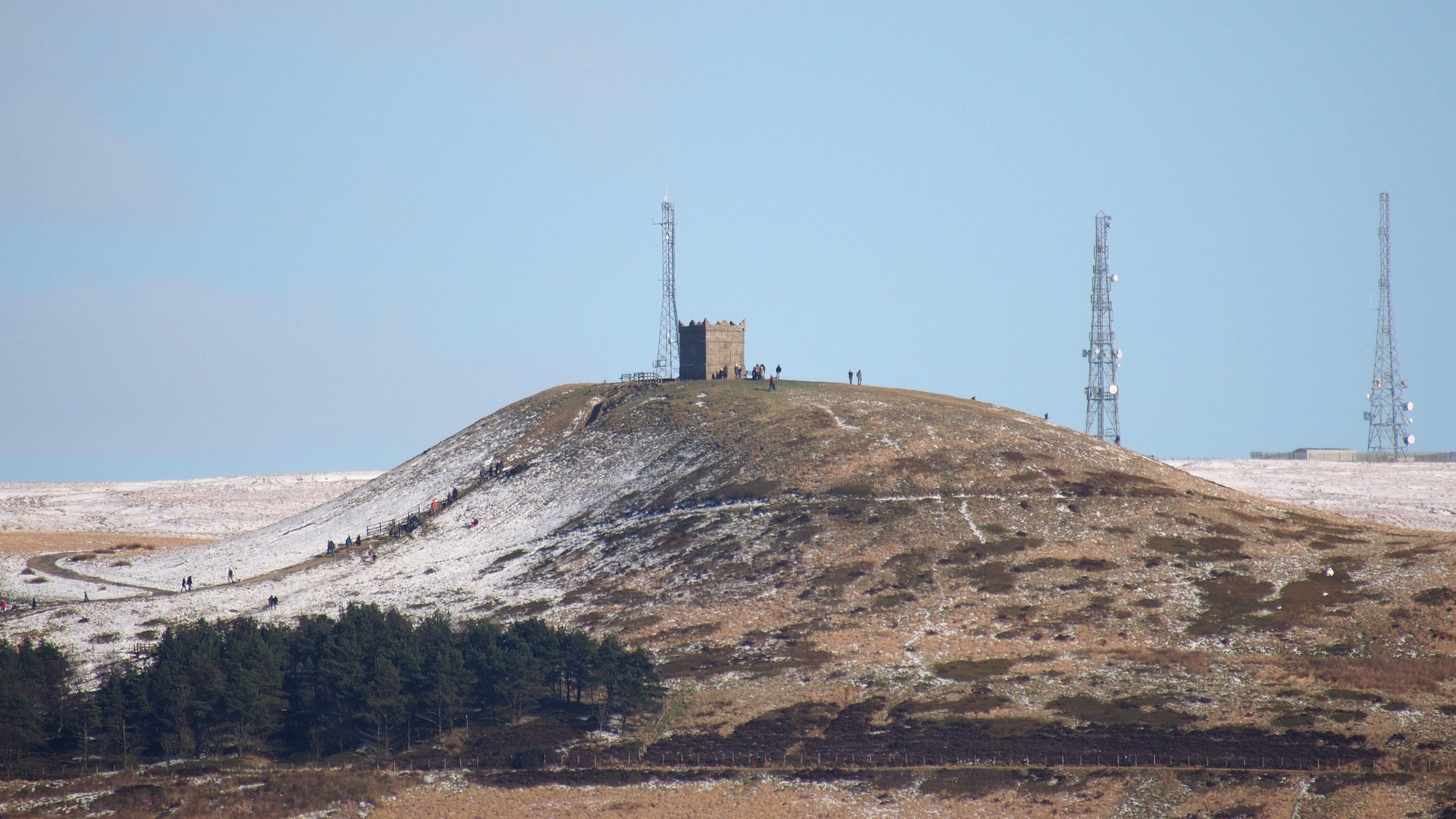
A long-range view of the Pike from the west

The hill had the ancient name in Old English of hreof plus ing meaning the rough or rugged hill and pic, a pointed eminence, the earliest recorded name is Winterhold Pike in 1250 in a grant from Roger Rivington and by 1280 it was known as "Roun pic" within a grant by Cecily Roynton. The hill was recorded as Rovyng in 1325 and Rivenpike in about 1540. Saxton records the name as Rivenpike Hill on his 1577 map.

== History ==
The Pike has many prehistoric sites nearby, at Noon Hill tumulus on Winter Hill, Pike Stones and Two Lads, in the valley is Coblowe hillock by the Lower Rivington Reservoir. There are records of flint chipping being found at the Pike and moorland. A flint spear head was found at the nearby 'Tigers Clough'. There is a feature at the summit of the hill which the author Fergusson Irvine in his 1904 book described as a 'a curious hog-backed mound'. Of the hill he states "no doubt it is mainly a natural feature, but there are distinct traces of its having been trimmed and the approach steepened at several points". and he also states it is possible that a standing stone occupied the summit in the prehistoric period. These remains can be seen from the air.

The Pike was a meeting place of political activists in 1801 through a group known as the United Englishmen, a clandestine revolutionary republican organisation advocating universal suffrage and uprisings across the UK, they sought assistance from the French. Those who attended the gathering were arrested but bailed, they became known as the 'Rivington Hill rioters'. The Pike, being located on Winter Hill was one of the destinations in the UK's largest mass trespass, which occurred in 1896, when 10,000 people marched to enforce their rights of way.

=== Beacon ===
The prominent summit of Rivington Pike hill has a mound with a circular trench, this was the site of one of a series of beacons spanning England as an early warning system. The beacon system was put in place by Ranulph de Blundeville, 4th Earl of Chester around 1139, following a Scottish raid in 1138, when a small Lancashire army was defeated near Clitheroe by a much larger Scottish force. The beacon here was one of the famous examples used in Elizabethan England to warn of the approaching Spanish Armada, lit on 19 July 1588. There are records of a petition for reimbursement of a watching beacon in 1640. The stones from the beacon firepit were used to create a base for the Pike Tower in 1733.

==== 20th century and later ====
Beacons were lit near to the tower for the coronation of King George V in 1911, to celebrate peace after the Great War in 1919, in 1977 and 2012 to celebrate the Silver and Diamond Jubilees of Queen Elizabeth II, and in 2016 for the Queen's 90th birthday. An artificial beacon was lit with projection of the Flag of the United Kingdom onto the Pike Tower, in celebration for the Platinum Jubilee of Elizabeth II in 2022.

=== Tower ===
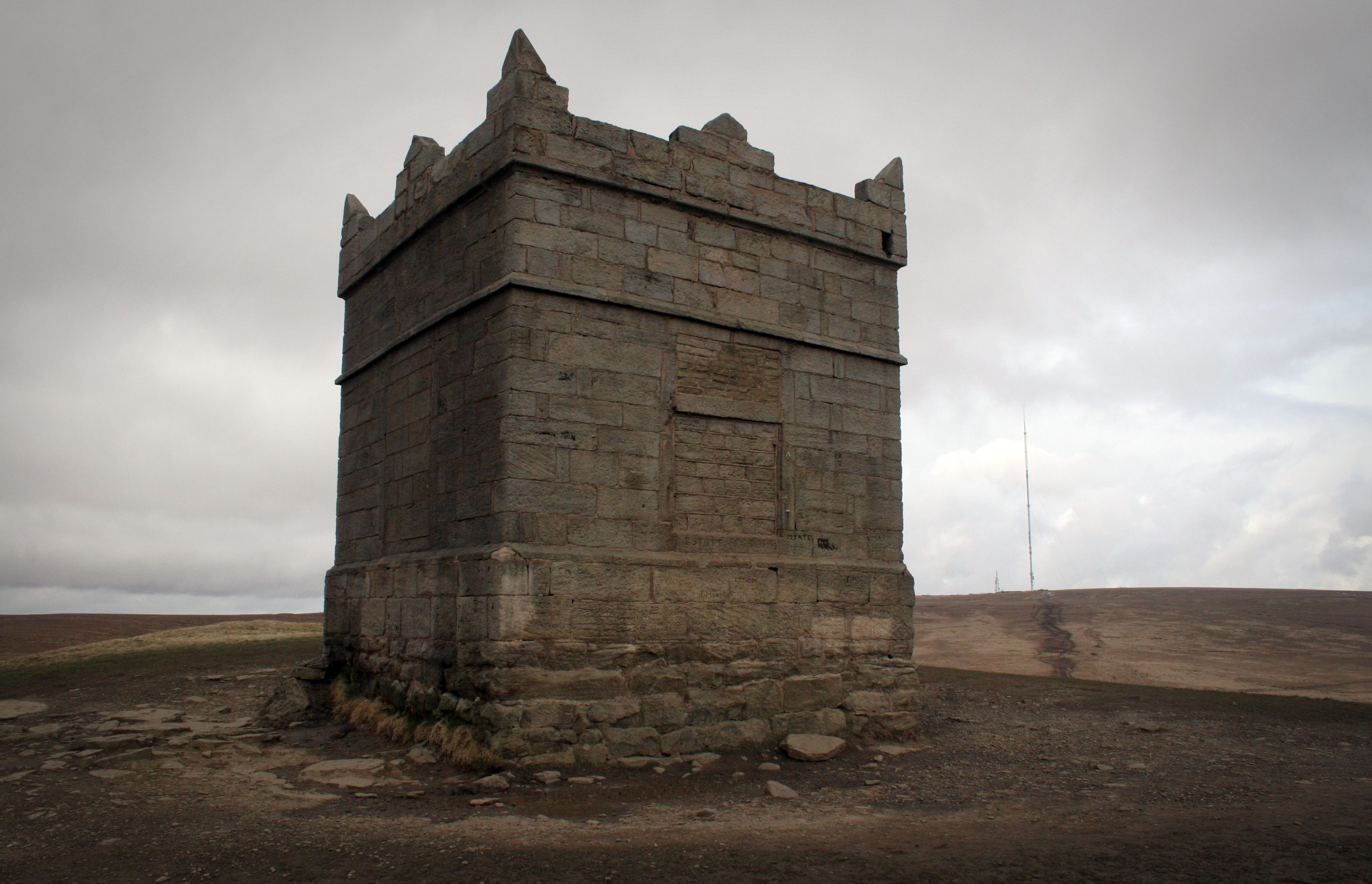
Rivington Pike Tower

The Pike Tower is a Grade II* listed building lower down the Pike hill than the summit, high enough to be prominent from most directions. Built by John Andrews of Rivington Hall in 1733. The Pike hill was the site of an ancient beacon; the tower's foundation is made from stone found there and was built as a hunting lodge. Square in plan with sides 16 feet (4.9 m) in length and 20 feet (6.1 m) high, it was built with a wooden roof, three windows and a door all of which are now blocked up. The foundations have become exposed over centuries due to erosion.

The roof was slate and hidden by a parapet with pointed corners and intermediate steps, originally built with a small cellar measuring 5 by 3 by 5 feet (1.52 m × 0.91 m × 1.52 m), a corner stone fireplace and chimney and stone floor slabs. The materials were brought in by horse and cart from Warrington; windows and glass came from Chorley. The internal features and roof had gone before the rebuild.

Liverpool City Council, the former owner, neglected the tower and planned to demolish it in 1967. After a public outcry, and legal action, the land and building was transferred to Chorley Rural District Council in 1971. The council rebuilt the main external stonework of building in 1974 and completed further work in the 1990s. The Pike Hill and tower are owned and managed by Chorley Council under title number LAN21334.

=== Events ===
Rivington Pike Easter Fair was held annually on Whit Saturday, until the arrival of the Manchester and Bolton Railway's extension to Preston and the opening of Blackrod railway station in 1841 which brought more visitors, after which the Fair was moved to Good Friday in 1900, by then a bank holiday weekend. It has remained popular, with large numbers attending. The fair was stopped during the Covid pandemic for the years 2020 and 2021.

The Rivington Pike Fell Race has been held on the Saturday before Easter Sunday since 1892. The course is 3¼ miles and has a 700-foot ascent. Many walkers continue the Good Friday tradition of walking to the pike summit.

In the years 1906 to 1912, a car and motorcycle race and hill climb was held by the North-East Lancs Automobile Club and the Lancashire Motor-Cycle Club.

=== Past campaigns ===
The Winter Hill mass trespass occurred in 1896, a march of 10,000 people descended on the moorland and up to the Pike from Bolton on two weekends to enforce their rights to roam.

Leverhulme also supported the rights of ordinary people to access the countryside, and used his own funds to secure the rights for the inhabitants. A water bill in 1989 threatened the rights to roam in Rivington, leading to a rally held here to protect rights of access, led by the Ramblers Association. A pledge was made by 3,000 to protect access to the hills. A further attempt by the water company to introduce an act of Parliament in 1997 was rejected after public opposition with the support of the local MP. The Pike and Japanese Gardens, part of the Terraced Gardens, along with the entire moorland are today part of an area of public access land with legally protected rights to roam.

=== Public access ===
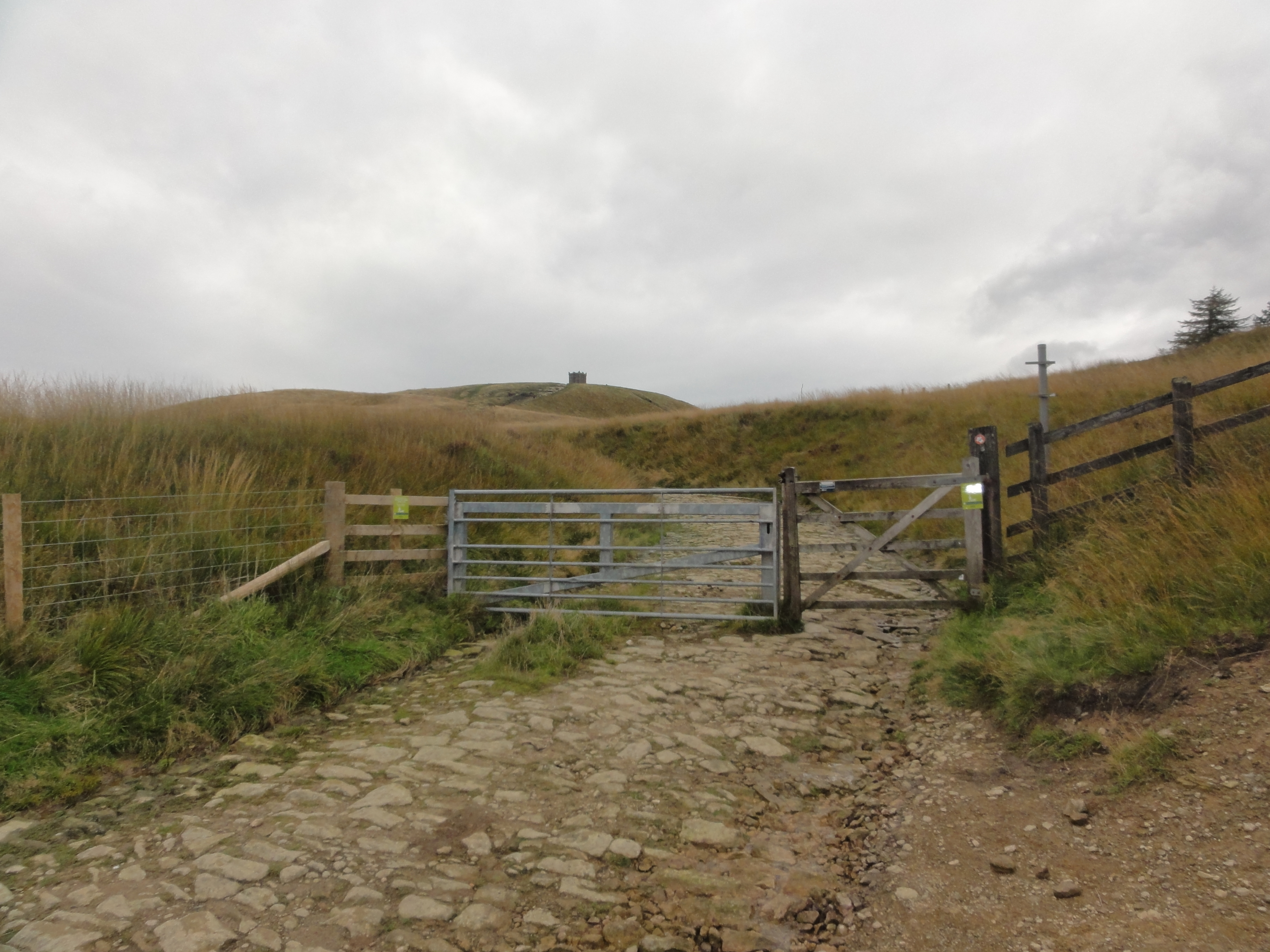
Public Bridleway to the Pike Tower

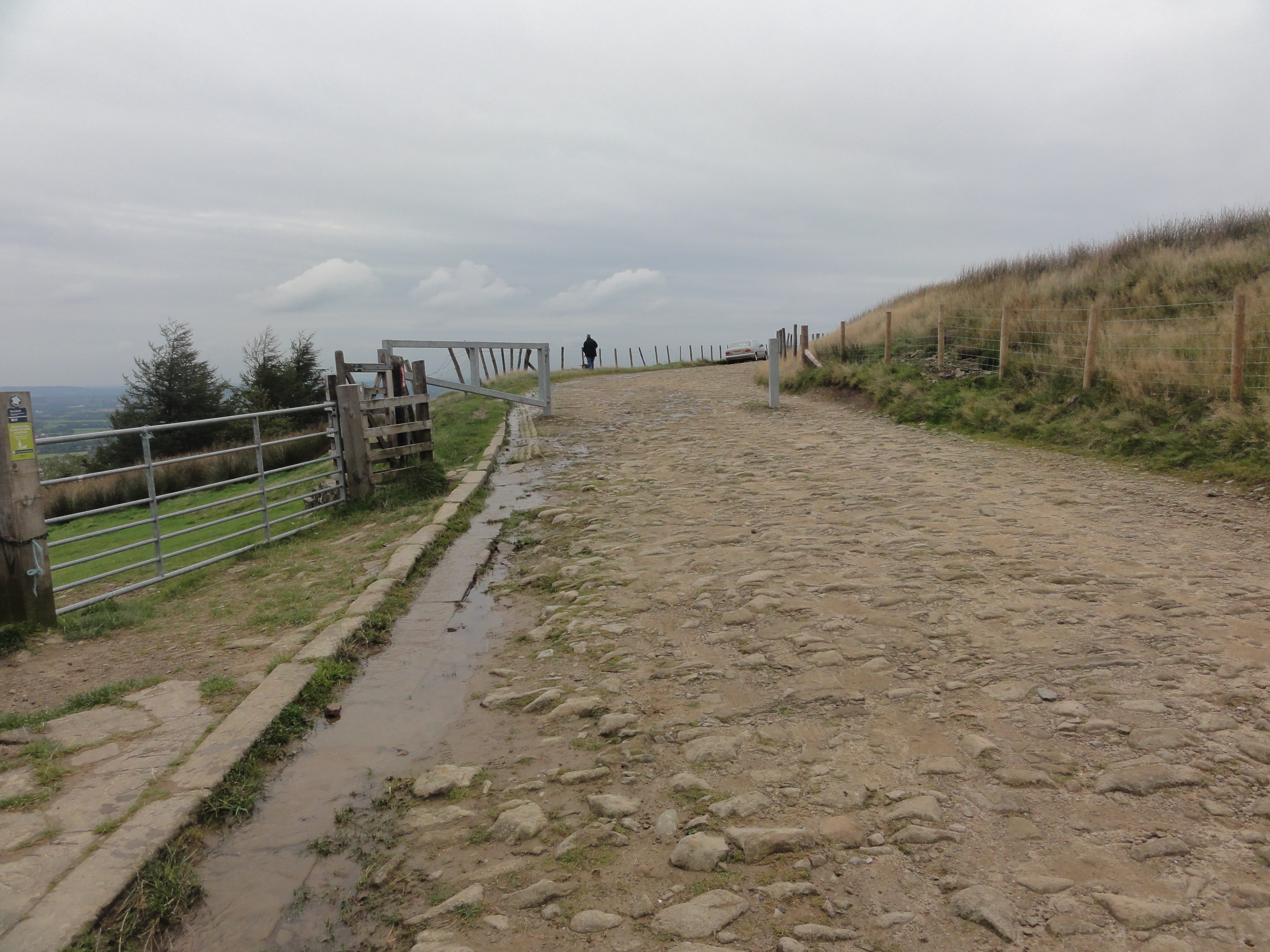
Belmont Road, Rivington (USRN 7400767)

Belmont Road (USRN 7400767) and Roynton Road (USRN 7400820) are the two roads that provide access to the hillside, the Terraced Gardens, the Pike and Winter Hill from the direction of Chorley, Belmont and Horwich. Both are open public roads recorded on the National Street Gazetteer which are public and under the control of the Lancashire County Council with adopted status and statutory protection by way of the Highways Act 1980. Gates placed on these roads must not be locked shut. The speed advice is a maximum of 5 mph. Belmont Road forks at the Pigeon Tower. The descending road has washed away. The continuation of the road to the right heads to Rivington Road and is now a dirt track across Rivington Moor. Roynton Road provides access across the lower part of the hillside and connects Rivington Lane to Sheep House Lane, via seven arch bridge.

The area is popular with walkers and many other road users including horse riders, mountain bikes, and motorcycles, and may be accessed by suitable cars. Footpaths and bridleways provide access to the hillside and surrounding moorland, protected by CROW, the Countryside and Rights of Way Act 2000.

Although land registry documents for the Pike hill do not record protection through the Liverpool Corporation Act 1902, it is an oversight, it was documented as part of the gift to the people of Bolton by Lord Leverhulme at the creation of Lever Park. The Pike, although a distance from the reservoirs and now owned by Chorley Council is part of Lever park and is mentioned as such in the Lever Park Act 1969 and has legally protected rights to free and uninterrupted public enjoyment in the Liverpool Corporation Act 1902. It is an area of open access land and has a right to roam. The Pike hill summit was included on the map presented by Lord Leverhulme to Bolton as part of the lands donated for the creation of Lever Park and as such there is a right to 'free and uninterrupted enjoyment'.

On the definitive map bridleway number 108 leads to the Pike Tower at the summit, passing Brown Hill accessible via bridleway 107 and 81 from Belmont Road. Bridleway 80 circles the base of the hill at the moorland side. There are other paths and bridleways in the area that are rights of way. The popular routes to the summit are via footpath 82, through the terraced gardens and via bridleway 98 past Higher Knoll farm. In the 1990s steps were built on the hillside to prevent deterioration.

== Nearby hill summits ==
| Name | Locality | Elevation | OS grid reference |
|---|---|---|---|
| Winter Hill ^{†} | Rivington | 1,496 feet (456 m) | SD659149 |
| Counting Hill | Smithills/Belmont | 1,421 feet (433 m) | SD671141 |
| Two Lads Hill ^{†} | Horwich | 1,276 feet (389 m) | SD655133 |
| Noon Hill ^{†} | Rivington | 1,247 feet (380 m) | SD647150 |
| Crooked Edge Hill | Horwich | 1,230 feet (375 m) | SD654134 |
| Rivington Pike | Rivington | 1,191 feet (363 m) | SD643138 |
| Adam Hill | Horwich | 1,181 feet (360 m) | SD660126 |
| White Brow | Horwich | 1,175 feet (358 m) | SD661124 |
| Whimberry Hill | Belmont | 1,115 feet (340 m) | SD686139 |
| Egg Hillock | Belmont | 1,076 feet (328 m) | SD684142 |
| Brown Hill | Rivington | 1,066 feet (325 m) | SD644135 |
| Brown Lowe | Smithills | 1,066 feet (325 m) | SD669130 |
| Burnt Edge | Horwich | 1,066 feet (325 m) | SD667125 |
† Denotes walker's cairn or similar.
