= Rivington Hall Barn =

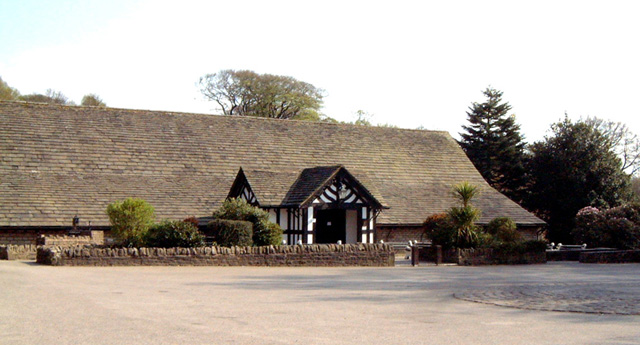
- Rivington Hall Barn

- Location within the Borough of Chorley

General information
- Type: Barn
- Location: Rivington, Lancashire, England
- Coordinates: 53.609°N 2.551°W
- Construction started: 16th century
- Renovated: 1905

Technical details
- Structural system: cruck frame

Website
- www.rivingtonhallbarn.co.uk

Listed Building – Grade II
- Designated: 22 October 1952
- Reference no.: 1072510

Rivington Hall Barn adjoins Rivington Hall in Rivington, Lancashire, near Chorley and Bolton. The Tithe barn foundation stones support a Medieval cruck construction and possibly date to the between the 9th and 15th centuries. The structure was restored, altered and enlarged in 1905 by Jonathan Simpson for Lord Leverhulme. It is a Grade II Listed building.

== Exterior ==
The barn has an oak cruck frame, the walls are clad in coursed sandstone and it has a stone slate roof. There is a long range of seven bays with aisles added in the 1905 restoration. The roof carried down over the aisles is of a flatter pitch than the original roof. In the west side is a T-plan timber-framed porch in the mock-Tudor style and in both gables a long flush mullion window at the ground floor level and similar mullion and transom window above.

== Interior ==
The barn has an interior length is 105 feet 8 inches and the width 57 feet 6 inches. It is divided by six forks or crucks into seven bays, the width of the centre avenue is 25 feet 7 inches and the forks are placed 15 to 16 feet apart. The timber is of English oak and the construction massive. The forks rest on large boulder stones above the floor line, and the height from floor to ridge line is 23 feet 10 inches." The original width was increased during restoration in 1905 and the timbers wholly exposed, and porches were added in the north and south sides. Hall Barn is popular with tourists visiting Rivington Country Park and serves refreshments and is a venue for celebrations.
