= Rivington and Blackrod High School =

Voluntary controlled comprehensive and sixth form school in England

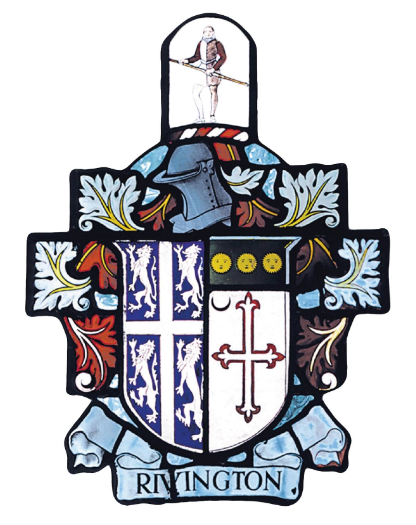

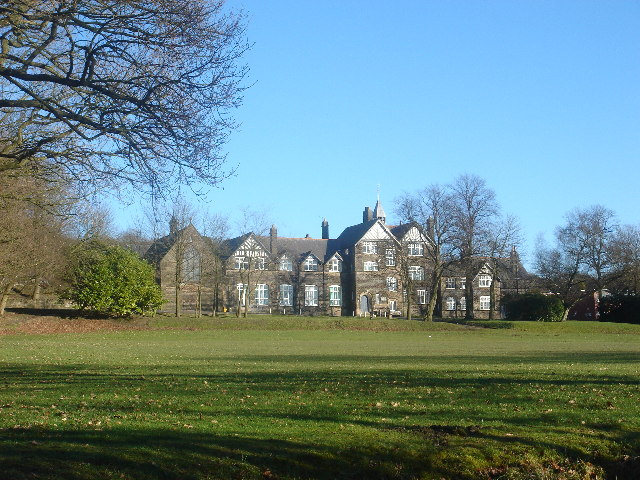

Location
- Upper school: Rivington Lane; Rivington; Lancashire; Lower school: Albert Street; Horwich; Greater Manchester; England; 53.610329°N 2.549176°W

Information
- Type: Academy
- Motto: "Once a Rivi, always a Rivi."
- Religious affiliation: Church of England
- Established: 1566; 460 years ago
- Founder: James Pilkington, Bishop of Durham
- Local authority: Bolton
- Trust: Leverhulme Academy Church of England and Community Trust
- Department for Education URN: 143773 Tables
- Ofsted: Reports
- Headteacher: Sam Walsh
- Gender: Coeducational
- Age: 11 to 18
- Enrolment: 1,683
- Colour: Burgundy
- Website: www.rbhs.co.uk

Rivington and Blackrod High School in the North West region of England is a Leverhulme Trust multi-academy comprehensive school. Alongside Harper Green School, it operates as a Church of England teaching environment with a sixth form school. The school is located at two sites, with the upper school situated on Rivington Lane in Rivington, Lancashire (SD637127), and the lower school situated on Albert Street in Horwich, Greater Manchester (SD638118).

== Present day ==
The school specialises in design and technology, mathematics and science. It has been awarded the status of a training school to train the next generation of teachers. Year Seven pupils (the lower school), occupy the former Horwich County Secondary School site Year Seven pupils also go to the Upper School Site every Friday. The upper school (high school) eight to eleven and Sixth form students occupy the Rivington site.

In 2008 the school was one of 11 across the country to receive a Specialist Schools and Academies Trust’s (SSAT) 2008 Futures Vision Tour Award and gave impressive A level results at 98%. The school ranked 7th in 2009 of 19 schools in the Bolton LEA with scores for GCSE % 50 Level 2 CVA 994.9 A/AS average points 611.1 and Level 3 CVA 990.7 in 2009.

== History ==
=== Rivington Grammar School ===
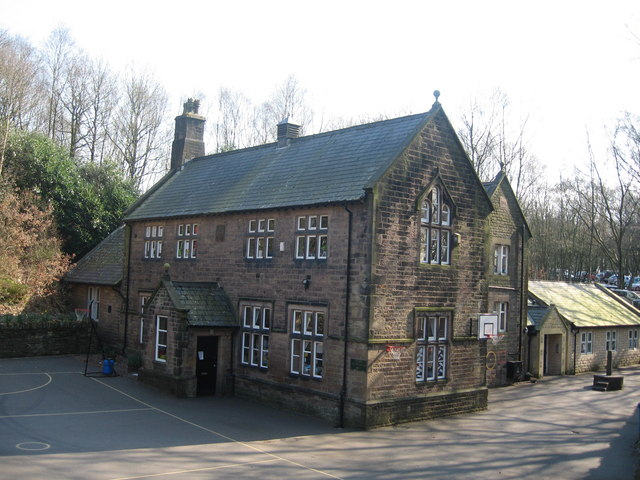
The old Rivington Grammar School

A free grammar school in Rivington village was founded by James Pilkington, Bishop of Durham in 1566 when a charter was granted by Queen Elizabeth I. The Free School of Queen Elizabeth was founded for the children of all social classes. The first schoolmaster was appointed on 10 July 1572. Arrangements to endow the school with an income were not completed until 1574. Bishop Pilkington confirmed the endowments. A list of its scholars, comprising 114 pupils, is dated 1575. Most of the school's endowments were provided by the bishop in the Diocese of Durham in Lindake, Wolsingham, Whickham, Heighington, Stanhope, Stockton, Auckland, Silksworth and Hetton-le-Hole and brought an income of £30 per year from rents. The school was built on land leased for a thousand years from March 1581 from the bishop's brother, George Pilkington of New Hall, then owner of the Manor of Rivington., he was also one of the first school governors. The governors of the old Grammar school appear to have begun their duties in August 1574.

The Chantry at the altar of St Nicholas at St Wilfred's Church, Standish had been endowed with Higher Knowle farm, Lower Knowle farm and Grut farm in 1478 by Robert Pilkington who was then its Chaplain. The farms were taken by the crown in consequence of the Abolition of Chantries Act 1547. In 1574 the school recovered rents for the same properties, whilst in 1583 by Thurston Anderton purchased the same farms from the Crown, the ownership would have been freehold and leasehold.

A governor of the school in 1650 until 1691 during the Commonwealth and after the Restoration was Thomas Willoughby, 11th Baron Willoughby of Parham, gentleman of Horwich. This Thomas Willoughby had also been the founder of a non conformist Chapel at Horwich, had taken over Horwich Parish Church for the benefit of dissenters and had fought with The Roundheads, he was a staunch puritan, achieving rank of Major.

Willoughby succeeded in regaining the schools rental income at a time when the school lacked funds between 1650 and 1660 travelling to London, York and Durham. He was chairman of governors in 1651, 1653–54, 1670, 1676 and 1683. He lived at a large estate near the high school inherited from his wife Eleanor Whittle on the Horwich side of the River Douglas, he lived to the age of 82, giving the area its name of Old Lords. He had been unexpectedly elevated to the legislature as an Hereditary Peer in 1685 after his relation had moved abroad. In the 18th century Richard Pilkington, whose sons founded Pilkington Glass, was a school governor for many years.

In 1714 the grammar school was rebuilt on its original site after many years of dilapidation. The governors obtained letters patent from George IV to exchange the land in Durham for land closer to the school in 1823. The Durham land was exchanged for Higher Knowles, Lower Knowles and Grut Farms in Rivington, and a house known as Jolly's in Heath Charnock which brought in annual rents. Higher Knowle farm is still active, Lower Knowle is a ruin, both located on the slope of Rivington Pike, Grut farm was once located opposite the entrance of the current Rivington and Blackrod High School driveway.

The original grammar school now houses the Rivington primary school.

=== Blackrod Grammar School ===
Blackrod Grammar School was founded by John Holmes, a London weaver, in whose will of 1568 rental income from property in London was left to trustees to pay a schoolmaster in Blackrod, and a further legacy of rental income paid for a scholar to attend Pembroke College, Cambridge. Henry Norris's legacy in 1639 was left in trust to pay a schoolmaster. It is not known where the school started, possibly in St Katharine's Church but premises were later provided near the church. In 1627 Elizabeth Tyldesley left rental income from land and property at Graveoak in Bedford to provide a free school in the county of Lancashire. Her trustees decided to benefit Blackrod in 1631. Income from the trust paid the schoolmaster from 1640. No scholars went to Pembroke College for many years before 1766 or up to 1790 and funds built up with interest. In 1790 agreements with Lord Lindsay of Haigh Hall brought in further income. By 1807 the trustees had accrued a significant sum to which in 1812 John Ainscough left a legacy including the income from mortgages on a toll road between Wigan to Preston. The old school, converted into a house was rented to Richard Bury after a new school was built in 1798. Accounts provided for the charity commissioners show the school was well funded in 1828.

=== Rivington and Blackrod Grammar School ===
Rivington and Blackrod Grammar Schools were amalgamated in 1875. Its charter was approved by Queen Victoria. In the Victorian era boarding was at cottages then known as School Houses in the village, today known as Mill Hill cottages. A new building for Rivington and Blackrod Grammar School was constructed on the current site in 1882 as a boarding school with provision for about fifty boarders and perhaps an equal number of day boys on land of the three Rivington farms connected to Rivington Grammar School's endowment. Its founding charter is displayed in the school.

=== Chapel ===
The school chapel was built in 1892 with a donation from Mr and Mrs Daniel Marshall, in memory of their son Frederick. The chapel was designed by R. K Freeman. It is panelled in Dantzic oak and has 100 sittings. The Anglican chapel had regular morning worship.

A stained glass east window was installed in 1912 commemorating James Pilkington, the Bishop of Durham and donors to the chapel. The side lights illustrate events in the career of the bishop, his Mastership of St John's College, Cambridge, fleeing to Europe, teaching children in Zurich, and revising the Book of Common Prayer with Matthew Parker, the Archbishop of Canterbury.

The west window, a memorial to those killed in the First World War, was unveiled on 8 March 1922 by R. T. Johnson, headmaster between 1894 and 1904 and dedicated by Henry Henn, the Bishop of Burnley. The window's three lights show, a laurel crowned figure representing victory, a knight in full armour, depicting faith and three Marys kneeling before the angel at the tomb of the risen Christ.

William Lever, founder of Lever Brothers was a school governor between 1901 and 1905 and made a contribution to the chapel windows installed in 1912.

The inscription in Latin translates to 'They Sought Glory of Liberty; they see the Glory of God'. The names of school's 24 war dead are also inscribed. Their surnames are given with initials of christian names on the window, their full names are given below, (Over 150 fought in the First World War)

- W. Leonard Billington
- Geoffrey R. Johnson
- Harold Briggs
- Henry Norman Johnson
- Frederick H. Brown
- Richard Miller
- Joseph O. Carter
- Norman Myers
- Ernest Cotton
- Richard Nelson
- Arthur Chippendale
- Harvey St George James Pulford
- John Entwistle
- J. Alec Ross
- Leonard W. Gastall
- Frank Savage
- John S. Griffiths
- Richard D. Scholfield
- Charles Grundy
- Harry Tatlow
- John Harvey
- Denham Walker
- Ralph Hough
- Percy Wilkinson

The name Arthur Chippendale appears on the stained glass, but Chippendale had survived the Great War. His story was featured in a BBC program titled "Rivington and Blackrod High School, Bolton: The Missing Man, The man who created a cover story to avoid the stigma of mental health", in 2015.

The east and west windows were produced by John Hardman and Company. Two windows were installed and designed for the chapel in 2004 by Andrew Seddon who also restored and cleaned the other windows. One was in memory of a former headmaster, Mr Jenner and the second to celebrate the centenary of the Association of Old Rivingtonians in the same year.

==== Roll of Honour ====
After the end of the Second World War, pupils placed a memorial book in the chapel bearing the names of those who lost their lives, this reads as follows:

Roll of Honour to those who laid down their lives in the war, 1939-1945

- Richard Cecil Butterworth
- Frederick Arthur Easthope
- John Lawrence Ellison
- Ted Atherton
- Tony Atherton
- Derek Booth
- John P. Dickinson
- Maurice Donkersley
- Eric Harper
- Fred James
- Ian Lamb
- Arthur Lee
- Norman Owen
- Edward Rawlinson
- Arthur Settle
- Fred Taylor
- Owen Worrall
- William Wallace Ryder
- Charles Philip Singleton

Wallasey Grammar School evacuated the entire school to Rivington and Blackrod Grammar in 1941, during World War II, a former pupil David Owen recalled 'Wallasey Grammar brought a new meaning to class war' and that the other school introduced them to Rugby Union, events are also recorded in media from Old Wallaseyans.

=== Mixed grammar school ===
After a decline in the numbers of scholars between 1904 and 1905, a meeting handed control of the school to the Local Authority under the powers of the Education Act 1902 giving it responsibility for secondary education. Under Sir Henry Flemming Hibbert, Chairman of the Lancashire Education Authority, the school became a day school. The new school was formally inaugurated by Lord Stanley and the new building opened by Frederick Stanley, 16th Earl of Derby. The assembly hall was inaugurated by Lord Stanley, in 1905, the year girls were first admitted. There were 200 places for equal numbers of boys and girls. Around this time the curriculum added modern studies.

=== Sport ===
The level pitch in front of the school was created between 1883 and 1884, at a cost of £210, the funds raised by a bazaar. The cricket pitch was laid and drained in 1907, by a bequest of £100 in memory of T. Heaton made by his grandson, William of Lostock. Rev. W. Ritson, Vicar of Rivington met much of the additional cost. Traditionally the school bell was not rung whilst a good game of cricket was being played. The grounds were in the past maintained by the scholars. The house system introduced in 1910 and teams are Holme, Queen’s and Pilkington.

=== Coat of arms ===
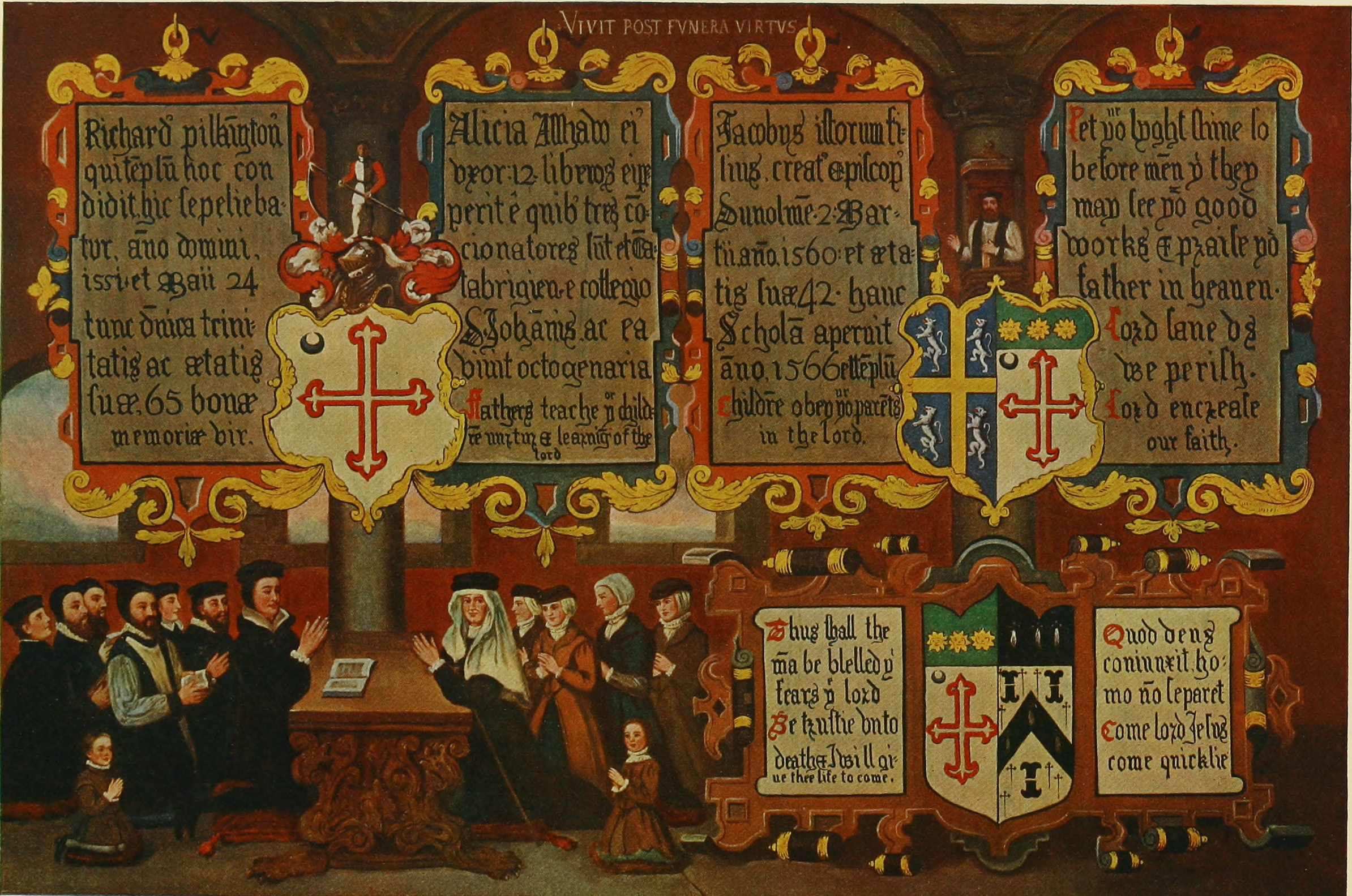
Pilkington painting

The Rivington and Blackrod High School badge worn on uniforms of pupils uniforms is an embroidered coat of arms of James Pilkington (bishop), a school founder, impaled with the arms of the see of Durham, the arms appear on the top right side of the Pilkington painting, now worn on the breast pocket, school tie and girls skirts in addition to P.E kit, where it also has initials of the schools name, 'R.B.H.S'

The arms of the Bishop were a "Argent a cross patonce Gules, voided by field, on a chief Vert three suns, or with the mark for a second son" awarded to the Bishop in 1561 by Sir Gilbert Dethicke Garter King of Arms. The see of Durham arms are "Azure a Cross Or between four Lions rampant Argent" and are derived from the seal of Robert Nevill, Bishop of Durham from 1438 to 1457.

The original school badge was a design of the coat of arms of the Pilkington family of Lancashire, an escutcheon with an argent cross patonce voided gules and were introduced for the school in 1907 by Rev. W. Ritson, Vicar of Rivington. The mower remains on the school coat of arms, but not on uniforms.

The school seal presented at its foundation, 1566, featured a depiction of the Bishop above the coat of arms of the school and was lost in 1882. The motto on the seal was in Latin and translated to 'who spares the rod spoils the child', the bishop is holding a birch rod in the right hand and bible in the left hand, open at the third chapter of the Epistle to the Galatians, religion being a key element in the early school with the birch and motto indicating use of corporal punishment in education.

=== Extension ===
In 1924 a school inspection showed a need to expand the building. Work started in April 1929 the extension foundation stone was laid 10 July 1929 by Alderman Ernest Ashton, Mayor of Chorley, who had been governor for many years. The extension was to accommodate 300 pupils and required a long corridor to be built between the buildings. The extension added new science rooms, general classrooms. A visitor in 1931 was the Earl of Derby, Edward George Villiers Stanley (1865–1948). Additional extensions were added in 1956 and further extensions added in 1958 when the headmaster's house was converted into classrooms.

=== Rivington and Blackrod High School ===
In 1973, Rivington and Blackrod High School was established by an amalgamation of Rivington and Blackrod Grammar School and Horwich County Secondary School. In 2004, the Brook Learning Partnership was formed - a collaborative partnership with Ladybridge High School, Bolton. The school became Leverhulme Academy Church of England and Community Trust along with Harper Green School in Farnworth in March 2017.
