= Rivington Hall =

Listed building in Lancashire, England

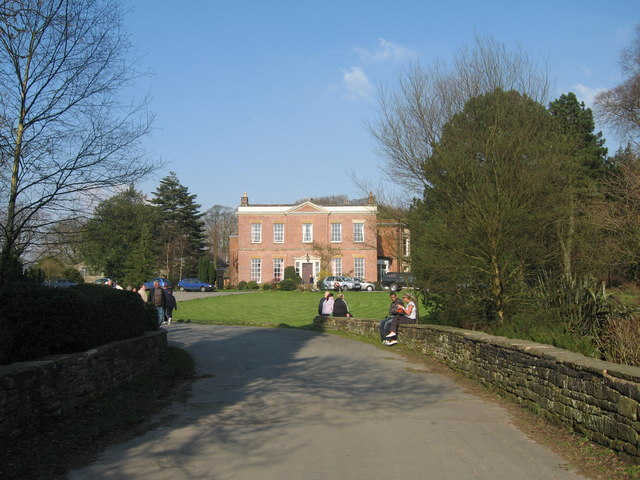
- Rivington Hall

- Location within the Borough of Chorley

General information
- Type: Manor house
- Architectural style: Georgian façade
- Location: Rivington, Lancashire, England
- Coordinates: 53.625°N 2.556°W (grid reference SD633144)

Technical details
- Material: Brick

Listed Building – Grade II*
- Official name: Rivington Hall
- Designated: 22 October 1952
- Reference no.: 1165012

Rivington Hall is a Grade II* listed building in Rivington, Lancashire, England. It was the manor house for the Lords of the Manor of Rivington. The hall is of various builds as successor to a 15th-century timber-framed courtyard house that was built near to the present building, of which no trace remains. It is a private residence.

== History ==
=== Pilkington ===
The Rector of Standish, Roger Standish in 1477 was the last surviving trustee of the estates of Alexander Pilkington of the Pilkington family of Lancashire, who had died in 1474 and held the family's land in Rivington and Mellor in trust, the original beneficiary being his son Ralph who also died the same year. The trust had been created in 1460 with trustees named as Thurstan Pilkington Chaplain and his brother Thomas, with Ralph his son appointed as his attorney to deliver seisin. He released the estates to the beneficiary, this being Robert Pilkington, Alexander's grandson, on his attaining the age of majority. Robert's ownership of lands in Mellor was challenged legally and physically by his uncle William De Aynesworth and his son, who carried out raids on properties on the estate and harassed the tenants and took numerous costly legal actions. They even abducted Robert and took him prisoner, at which time they tried to poison him.

Robert Pilkington settled at Rivington where he made immediate improvements to Rivington Hall, recorded in a deed of 1477 between him and Adam Holden to create a cross chamber and two great windows at the hall. The first hall was built of wood and plaster.

The chantry at the altar of St Nicholas at the Church of St Wilfrid, Standish was founded in 1478, and records of a memorial once located there indicate that Robert Pilkington had been custodian and chaplain of the chantry, giving it a yearly income of six marks. The chantry was ended in consequence of the Abolition of Chantries Act 1547.

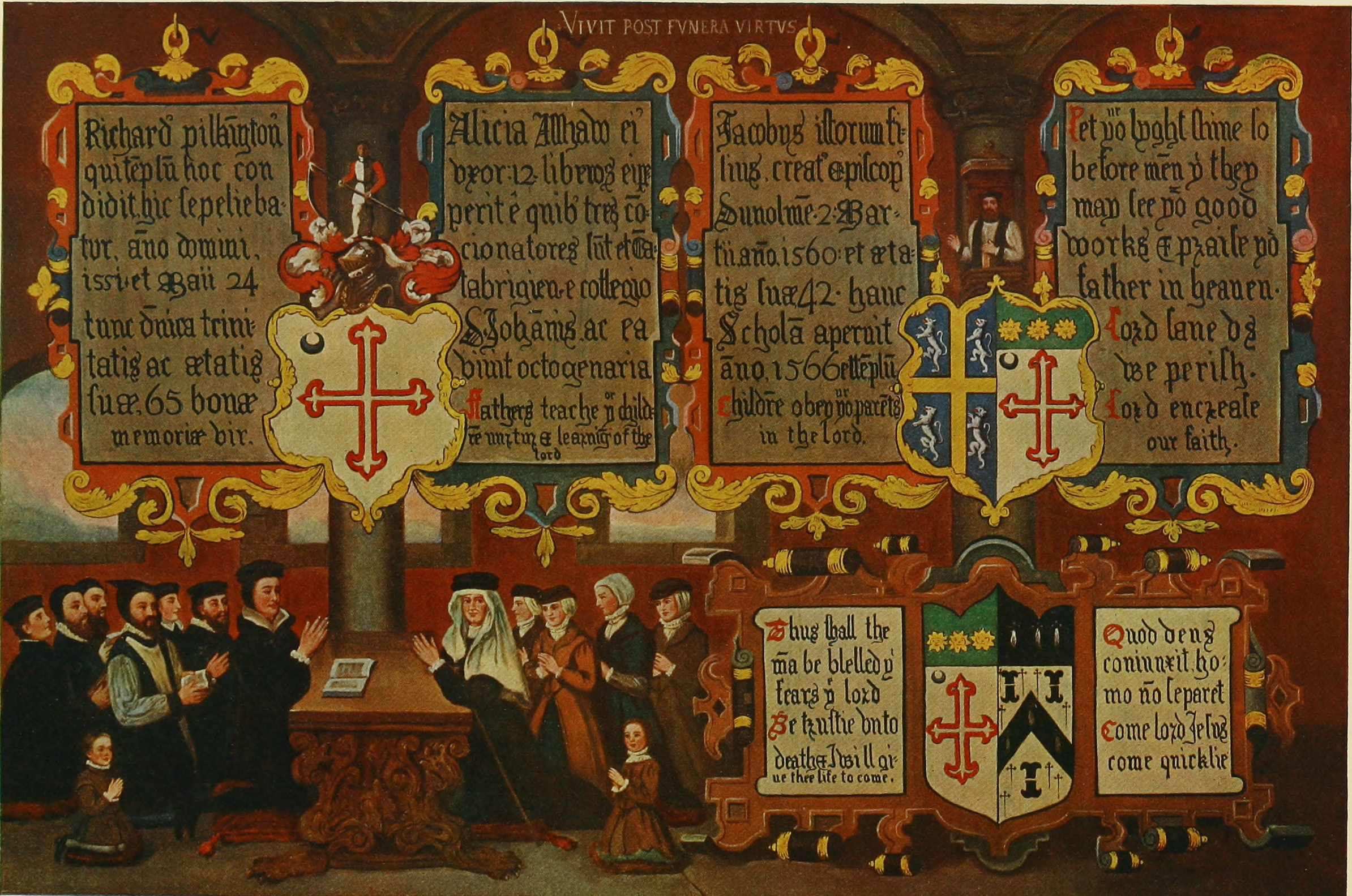
Pilkington painting

Robert's eldest son and heir Richard was born in 1488; he married Alice Asshawe, daughter of Lawrence Asshawe of Hall on the Hill, Heath Charnock in 1504 and inherited his father's estates on his death in 1508. Nationally the Reformation and Dissolution of the Monasteries led to significant changes in his time, with enclosures also taking place.

Richard and Alice had a large family, their two eldest sons were George born in 1516 and their second son was James Pilkington, the first Protestant Bishop of Durham, born in the old hall in 1518. A tale has passed down through generations that James' two sons, Joshua and Isaac, were kidnapped at the hall near the old saw pits in Hall Wood; both died young. Richard improved the local chapel, Rivington Church and in 1536 donated 3 acres (1.2 ha) of land for use of the priest. He died in 1551, as did his wife in 1565, and they are interred under the floor of the church. A copy of their memorial 'The Pilkington painting' is on display there.

The eldest son George married Anne daughter of Geoffrey Sharkerly of Chester in 1544, as a wedding gift Richard his father gave the couple New Hall and lands belonging to it. A year after his father's death, on inheriting the hall in 1552 he passed New Hall to his mother Alice for her lifetime. George's eldest son Robert was born in 1560.

George was appointed by letters patent in 1566 as one of the first governors of 'The Free School of Queen Elizabeth in Rivington'. He donated land in 1587; the school had been founded by his brother the Bishop of Durham, James. George died in 1597, the hall then passed to his son Robert, who had married the same year.

The problem of the land enclosure had resulted in sixteen cases before the courts during the lifetime of George, and more cases continued during the time of ownership by Robert. Robert inherited the hall on the death of his father George in 1597. Robert had been Feodary of Lancashire and farmer of the Queen's mills at Earl Shilton, Leicester from 1592 until his death. He had a legal practice in London where he stayed until 1596; he had served as MP for Clitheroe in 1589. He moved to Gray's Inn in 1585.

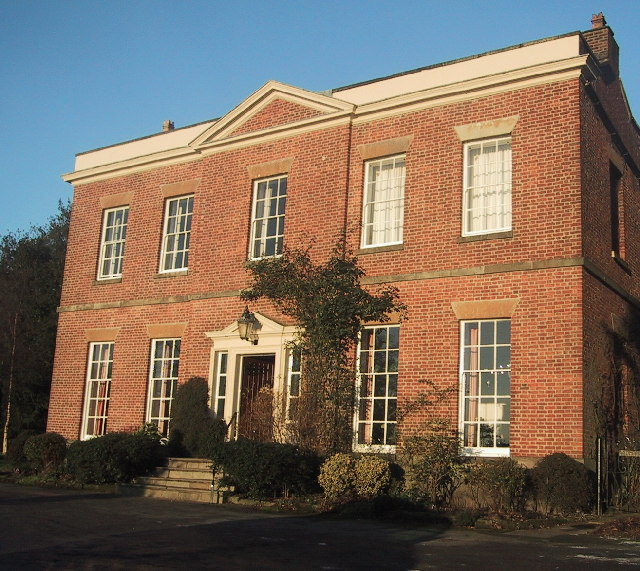
Rivington Hall

After the death of Robert his estate was left with debts, and to pay them the hall was sold to relatives Robert Lever and Thomas Breres in 1611. The Breres became resident at the hall, whilst New Hall and its land was retained.

=== Andrews / Crompton ===
In 1729 John Andrews bought the Breres' share of the estate. Robert Andrews rebuilt the hall in 1774. After Andrews' death the property passed to his sister Hannah Maria Andrews who had married Robert Fletcher of Liverpool. Their daughter, Lucy, married Woodhouse Crompton in 1834. The Tithe Tax in 1850 gives detail of the extent of Rivington Hall in the mid-Victorian era, being 32 acres (13 ha).

=== 20th century to present ===
The Cromptons remained at the hall by agreement until 1910, when they sold the estate to William Lever, 1st Viscount Leverhulme. Leverhulme sold the hall, Hall Barn and land to Liverpool Corporation in 1902.

Rivington Hall and Hall Barn were used as bases for troops and the Ministry of Food during World War II. The buildings had been left derelict until the intervention of William Salmon, who reinvested the profits from his business there to pay for the work of restoring the Barn Tea Rooms and the hall, which by 1953 was considered for demolition. Salmon Catering has held a lease for the property since then. The hall is today a private residence.

The hall is under land registry title number LAN62356; the freehold is held by United Utilities and a lease is held by Salmon Catering. The hall and adjacent barn tea room is not subject to the Liverpool Corporation Act 1902.

== Architecture ==
The 15th-century wood and wattle and daub structure was demolished and the hall rebuilt in stone and extended from the end of the 17th century. The oldest part of the hall is dated "1694 WB" (William Breres) over a rear door on the west side. The date "1700" and "WBM" (William Breres and Martha) is on the north wing. The oldest parts of the hall are to the rear where the ground floor is built of sandstone rubble with quoins, whilst the upper storey is built of coursed squared sandstone, indicating a later date. The oldest parts contain mullion windows. The stables to the east of the house were dated "1713 WBMI" (William and Martha Breres and John) and "1732 IAA" (John Andrews and Abigail). The date stones are now in the chapel yard of Rivington Unitarian Chapel. The hall's west front is a symmetrical red brick, two-storey structure built in the classical Georgian style with five bays and a pedimented centre, with a stone parapet hiding the roof, which has a chimney in each gable. The central doorway, approached by a flight of four stone steps, is flanked by side lights and has a pediment. At ground-floor level there are four tall, 15-pane sash windows, and on the floor above five shorter 12-pane sashes with splayed heads. The spout heads bear the date "1774 RA" (Robert Andrews). The south wing was built in brick in the 17th century and was mostly demolished and rebuilt by Robert Andrews in 1774, incorporating some of the older stone building, with a red-brick Georgian frontage.

== See also ==
- Grade II* listed buildings in Lancashire
- Listed buildings in Rivington
