= Thomas Hampson (author) =

English author and local historian

- Born: 1839; Horwich, Lancashire, England
- Died: 25 November 1918 (aged 79); Bolton, Lancashire, England
- Notable work: History of Blackrod; Horwich: Its History, Legends, and Church; History of Rivington

Thomas Hampson (1839 – 25 November 1918) was an English author and local historian.

== Life ==
He was born in Horwich in 1839, the youngest child of Henry and Mary Hampson. He was baptised at Holy Trinity Church, Horwich on 10 November 1839. His father died in May 1842, leaving his mother to bring up the children on her own. He started work at Wallsuches bleach works in Horwich when he was seven-years-old. He married Sarah Jane Aldred at Holy Trinity Church, Horwich on 2 April 1866. They had three sons: John Henry, John Fox, and Benjamin, and three daughters: Clara, Mary Ann, and Eleanor. After his marriage, he continued to be employed at the bleach works as a finisher, but between 1877 and 1881 he lost a number of fingers on his left hand in a works accident which seems to have forced him into a clerical career. He was a secretary at the short-lived Red Moss Ironworks, Horwich. Then employed as a cashier, first at Scot Lane Colliery, Blackrod, then at Fourgates Colliery, Wingates, Westhoughton.

It was around this period of his life he wrote a number of notable local history books. He published History of Blackrod in 1882, Horwich: Its History, Legends, and Church in 1883, and History of Rivington in 1893.^{[N1]}

After Horwich Works were built by the Lancashire and Yorkshire Railway (L&YR) in 1886, he was employed as a labourer in the iron foundry, then as a locomotive stores keeper.

His wife, Sarah Jane, died in April 1907, aged 64, and eleven years later Thomas died at Bolton Royal Infirmary on 25 November 1918, aged 79. They are both buried in Holy Trinity Churchyard, Horwich.

== Notes ==
- ^{N1} Due to a deception by another author's publisher the History of Rivington has a caveat. Hampson quoted from The Diary of Lady Willoughby by Hannah Mary Rathbone at pages 75 to 95 and summarises based on the diary at pages 96 to 97, the diary forms the basis of chapters 16 to 19 and the source is named at page 199. The Diary of Lady Willoughby was published in 1844 by a publisher who passed it off as a genuine transcript, it was revealed as fiction in the third edition of 1873 when the publishers and author inserted a joint note avowing the real character of the book reading ‘To The Reader, The style and printing and general appearance of this volume have been adopted by the publishers in accordance with the design of the Author, who in this work 'personates' (sic) a lady of the seventeenth century.’

== Bibliography ==
- Hampson, Thomas (1882). History of Blackrod. Wigan: "Observer" Office.
- Hampson, Thomas (1883). Horwich: Its History, Legends, and Church. Wigan: "Observer" Office.
- Hampson, Thomas (1893). History of Rivington. Wigan: "Observer" Office.
- Rathbone, Hannah Mary (1844). The Diary of Lady Willoughby (1st ed.). London: Longman, Brown, Green, & Longmans.
- Rathbone, Hannah Mary (1873). The Diary of Lady Willoughby (3rd ed.). London: Longmans, Green, Reader, and Dyer.
- Smith, M.D. (1988). About Horwich. Chorley: Nelson Brothers Printers Limited. ISBN 0-9508772-7-1.
- Sutherland, John (1990). The Stanford Companion to Victorian Fiction. Stanford, California: Stanford University Press. ISBN 0804718423.
