= Listed buildings in Horwich =

Horwich is a civil parish in the Metropolitan Borough of Bolton, Greater Manchester, England. It contains 19 listed buildings that are recorded in the National Heritage List for England. All the listed buildings are designated at Grade II, the lowest of the three grades, which is applied to "buildings of national importance and special interest". The parish contains the town of Horwich and the surrounding countryside. It has an industrial heritage, including a bleach works and a locomotive factory. The listed buildings include buildings surviving from the bleach works, a war memorial associated with the locomotive factory, houses and farmhouses, churches, a public house, a parish hall, a school, and a set of stocks.

== Buildings ==
Name and location	Photograph	Date	Notes
Blundell Arms public house 53.59526°N 2.50612°W		17th century	The public house was extended in the 19th century. It is in stone with quoins and a stone-slate roof. There are two storeys, five bays, and lean-to extensions at the rear. The left bay projects, it is taller, and is canted, and contains casement windows and a round-headed cellar entrance. The second and third bays contain mullioned windows and steps leading up to a central porch. The other two bays are recessed and lower, and contain a mullioned window and blocked windows.
Lower House Farmhouse; 53.58826°N 2.54011°W		17th century	The former farmhouse is in stone with quoins and a slate roof. There are two storeys and four bays, the right bay being higher, and at the rear is an outshut. In the first three bays the windows on the ground floor are mullioned, and on the upper floor they are casements. The right bay has a casement window on the ground floor and a small-paned window above. Above the entrance is a lintel and a hood mould. In the right return are external steps leading to a doorway on the upper floor.
Marklands House; 53.60544°N 2.52812°W		17th century	The house was extended in 1746. It is in stone with quoins and a slate roof. There are two storeys and three bays, the third bay forms the extension and is canted forward. The windows vary; some are mullioned, some are casements, and some are small-paned. Above the entrance is an inscribed lintel.
Walker Fold; 53.60583°N 2.48990°W	—	17th century	Two stone houses with quoins and a slate roof. There are two storeys and five bays. The windows on the upper floor are casements, and on the ground floor most are mullioned, with a casement window in the fifth bay.
Bolton Fold Farmhouse and Cottage; 53.59380°N 2.51848°W	—	Late 17th century	Two houses in stone with quoins and a slate roof. There are two storeys, two bays, and a projecting right wing. The windows in the first bay are 20th-century casements, and the others are mullioned. Above the entrance is a large lintel.
Wilderswood Manor House; 53.60700°N 2.53672°W		1722	A stone house with quoins and a slate roof. There are two storeys, four bays and an outshut at the rear. The windows are mullioned, there is a datestone above the entrance on the front, and a porch on the left return.
Building approximately 30 metres northeast of Wallsuches House; 53.60181°N 2.52609°W	—	Late 18th century	This originated as a factory building in a bleach works. It is in stone and brick with a top frieze and cornice, and has a hipped slate roof. There are two storeys and five bays, the second and fourth bays projecting forward. The windows are sash windows, and one is blind. In the second and fourth bays are round-headed entrances with imposts and keystones, the left one blocked, and the right containing a door with a fanlight. (Note: Street View in October 2009 shows that the building has been converted for domestic use (Arcon Village).)
Building approximately 40 metres northeast of Wallsuches House; 53.60189°N 2.52577°W		Late 18th century	This originated as a factory building in a bleach works, and is in stone with quoins and a slate roof. There are two storeys and seven bays, the right two bays projecting forward and gabled. The windows are casements, and there are round-headed arches containing doorways in the second bay and in the protruding bays. On the roof is a gabled dormer containing an octagonal clock face. (Note: Street View in October 2009 shows that the building has been converted for domestic use (Arcon Village).)
Building approximately 60 metres east of Wallsuches House; 53.60150°N 2.52512°W		Late 18th century	This originated as a factory building in a bleach works, and is in stone with a hipped slate roof and two storeys. The west front has three bays, a sill band, and a rusticated ground floor. On the ground floor is a round-headed window with imposts and a keystone, and on the upper floor are two round-headed windows with keystones. The longer north and south fronts have irregular bays and small windows. (Note: Street View in October 2009 shows that the building has been converted for domestic use (Arcon Village).)
Wallsuches Bleach Works; 53.60111°N 2.52463°W		Late 18th century	The factory buildings at Wallsuches were constructed in phases up to the late 19th century, and have since been used for other purposes. They are in gritstone and brick, with quoins and roofs of stone and slate, and are of varying types and sizes. (Note: Street View in October 2009 shows that the buildings have been converted for domestic use (Arcon Village).)
Horwich Parish Hall; 53.59907°N 2.53752°W		1793	Originally a school, the hall is in stone with quoins and a slate roof. There are two storeys and three bays. In the central bay is a gabled porch with a Tudor arched entrance and a hood mould, above which is a plaque and a Diocletian window. The outer bays have Venetian windows on the ground floor, casement windows on the upper floor, and gables with bargeboards.
Ridgmont House; 53.59723°N 2.52698°W		c. 1800	A country house, later used as a Masonic hall, it is stuccoed with stone dressings, a sill band, a top cornice, and a stone-slate hipped roof. There are two storeys and eight bays, the middle three bays projecting under a pediment containing a round recess. On the front is a semicircular porch with two Doric columns and half-columns, and the windows are sashes. At the rear is a three-bay bow window.
54–70 and 70A Church Street; 53.59872°N 2.54011°W	—	Early 19th century	A terrace of nine stone houses with a slate roof, most with two storeys, some with basements, and a total of eleven bays. No. 54 has three storeys and three bays. On the ground floor are bow windows with small-paned glazing and entablatures, and on the upper floor most of the windows are casements. The doorways are approached by steps, and have flat pilasters and entablatures.
Wallsuches House; 53.60147°N 2.52670°W	—	Early 19th century	A stone house with bands, a top cornice, a blocking course, and a slate roof. There are two storeys, five bays, and a rear extension. The central bay projects forward, it is bowed, and has a top cornice on consoles. The bay contains a bowed tetrastyle Doric porch and a doorway with a fanlight. Most of the windows are sashes; some have been converted into casements.
Holy Trinity Church; 53.59921°N 2.53865°W		1830–31	A Commissioners' church designed by Francis Bedford, to which a chancel was added in 1903 by R. Knill Freeman. The church is in stone with a slate roof, and consists of a nave with west porches flanking a tower, and a chancel with a south organ loft. The tower has angle buttresses rising to octagonal turrets, an entrance with a four-centred arch, a clock face on all sides, and an embattled parapet with open tracery. Along the sides of the church are buttresses, a cornice, parapet, and crocketed pinnacles.
Horwich Primary School; 53.59898°N 2.53973°W		1832	The school is in stone with a band, and a slate roof with coped gables. There are two storeys and seven bays. The windows have two segmental-headed lights and hood moulds, and above the two doorways are similar fanlights.
St Catherine's Church; 53.59773°N 2.55229°W		1897	The oldest part of the church is the nave by R. Knill Freeman, and the former chancel was replaced in 1932. The church is in Perpendicular style and is built in red brick with dressings in stone and terracotta, and has slate roofs with coped gables and finials. It consists of a nave and a chancel in one vessel, a clerestory, north and south aisles, a north chapel, a south transept, a south vestry, and a southwest porch. On the transept is a bellcote, and the porch has a stepped embattled parapet.
War memorial 53.59532°N 2.54707°W		1921	The war memorial is at the entrance to the former Horwich Locomotive Works. It consists of a marble statue of a soldier with a rifle standing on a granite pedestal. This is on a granite plinth on a chamfered concrete base. On the pedestal are inscriptions, including the names of those lost in the two world wars. The memorial is enclosed by iron railings.
Stocks; 53.59879°N 2.53556°W		Uncertain	The stocks are outside the vicarage, and consist of two stone posts with vertical grooves on the inner faces. The stocks have been converted into an ornamental bench.

== Notes and references ==
=== Sources ===
- Historic England, "Blundell Arms public house, Horwich (1067323)", National Heritage List for England
- Historic England, "Lower House Farmhouse, Horwich (1309783)", National Heritage List for England
- Historic England, "Marklands House, Horwich (1067328)", National Heritage List for England
- Historic England, "Walker Fold, Horwich (1356782)", National Heritage List for England
- Historic England, "Bolton Fold Farmhouse and Cottage, Horwich (1067329)", National Heritage List for England
- Historic England, "Wilderswood Manor House, Horwich (1067322)", National Heritage List for England
- Historic England, "Walsuches Bleach Works, Horwich (1267985)", National Heritage List for England
- Historic England, "Building at Arcon Engineering approximately 30 metres north-east of Walsuches House, Horwich (1067324)", National Heritage List for England
- Historic England, "Building at Arcon Engineering approximately 40 metres north-east of Walsuches House, Horwich (1162171)", National Heritage List for England
- Historic England, "Building at Arcon Engineering approximately 60 metres east of Walsuches House, Horwich (1309760)", National Heritage List for England
- Historic England, "Horwich Parish Hall, former Horwich School, Horwich (1162206)", National Heritage List for England
- Historic England, "Ridgemont House Masonic Hall, Horwich (1067325)", National Heritage List for England
- Historic England, "Nos. 54 to 70 and 70A Church Street, Horwich (1162243)", National Heritage List for England
- Historic England, "Walsuches House, Horwich (1162261)", National Heritage List for England
- Historic England, "Church of Holy Trinity, Horwich (1067326)", National Heritage List for England
- Historic England, "Horwich Parish Church of England Primary School, Horwich (1309736)", National Heritage List for England
- Historic England, "Church of St Catherine, Horwich (1350355)", National Heritage List for England
- Historic England, "War Memorial at former Horwich Locomotive Works, Horwich (1396590)", National Heritage List for England
- Historic England, "Stocks outside vicarage near junction of Stocks Park Drive, Horwich (1067327)", National Heritage List for England
- Historic England, Listed Buildings
- Hartwell, Clare; Hyde, Matthew; Pevsner, Nikolaus (2004), Lancashire: Manchester and the South-East, The Buildings of England, New Haven and London: Yale University Press, ISBN 0-300-10583-5
