= Tumbledown Dick =

Tumbledown Dick may refer to:

- Richard Cromwell, who earned "Tumbledown Dick" as a nickname after abruptly falling from power
- The Tumbledown Dick, a former pub in Farnborough, Hampshire, England
- Tumbledown Dick, a 1736 play by Henry Fielding
- Tumbledown Dick, a book by Howard Spring
