= St Catherine's Church, Horwich =

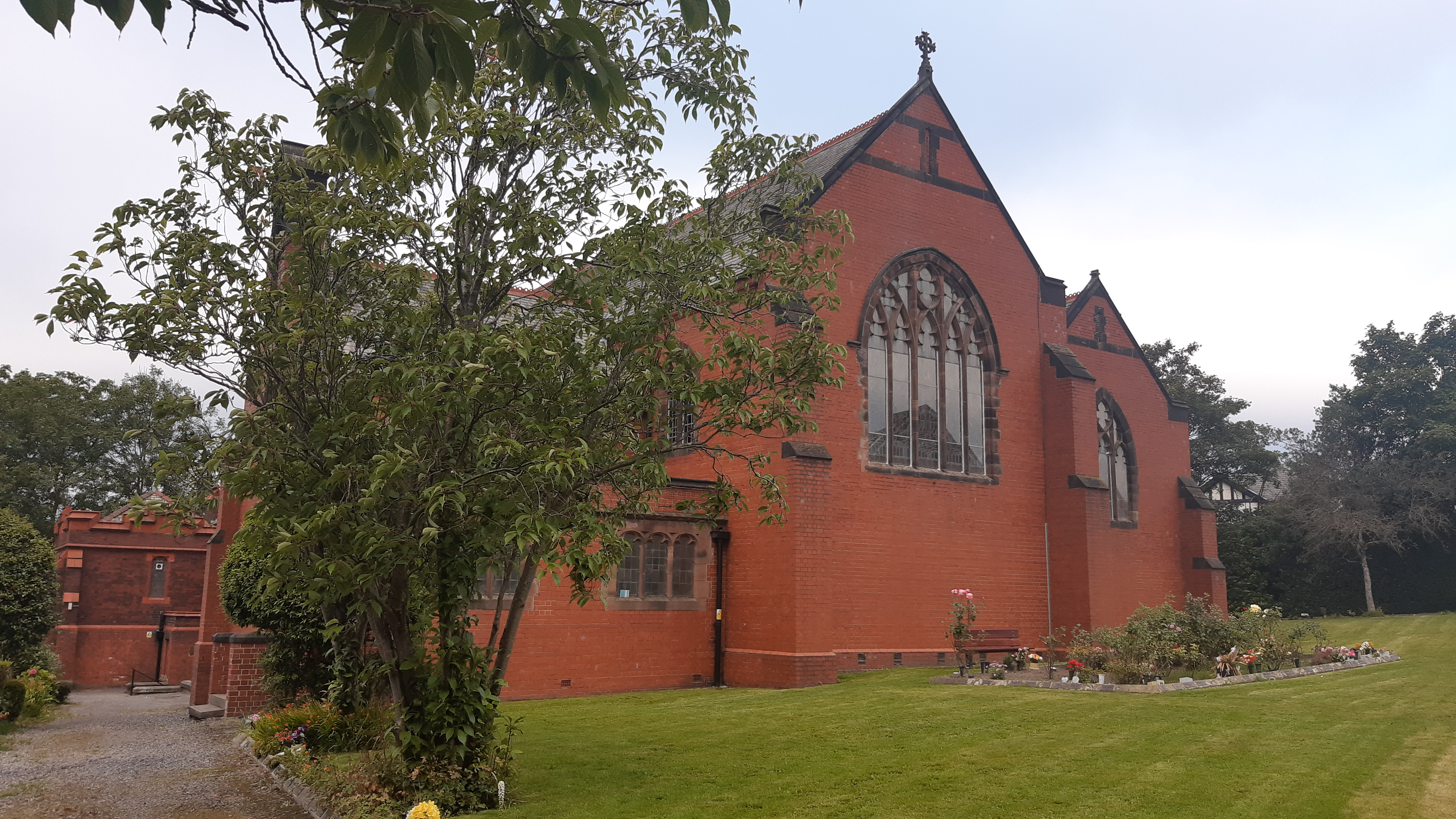
- St Catherine's Church
- St Catherine's Church, Horwich
- 53.59773°N 2.55229°W
- OS grid reference: SD 63541 11381
- Location: Horwich, Greater Manchester
- Address: Richmond Street
- Country: England
- Denomination: Church of England
- Website: St Catherine's Church, Horwich at achurchnearyou.com

History
- Status: Parish Church
- Founded: 1897

Architecture
- Functional status: Active Parish Church
- Heritage designation: Grade II listed building
- Designated: 9 May 2003
- Architect: R. Knill Freeman
- Style: Perpendicular Style
- Years built: 1897–1932

Administration
- Province: York
- Diocese: Manchester
- Archdeaconry: Bolton
- Deanery: Bolton
- Benefice: Horwich and Rivington

St Catherine's Church is a Grade II listed building in Richmond Street, Horwich, Greater Manchester, England. It is an active Church of England parish church in the Deanery of Bolton, the Archdeaconry of Bolton, and the Diocese of Manchester. St Catherine's Church is one of four churches which form the united Benefice of Horwich and Rivington; the other three are Holy Trinity Church and St Elizabeth's Church in Horwich, and Rivington Parish Church.

== History ==
The foundation stone of the church was laid by the Earl of Lathom on 2 October 1897. The nave was built in 1902, but the chancel remained unfinished until 1932. The church is recorded in the National Heritage List for England as a designated Grade II listed building on 9 May 2003.

== Structure ==
The oldest part of the church is the nave by R. Knill Freeman, and the former chancel was replaced in 1932. The church is in Perpendicular style and is built in red brick with dressings in stone and terracotta, and has slate roofs with coped gables and finials. It consists of a nave and a chancel in one vessel, a clerestory, north and south aisles, a north chapel, a south transept, a south vestry, and a southwest porch. On the transept is a bellcote, and the porch has a stepped embattled parapet.

== See also ==
- List of churches in Greater Manchester
- Listed buildings in Horwich
