= The Tumbledown Dick =

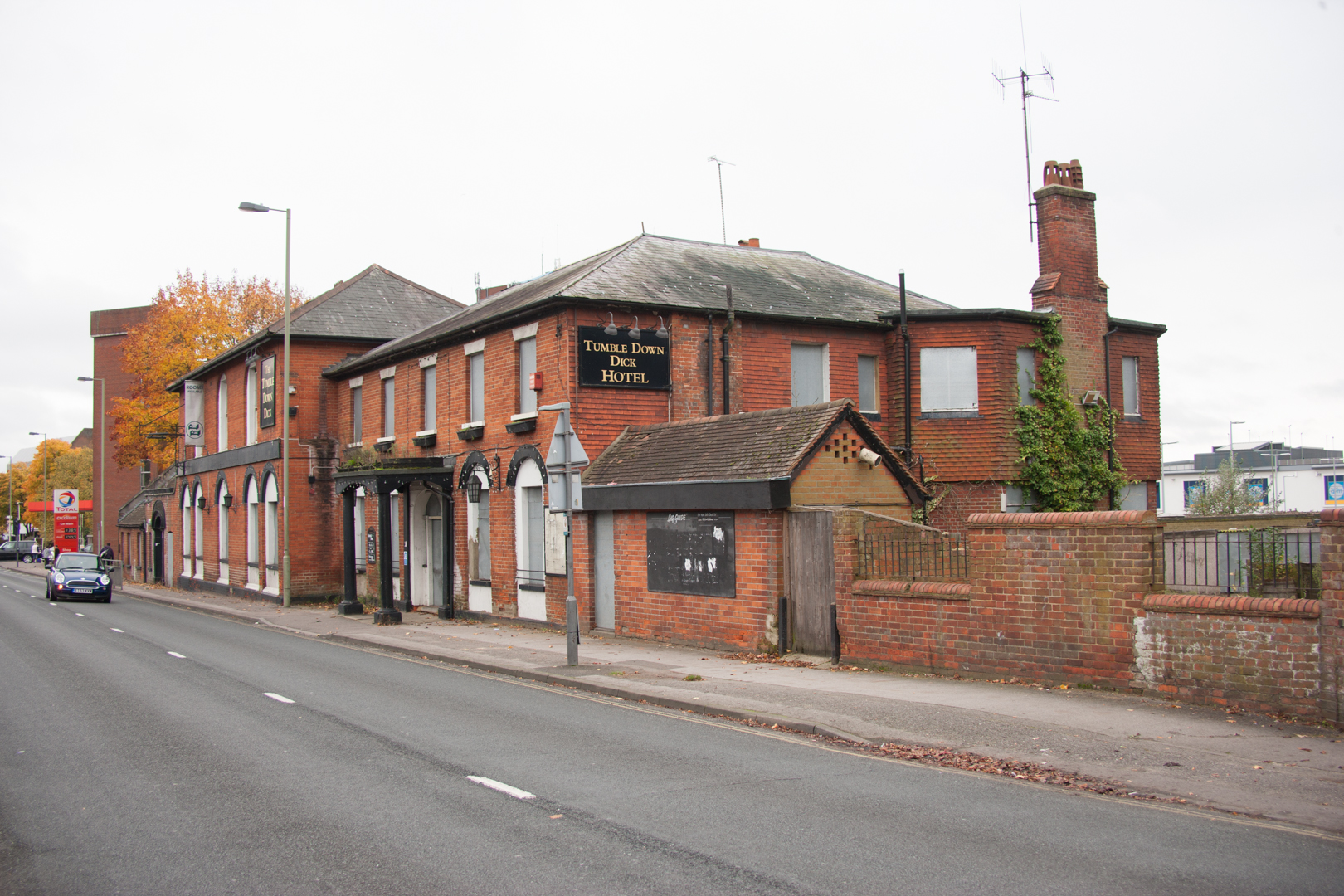
- The Tumbledown Dick in 2012

- Location within Hampshire
- 51°17′35″N 0°45′12″W
- Type: Former public house
- Location: Farnborough

History
- Built: 1674

Site notes
- Area: Hampshire
- Owner: McDonald's

The Tumbledown Dick was a former public house in Farnborough, Hampshire, England, that operated from the 16th century until the early 21st century. The name of the pub originated as the satirical nickname given to Richard Cromwell, son of Oliver Cromwell, after his abrupt fall from power after a brief nine-month reign in 1658–59. The pub was the central focus of Farnborough before its 19th-century refocus toward North Camp and the current town centre's 20th-century development. Local folklore links the pub with various historical figures, including Cromwell, Henry VII (celebrating the downfall of Richard III) and Dick Turpin. The pub was closed in 2008, and the building was purchased by McDonald's in 2012.

== History ==
A pub on the site is believed to have been built prior to 1700, with an original building having been constructed in 1674. It was used in the billeting of troops in transit from no later than 1696, continuing until at least 1756, five beds and stabling for five horses, and was the start of the continued relationship between the Army and the pub.

The Posting House Tumbledown Dick, a watercolour of the pub painted in 1782 by Thomas Rowlandson.

It was during the 18th century that the pub was first used as a post house, and it was described at the time as a hub of the community. By the 19th century, the building had become a "Posting Inn", with stagecoaches and road wagons stopping there on their way between Southampton and London, and was also the location of a fish market for Farnborough and the neighbourhood. The pub sign showed a man in top-boots, with pipe and glass, falling under a table; after the Crimean War, this was changed at the request of the Army into a falling Hussar.

Important land and property sales were both advertised and held at the pub, including the sale of Farnborough Place and Park and the pub itself in 1861. As late as 1862 the pub was being used as the location for the manorial courts of the Manor of Farnborough, the Courts Baron and Customary Courts, wherein rents were paid and Coroner's inquests held.

The middle of the century saw the building as a place for local people and visitors to celebrate and be entertained, ranging from post-match meals for cricket teams to grand celebrations for royal events. Court Alexandra, number 4151 of The Ancient Order of Foresters, was formed in 1863 and held Courts at the Tumbledown Dick from 1871 to 1906, numbering some 297 local people.

In the late 20th century the pub with a large addition on the south side operated as a live music venue and was a focal place in Farnborough. A number of bands played there early in their musical careers, or performed there while on tour. Notable bands to perform at the venue include Mega City Four, Reuben, Hundred Reasons, and Paul Weller and The Jam.

In September 2007, Punch Taverns, the pub's owners, closed it on health and safety grounds, with a view to a major refurbishment being undertaken. They did not re-open the pub.

== Conversion ==
In August 2012 the freehold owners of the building, Bride Hall Investments, made an agreement to sell it to the McDonald's restaurant chain. The following October, a community group was formed as The Friends of the Tumbledown Dick with the goal of raising local awareness, mounting a legal challenge to the demolition of the pub, and eventually purchasing the property to re-open it as a community run pub. In February 2014, a petition to save the pub had attracted over 3000 signatures. The campaign did not succeed, ultimately failing to attract sufficient funding or interest.

Although planning regulations at the time meant that use of a public house as a restaurant did not require permission, in 2013 a planning application to adapt the building for use as a restaurant/takeaway, involving partial demolition and addition of new structural elements was successful. This followed an earlier version of the plans in which the building was to be demolished entirely. The proposal was amended to retain the facade and other parts of the existing structure partly through the intervention of local MP Gerald Howarth who met with McDonalds. The building later re-opened, refurbished as a restaurant and drive-through. During refurbishment, removal of external tiling revealed an early 20th century 'Simonds' of Reading brewery sign on the north wall which was retained and repainted.

== Heritage status ==
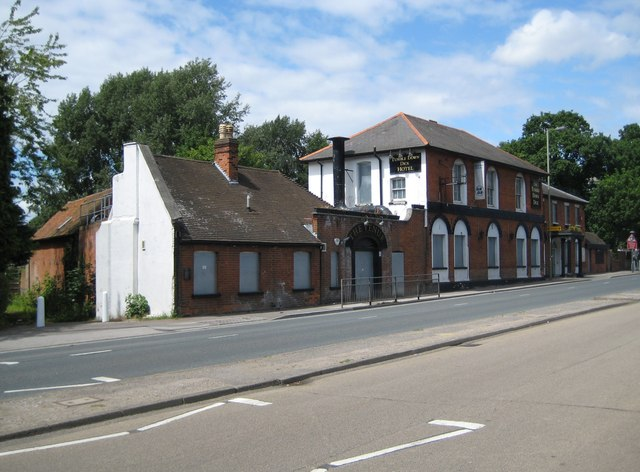

The building was listed in the 1980s as a "Hampshire treasure" by Hampshire County Council. In December 2012, Rushmoor Borough Council published a report assessing the building against the criteria used by English Heritage when considering if a building is worthy of listed building status, but concluded against its listing. The following month, English Heritage declined an application for the building to receive listed building status, stating that it lacked the special architectural and historical interest required to qualify. A group of supporters of the pub called the "Friends of the Tumbledown Dick" subsequently commissioned and published its own heritage report into the historical value of the pub. It alleged the report commissioned by the Council from an independent consultant was "fundamentally flawed". Following applications by the group to Rushmoor Borough Council, in 2013 the building was both designated as locally listed as an Asset of Community Value and a "Building of Local Importance". However, following an appeal to Rushmoor Council by the Spirit Pub Company, (Note: Previously a business component of Punch Taverns, and the current leaseholders of the building.) the building's ACV designation was removed later in 2013.
