= Edwin Collier =

English accountant and activist (1827–1899)

Edwin Collier FCA
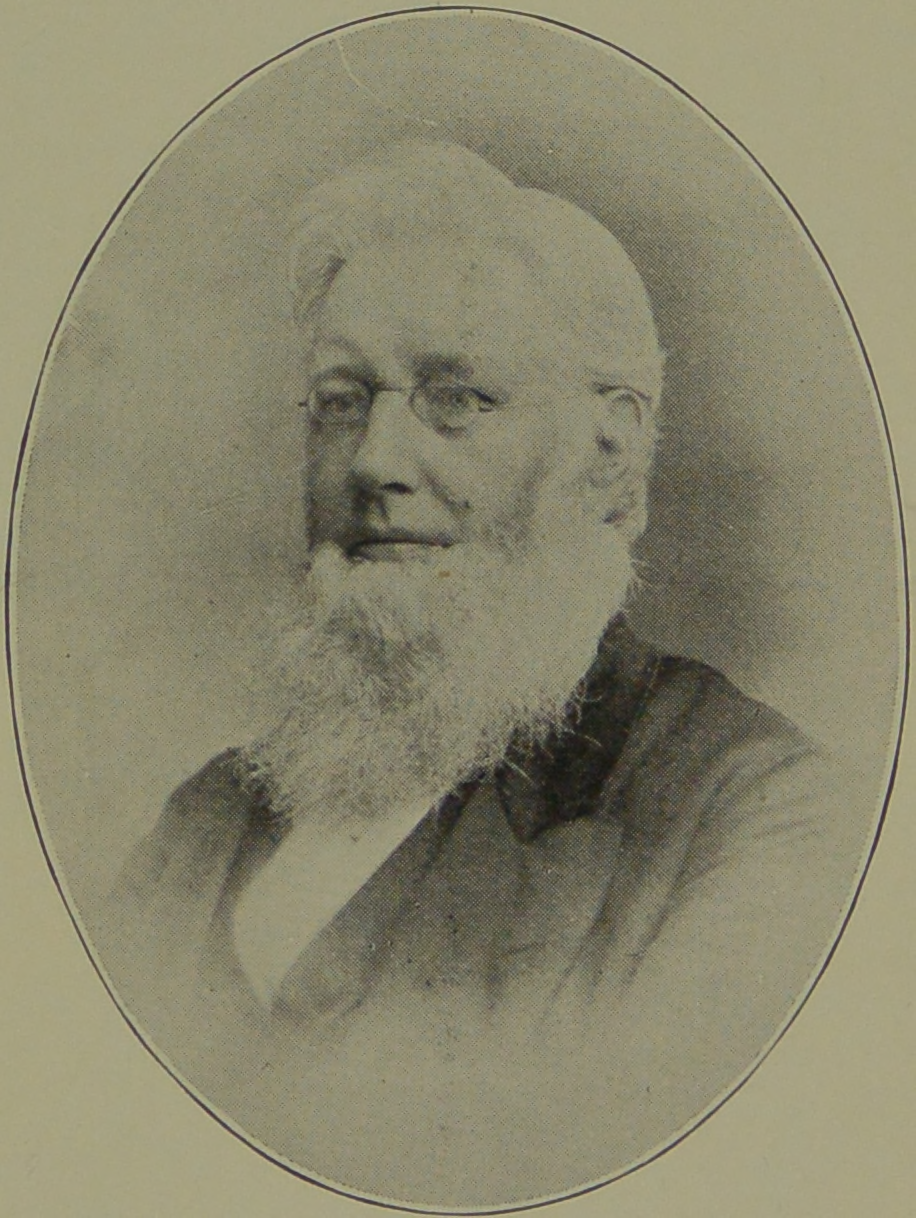
- Collier in Fifty Years of Food Reform (1898)
- Born: 27 March 1827; Hulme, Lancashire, England
- Died: 11 February 1899 (aged 71); Whalley Range, Manchester, Lancashire, England
- Resting place: Weaste Cemetery
- Occupations: Accountant; deacon; activist
- Organizations: Vegetarian Society (vice-president, honorary auditor and honorary treasurer); Bible Christian Church (deacon)
- Known for: Vegetarianism activism; Co-founding E. Collier, Tongue and Co.
- Spouse: Sarah Bennett (m. 1854; died 1883)
- Children: 4
- Relatives: James Gaskill (uncle); James Clark (brother-in-law)

Edwin Collier FCA (27 March 1827 – 11 February 1899) was an English accountant, deacon, and vegetarianism activist. Based in the Manchester area, he worked in the Huddersfield cloth trade and in the treasurer's department of the Salford Corporation before entering accountancy. He later became a partner in David Chadwick's accountancy firm and co-founded E. Collier, Tongue and Co.

Collier was a member of the Vegetarian Society from its first year and served as vice-president, honorary auditor, and honorary treasurer. He also chaired society meetings and was a shareholder in the Vegetarian Restaurants Co. Ltd. A vegetarian from birth, he belonged to a family connected with the Bible Christian Church and the early vegetarian movement. He served for about 40 years as a deacon of the Bible Christian Church in Hulme.

== Biography ==
=== Early life and education ===
Edwin Collier was born on 27 March 1827 in Hulme, then a township in the parish of Manchester, Lancashire, to George (1799–1866) and Margaret Collier (née Gaskill; 1802–1850). His uncle, Rev. James Gaskill (1800–1870), was a minister at the Bible Christian Church in Hulme, and his grandfather, Peter Gaskill, was a founding member of the church. His sister Cordelia married Rev. James Clark, a pastor of the church. Collier was a vegetarian from birth; his father adopted the diet in 1815 and his mother in 1812. Collier was described as a heavy tobacco smoker. He was also a teetotaller.

Collier grew up in Hulme and attended the Bible Christian Church School. He was also educated at Rivington Grammar School.

=== Career ===
Collier worked as a cashier for manufacturers in the Huddersfield cloth trade and in the treasurer's department of the Salford Corporation. He later became a partner in David Chadwick MP's accountancy firm. He subsequently co-founded E. Collier, Tongue and Co., described by the Weaste Cemetery Heritage Trail as one of the largest accountancy firms outside London. Collier was a Fellow of the Institute of Chartered Accountants and served on the council of the Manchester Society of Chartered Accountants.

=== Vegetarianism activism ===
Collier was a member of the Vegetarian Society from the year of its formation. He served as a vice-president for about 30 years, honorary auditor from 1873 to 1882, and honorary treasurer from 1882 to 1891. He helped organise the vegetarian dining room at the International Health Exhibition in 1884.

Collier took part in the society's public meetings and conferences. The York Herald reported on the society's annual meeting in Manchester on 14 October 1881, at which he acted as chairman. The Manchester Courier recorded that he presided over the 36th anniversary conference at the YMCA Hall, Manchester, on 19 October 1883, and the Exeter and Plymouth Gazette noted his role in chairing a society conference in Exeter. He was also a shareholder in the Vegetarian Restaurants Co. Ltd.

=== Religious work ===
Collier connected his advocacy of vegetarianism with Christian vegetarianism. He served for about 40 years as a deacon of the Bible Christian Church in Hulme. During a vacancy between ministers, he frequently occupied the pulpit. Collier also taught in the church's evening and Sunday schools, regularly giving four evenings a week and his Sundays to this voluntary work.

=== Personal life and death ===
Collier married Sarah Bennett on 25 May 1854 at Holy Trinity Church, Horwich. She was born in 1832 in Lostock, Bolton, to William and Betty Bennett. Sarah Collier was also a vegetarian and died on 12 November 1883, aged 52.

The couple had four children, all of whom were vegetarian. Their son Bennett was a Fellow of the Institute of Chartered Accountants and served as honorary auditor of the Vegetarian Society. Their daughter Dora married Leonard Greenhalgh, and both were described as lifelong vegetarians.

Collier died on 11 February 1899 at Whalley Range, Manchester, aged 71. He was interred in the Collier family grave at Weaste Cemetery. Collier's obituary in The Vegetarian Messenger described him in old age as tall and well built, with white hair.

== See also ==
- Christian vegetarianism
- History of vegetarianism
- Vegetarianism in the Victorian era
- Vegetarianism in the United Kingdom
- Temperance movement in the United Kingdom
