= Chef & Brewer =

UK pub restaurant chain

Chef & Brewer logo

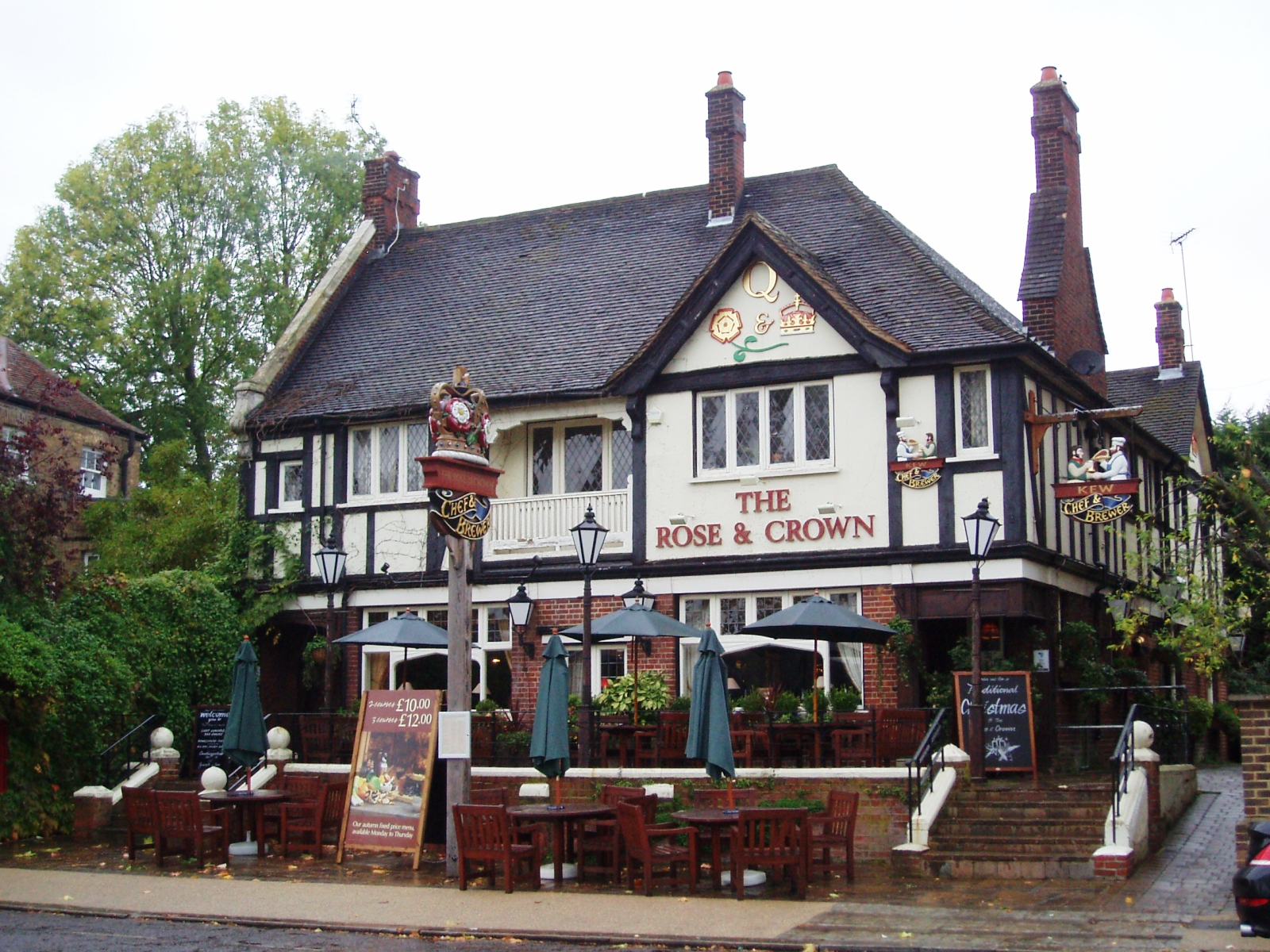
Rose and Crown, a Chef & Brewer pub, Kew, London

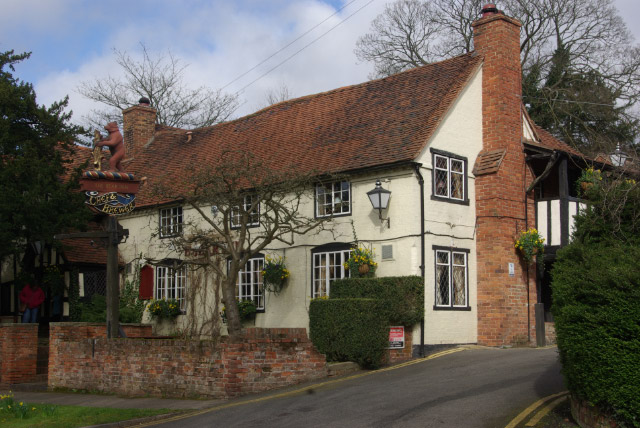
The Bear Inn, a Chef & Brewer pub, Berkswell

The Chef & Brewer collection is a group of more than 150 countryside pub-restaurants in the United Kingdom, owned by Greene King. The venues typically offer a menu of traditional pub food alongside seasonal specials, cask ales, and other drinks, with an emphasis on relaxed, rural settings.

== History ==
The leisure, manufacturing and property conglomerate Grand Metropolitan, which later became part of Diageo, sold the estate that formed the Chef & Brewer business to Scottish & Newcastle in 1993 in a part-cash, part-debenture deal worth £708 million. In 2003 Scottish & Newcastle auctioned the Chef & Brewer business, which was acquired by the Spirit Group. In 2005 the Spirit Group was itself acquired by Punch Taverns. Following its demerger from Punch Taverns in 2011, the Chef & Brewer chain became part of the newly formed Spirit Pub Company plc. Spirit was subsequently acquired by Greene King in June 2015.

The pubs have featured in Tesco Clubcard promotions and are part of the Blue Light Card scheme for emergency services personnel, the NHS, the UK teaching community, social care sector workers and the armed forces.

== Locations ==
A number of Chef & Brewer venues are based in historic public houses or former inns:

- The Barley Mow, Clifton Hampden, Oxfordshire, dating to 1352.
- The De Trafford Arms in Alderley Edge, Cheshire, dates back over 200 years.
- Hutt in Ravenshead, Nottinghamshire, was built in 1400.
- The Traveller's Rest in Nottingham served as a half-way house for herders of the Goose Fair.
- The Ferry Inn in Wilford, Nottingham, serving the namesake ferry crossing chartered by Edward III that served the city for centuries.
- The Blundell Arms in Horwich, Greater Manchester, dates back to at least the 17th century.
- The frontage of the Nags Head in Burntwood, Staffordshire, dates back to 1650.
- Gatwick Manor in Crawley, West Sussex, dates back to the 15th century.
