= Roger Myers (businessman) =

British Businessman (born 1947)

- Born: Roger Myers; 28 April 1947 (age 78); East Ham, England
- Education: Quintin Kynaston Grammar School
- Occupation: Businessman
- Title: Founder & Chairman, Punch Taverns
- Term: 1997–present
- Spouse: Lee Myers

Roger Myers (born 1947) is the co-founder of Punch Taverns, one of the United Kingdom's largest chains of public houses.

== Early life ==
Born in East Ham and educated at Quintin Kynaston Grammar School, Roger Myers joined Goodman Myers Smith, a firm of accountants in 1964.

== Career ==
In 1966 he became a Partner in the firm which helped artists such as the Beatles minimise their tax. In 1977, working with Tony Visconti, he formed the Good Earth Productions record label, producing records for artists including David Bowie and Marc Bolan.

Then the following year he broke with Visconti and, working with Alan Lubin, established Peppermint Park, a cocktail bar in Covent Garden, as well as the Coconut Grove and Fatso's Pasta Joint restaurants. They then sold the cocktail bar and the restaurants to Courage who employed them to set up the Dome Brasserie chain. Myers then acquired the cocktail bar, the restaurants and the Dome and floated them as Theme Holdings: the business was subsequently sold to Leisure Investments plc.

In 1989 he established Café Rouge and adding other themed restaurants created the Pelican Group. He sold the business to Whitbread in July 1996. In 1997, together with business partner Hugh Osmond, he founded Punch Taverns. In 1999 Punch purchased Inn Business Group plc, and later Allied Domecq's pubs for £3 billion, beating a rival bid from Whitbread. After the deal, Punch spun off its managed pubs into a separate division, Punch Retail, which was later renamed Spirit Group.

In 2002 Punch demerged the Spirit Group and then floated itself on the London Stock Exchange. Punch went on to become Britain's second largest pub landlord.

In 2005, he moved to St Lucia “to drink rum and do nothing”. Then he purchased The Jalousie Plantation Hotel and completed a multimillion dollar transition that saw the property re-branded and re-launched as Sugar Beach, A Viceroy Resort on 30 November 2012, under the continued management of the Viceroy Hotel Group. Viceroy has managed the property since 2008.

In 2016, The Times and Sunday Times Travel Awards recognized Sugar Beach, A Viceroy Hotel as 'The Best Long-haul Hotel In The World'.

In 2019, Myers sold Sugar Beach to Misland Capital.
