= Blundell Arms =

Pub in Horwich, Greater Manchester, England

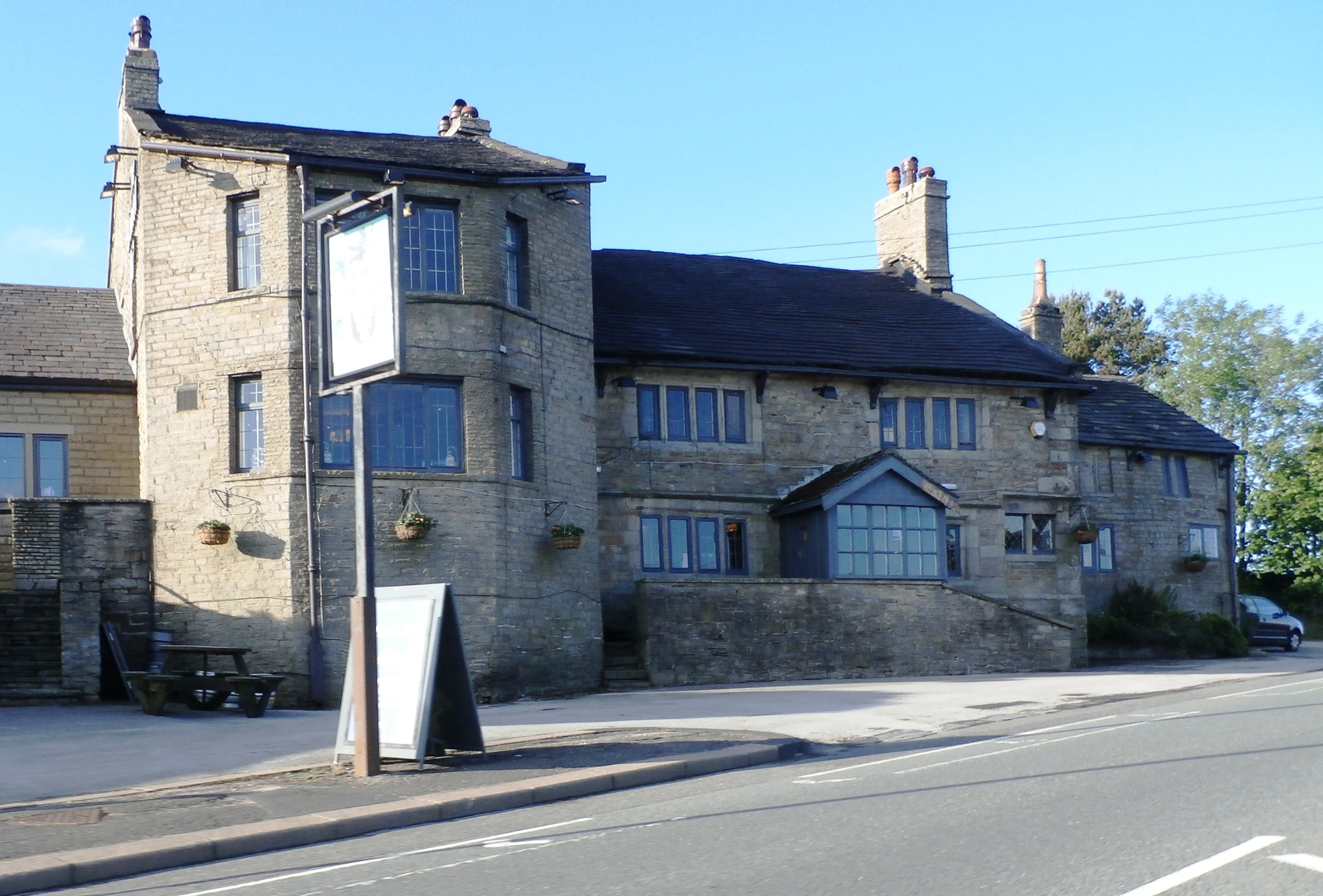
- The pub in 2015

- Location within Greater Manchester
- Alternative names: Horwich Moor Gate; Moorgate Inn

General information
- Type: Public house
- Location: Chorley Old Road, Horwich, Greater Manchester, England
- Coordinates: 53.5952°N 2.5061°W
- Years built: 17th and early 19th century
- Owner: Greene King

Design and construction
- Designations

Listed Building – Grade II
- Official name: Blundell Arms public house
- Designated: 24 November 1966
- Reference no.: 1067323

Website
- Official website

The Blundell Arms is a Grade II listed public house on Chorley Old Road in Horwich, a town on the edge of the West Pennine Moors in the Metropolitan Borough of Bolton, Greater Manchester, England. The building has 17th‑century origins with early 19th‑century work. It now forms part of the Chef & Brewer group and is owned by Greene King.

== History ==
The Blundell Arms originated as a 17th‑century building, with further work carried out in the early 19th century, according to its official listing.

Trade directories list a Blundell Arms on this site as early as 1825, and a 1938 report in The Bolton News, reprinted in 2001, recalled that the premises were known locally as the Moorgate Inn around 1838. The 1894 Ordnance Survey map, however, labels the building as the Horwich Moor Gate public house. By 1909 it was again recorded under the Blundell Arms name.

On 24 November 1966, the Blundell Arms was designated a Grade II listed building. By 1982 the pub was operating as a Greenall Whitley establishment. As of 2026, the Blundell Arms forms part of the Chef & Brewer group and is owned by Greene King.

== Architecture ==
The building is constructed in dressed stone with a stone‑slate roof. It has two storeys and a front arranged in five bays. The left‑hand bay projects forward, is angled, and rises slightly higher than the rest, while the two right‑hand bays are set back and lower. The projecting bay has a mix of narrow and wide windows and a round‑arched opening to the cellar. The next two bays contain multi‑light windows, including one where an earlier doorway has been filled in. A later porch stands at the main entrance, reached by steps. The end bays have three‑light windows, and another former doorway now contains a casement window. There are signs of an earlier entrance in the projecting bay.

On the upper floor, some windows are blocked, boarded, or partly infilled. Chimneys stand along the roofline and at the gable end. At the back are lean-to additions, and the left gable wall has blind window openings. Inside, there is a fireplace with a corbelled stone lintel.

== See also ==
- Listed buildings in Horwich
- Listed pubs in Greater Manchester
