= James Gaskill =

English cotton spinner and social reformer (1800–1870)

The Reverend James Gaskill
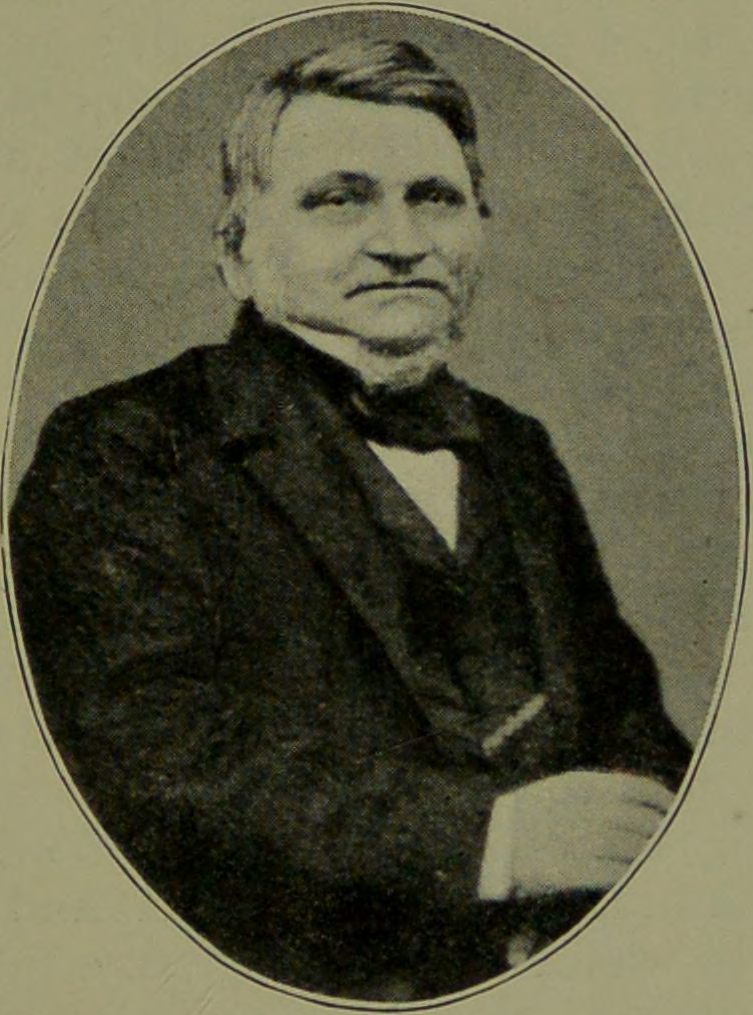
- Gaskill in Fifty Years of Food Reform (1898)
- Born: 1800; Newton, near Hyde, Cheshire, England
- Died: 17 August 1870 (aged 70); Hulme, Manchester, England
- Resting place: Weaste Cemetery
- Occupations: Cotton spinner; social reformer; Bible Christian minister
- Known for: Temperance and vegetarianism activism
- Relatives: Edwin Collier (nephew)

James Gaskill (1800 – 17 August 1870) was an English cotton spinner, social reformer, and Bible Christian minister. He was associated with the temperance and vegetarianism movements.

== Biography ==
=== Early life ===
Gaskill was born in 1800 in Newton, near Hyde, Cheshire, to Peter Gaskill (1777–1857) and Elizabeth Fletcher (1772–1839). His father was a founding member of the Bible Christian Church and initially worked as a farmer before moving to Manchester in 1821 to become a cotton spinner. Gaskill had three sisters: Margaret (b. 1806), Hannah (b. 1809), and Sarah (1811–1832).

At the age of 10, Gaskill and Alfred Hardy were appointed assistant masters at the Grammar School and Academy of Science, established by the Bible Christian Church in Salford under Rev. William Cowherd. The church, known for its vegetarian principles, later contributed to the formation of the Vegetarian Society.

=== Career ===
Gaskill worked as a cotton spinner in Horwich. In 1823, at the age of 23, Gaskill became minister of the Hulme Bible Christian Church, succeeding James Scholefield, who had moved to another chapel in Ancoats. Under Gaskill's leadership, the congregation raised funds to build a schoolroom, later known as Hulme Christ Church Institute. Gaskill was also involved in local governance, serving on the Chorlton-on-Medlock Board of Guardians and as a director of the Manchester Mechanics' Institute.

=== Social reform ===
Gaskill advocated for vegetarianism and attended the 1847 conference in Ramsgate, where the formation of the Vegetarian Society was proposed. He served as a local secretary of the Society. He later served as president of the Bolton Vegetarian Association.

Gaskill was also involved in the temperance movement, promoting total abstinence through organisations including the United Kingdom Alliance and the Manchester and Salford Temperance Union.

=== Personal life and death ===
Gaskill never married. He was a close friend of Joseph Brotherton and a contemporary of Henry Hunt. Edwin Collier was Gaskill's nephew.

Gaskill died at his home in Hulme on 17 August 1870, aged 70. He was buried at Weaste Cemetery. His memorial service was presided over by Rev. James Clark, who referred to his work in education, philanthropy, and social reform. Gaskill bequeathed donations in his will to the International Peace Society, the United Kingdom Alliance, the Manchester and Salford Temperance Union, the Hulme Free Library, the Vegetarian Society, and the Bible Christian Church.

== See also ==
- Christian vegetarianism
- History of vegetarianism
- Vegetarianism in the Victorian era
- Vegetarianism in the United Kingdom
- Temperance movement in the United Kingdom
