= Punch Pubs =

Pub and bar operator in the United Kingdom

Punch Taverns Limited
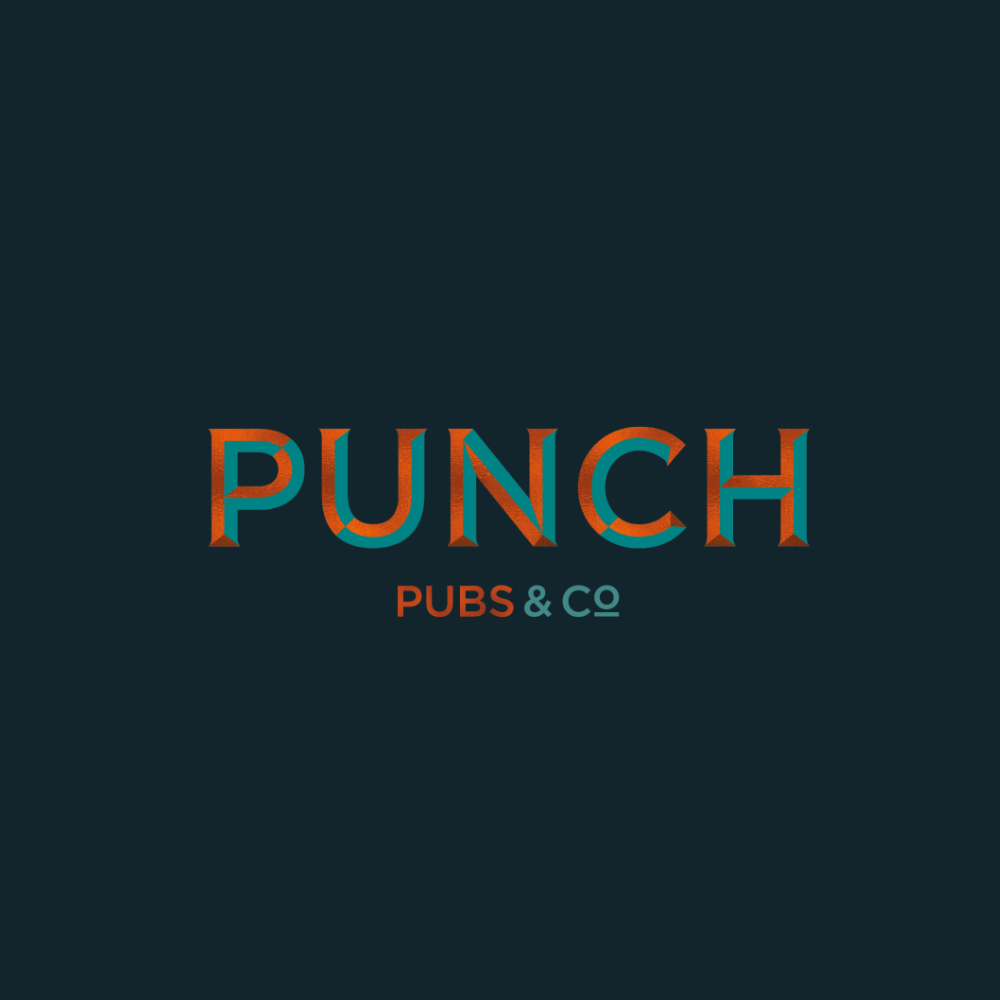
- Punch Pubs & Co Logo
- Type: Private company
- Industry: Pubs
- Founded: 1997; 29 years ago
- Headquarters: Burton upon Trent, England, UK
- Key people: Taylor Hunter (Chairman); Andy Spencer (CEO); Steve Dando (CFO)
- Revenue: £420.8 million (2015)
- Operating income: £183.9 million (2015)
- Net income: £ loss 82.6 million (2015)
- Number of employees: 409 (2015)
- Parent: Fortress Investment Group
- Website: www.punchpubs.com

Punch Pubs & Co is a pub and bar operator in the United Kingdom based in Burton upon Trent, England, with around 1,300 leased pubs. It was listed on the London Stock Exchange as a constituent of the FTSE SmallCap Index until its sale in 2016 for £403 million to a private equity fund, Patron Capital, acting in concert with Heineken International who acquired 1,900 of Punch's pubs as part of the deal.

== History ==
The company was established by former PizzaExpress head Hugh Osmond and Café Rouge founder Roger Myers in 1997, when they bought the Bass Brewery portfolio of public houses. In 1999, Punch purchased Inn Business Group plc, and later Allied Domecq's pubs for £3 billion, beating a rival bid from Whitbread. After the deal, Punch spun off its managed pubs into a separate division, Punch Retail, which was later renamed Spirit Group.

In 2002, Punch demerged the Spirit Group and then floated itself on the London Stock Exchange. Punch acquired its larger rival Pubmaster in November 2003 for £168 million, which included taking on Pubmaster's £1 billion debt; the move took the group to more than 7,000 pubs and made it at the time the largest pub operator in the UK. After completing this deal, Punch later bought InnSpired Inns plc, and then Avebury Taverns.

Meanwhile, Spirit Group (at that time independent from Punch Taverns) expanded when it acquired Scottish & Newcastle's 1,450-strong pub estate in 2003, beating off rival Mitchells & Butlers.

In September 2005, Spirit Group sold its "City Nights" portfolio of in excess of 180 pubs and clubs, en-bloc, to Alchemy - the financial backers behind the newly formed Tattershall Castle Group (TCG).

In December 2005, Punch agreed to re-acquire the Spirit Group for £2.68 billion which since 2002 had been owned by the private equity firms Blackstone, Texas Pacific and CVC Capital Partners.

In 2006, the company sold its Old Orleans pub chain, which it had acquired when it bought Spirit Group, to Regent Inns. Punch also sold 290 Spirit sites to the private equity firm GI Partners.

In March 2008, Punch withdrew from a bid to merge with Mitchells & Butlers.

On 22 March 2011, Punch announced that as part of a strategic review it would demerge its managed pub division. Spirit Pub Company was established as a separate company and took over 803 managed pubs and 549 leased pubs. This included the branded pubs Chef & Brewer, Taylor Walker Pubs, Fayre & Square, Original Pub Company, Flaming Grill Pub Company, John Barras Pub Company, Wacky Warehouse and Good Night Inns. Each shareholder in Punch received one share in Spirit Pub Company. The demerger was effective on 1 August 2011. Spirit was subsequently acquired by Greene King in 2015.

In October 2015, Punch disposed of its 50% holding in Matthew Clark, a drinks wholesaler and distributor, to Conviviality Plc.

In December 2016, the company accepted a takeover bid totalling £403 million (or 180 pence per share). Around 1,900 pubs were to be sold to Heineken International for £305 million. The remaining 1,300 pubs and the company's liabilities were taken over by Patron Capital & May Capital.

Punch was sold to US investment management company Fortress Investment Group in 2021. Fortress is 70% owned by Abu Dhabi's sovereign wealth fund, Mubadala.

== Operations ==
=== Leased pubs ===
Punch had 4,096 pubs as at 17 August 2013. Of this total, 2,990 were classed as core. The company's stated aim is to make each core pub "the best of its type in its marketplace". The remaining 1,106 are classed as non-core. The company operates non-core pubs to maximise short-term returns with a focus on costs and cash-flow, with an expectation that most will be sold within four years. Approximately 1,100 non-core pubs had been sold between 2011 and 2013.

=== Debt and going concern ===
The company and its subsidiaries have issued loan notes in two separate tranches; tranche A (£1,449 million of debt secured on 2,356 pubs) and tranche B (£884 million of debt secured on 1,675 pubs). In their 2013 annual report, approved on 24 September 2013, the directors stated that the group was in compliance with its covenants and had adequate cash resources for the foreseeable future. However, the directors stated that it was in the best interests of all stakeholders to achieve a consensual renegotiation of both of the securitisations. If a covenant breach were to occur and if loan note holders were to require immediate repayment, then the ability of the group to continue as a going concern would be in doubt.

== Criticism ==
Punch Taverns was one of the companies reviewed as part of a 2009 House of Commons monopolies inquiry into pub groups. On 13 May 2009, the report was published, and it "raises a series of questions about the pub company (pubco) tied pub business model and calls on the Government to act urgently, in particular, to refer the matter to the Competition Commission. It challenges the pubcos which operate a tie to prove its benefits by giving lessees the choice between a tied or free of tie lease." The report also raises issues regarding the actual conduct of pubcos in dealing with struggling tenants. Shortly following the committee's report CAMRA issued a 'Super-Complaint' forcing the Office of Fair Trading to investigate this within 90 days. The OFT published its report on 22 October 2009. The report largely cleared the industry of behaving in any way that caused damage to consumers.

== See also ==
- Anchor Bankside
