= Holy Trinity Church, Horwich =

Holy Trinity Church
- The Parish Church of the Holy Trinity, Horwich
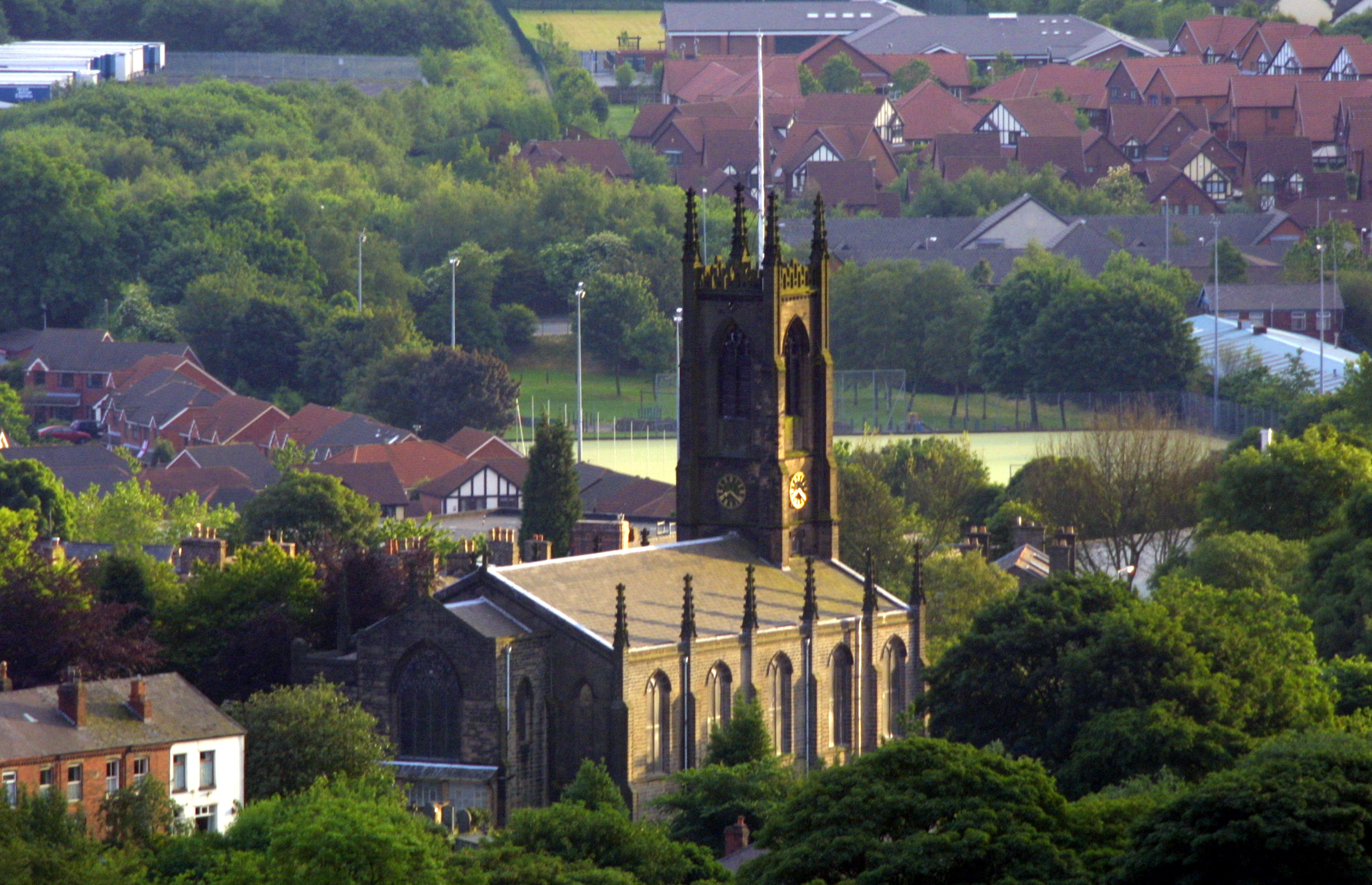
- Horwich Parish Church
- Holy Trinity Church
- 53.5991°N 2.5374°W
- OS grid reference: SD 64442 11538
- Location: Horwich, Greater Manchester
- Country: England
- Denomination: Church of England
- Website: Holy Trinity Church at achurchnearyou.com

History
- Status: Parish Church
- Founded: before 1552
- Dedication: Holy Trinity
- Consecrated: 1831 (present church)

Architecture
- Heritage designation: Grade II listed building
- Architect: Francis Octavius Bedford
- Style: Gothic Revival

Specifications
- Materials: Sandstone

Administration
- Province: York
- Diocese: Manchester
- Deanery: Bolton
- Benefice: Horwich and Rivington

Holy Trinity Church, commonly known as Horwich Parish Church, is a Grade II listed building in Church Street, Horwich, Greater Manchester, England. It is an active Church of England parish church in the Deanery of Bolton, the Archdeaconry of Bolton, and the Diocese of Manchester. Holy Trinity Church is one of four churches which form the united Benefice of Horwich and Rivington; the other three are St Catherine's Church and St Elizabeth's Church in Horwich, and Rivington Parish Church.

== History ==
There have been three chapels or churches on the site of Holy Trinity Church. It is not known when the first chapel was built, but it existed before the English Reformation when it was a chapel of ease to the parish church of St Mary the Virgin's Church, Deane. In 1565, the "commissioners for removing superstitious ornaments" took various items they considered idolatrous from the chapel. The earliest gravestone in the churchyard has the initials and date M.H. 1648, however, the church registers only commenced in 1660. After the Glorious Revolution in 1688, the chapel was used by Nonconformists, but in 1716 the Bishop of Chester recovered the chapel for the established church.

As the town expanded during the Industrial Revolution and the population increased, the old chapel was replaced by a larger building in 1782. Almost fifty years later, the second chapel was replaced by the present church which was designed by Francis Octavius Bedford and consecrated in 1831. It is a Waterloo or Commissioners' Church, partly paid for by money from the parliament of the United Kingdom raised by the Church Building Act 1818, and said to be a celebration of Britain's victory in the Battle of Waterloo. The Commissioners paid £5,621 (equivalent to £500,000 in 2025), the remainder was provided by the Ridgway family, owners of Wallsuches Bleach Works. Horwich became a parish on 29 December 1853 and the chapel-of-ease became the parish church.

The chancel, designed by Bolton architect Richard Knill Freeman, was added to the east end of the church in 1903 in memory of the Reverend Henry Septimus Pigot, vicar for 48 years.

== Structure ==
Exterior

Holy Trinity Church is built in stone with a slate roof in the Gothic Revival style. It has a four-bay nave with Y-tracery lights between the buttresses which are topped with crocketed pinnacles. The chancel is shallow with a four-light traceried east window. There are porches on the north and south sides. The west tower has octagonal turrets which become angled buttresses above roof level and open tracery embattled parapet with corner crocketted pinnacles. The tower has a four-sided clock and louvred bell openings.

Interior

The church has north, south and west galleries supported by chamfered diagonal piers. There is a plaster rib vaulted ceiling. Reredos with cresting and canopy date from 1923. At the west end of the nave is one of the church's original box pews. The organ loft has a three-light mullioned window. There is a stained glass window of 1874 in the south aisle and the east window dates from 1927 incorporating some earlier glass and the Ridgway arms in the tracery at the head of the window. The Ridgway arms and crest, carved in stone, and a monument to Joseph Ridgway, the church's benefactor in the form of a robed woman kneeling at prayer by Richard Westmacott, are also displayed in the church. The family vault of the Barons Willoughby of Parham is at the church.

The tower holds a ring of eight bells, hung for change ringing. The whole ring was cast by John Taylor & Co of Loughborough in 1913.

== Burials ==
- Thomas Willoughby, 11th Baron Willoughby of Parham (under the chancel)

== Churchyard ==
The churchyard contains the war graves of 26 service personnel, 22 of World War I and four of World War II.

== Clergy ==
Curates of Holy Trinity Chapel, Horwich.

- Circa 1565: Peter Mackinson.
- Circa 1621: Edward Tempest.
- Circa 1637: Henry Whittle.
- circa 1641–ejected 1648: James Walton.
- 1650–ejected 1651: Henry Pendlebury, B.A.
- Circa 1656–1657: John Isherwood, B.A.
- Ejected 1662: John Walton.
- OCC. 1671: John Barton.
- 1702–1720: John Horobin, B.A.
- 1720–1724: Nathan Pierpoint, B.A.
- 1724–1731: Robert Harvey, B.A.
- 1731–1765: John Norcross, Snr., B.A.
- 1765–1788: John Norcross, Jnr., B.A.
- 1788–1826: Samuel Johnson, M.A.
- 1826–1852: David Hewitt, B.A.

Vicars of Holy Trinity Church, Horwich.

- 1853–1901: Henry Septimus Pigot, M.A.
- 1901–1908: G. H. St. P. Garrett, M.A, B.D.
- 1908–1921: Samuel Shephard
- 1921–1923: Robert Jenning Cross, M.A.
- 1923–1927: Robert C. Worsley, B.A.
- 1927–1936: Thomas Backhouse, M.A.
- 1936–1942: Fred Addison, M.A.
- 1942–1953: Thomas Murray, S.Th.
- 1953–1961: Douglas R. Mitchell, M.A.
- 1962–1972: George V. H. Elliott, M.A.
- 1972–1999: Denis W. Gatenby, M.A.
- 1999–2020: Stephen Fletcher, M.A.

== See also ==
- List of churches in Greater Manchester
- Listed buildings in Horwich
- List of Commissioners' churches in Northeast and Northwest England
