= Spirit Pub Company =

British pub company

Spirit Pub Company plc
- Company type: Public
- Traded as: LSE: PUB
- Industry: Pubs
- Founded: February 1999
- Defunct: June 2015
- Headquarters: Burton upon Trent, England, UK
- Key people: Mike Tye (chief executive officer); Walker Boyd (non-executive chairman)
- Revenue: £ 800.9 million (2014)
- Operating income: £ 121.2 million (2014)
- Net income: £ 99.4 million (2014)

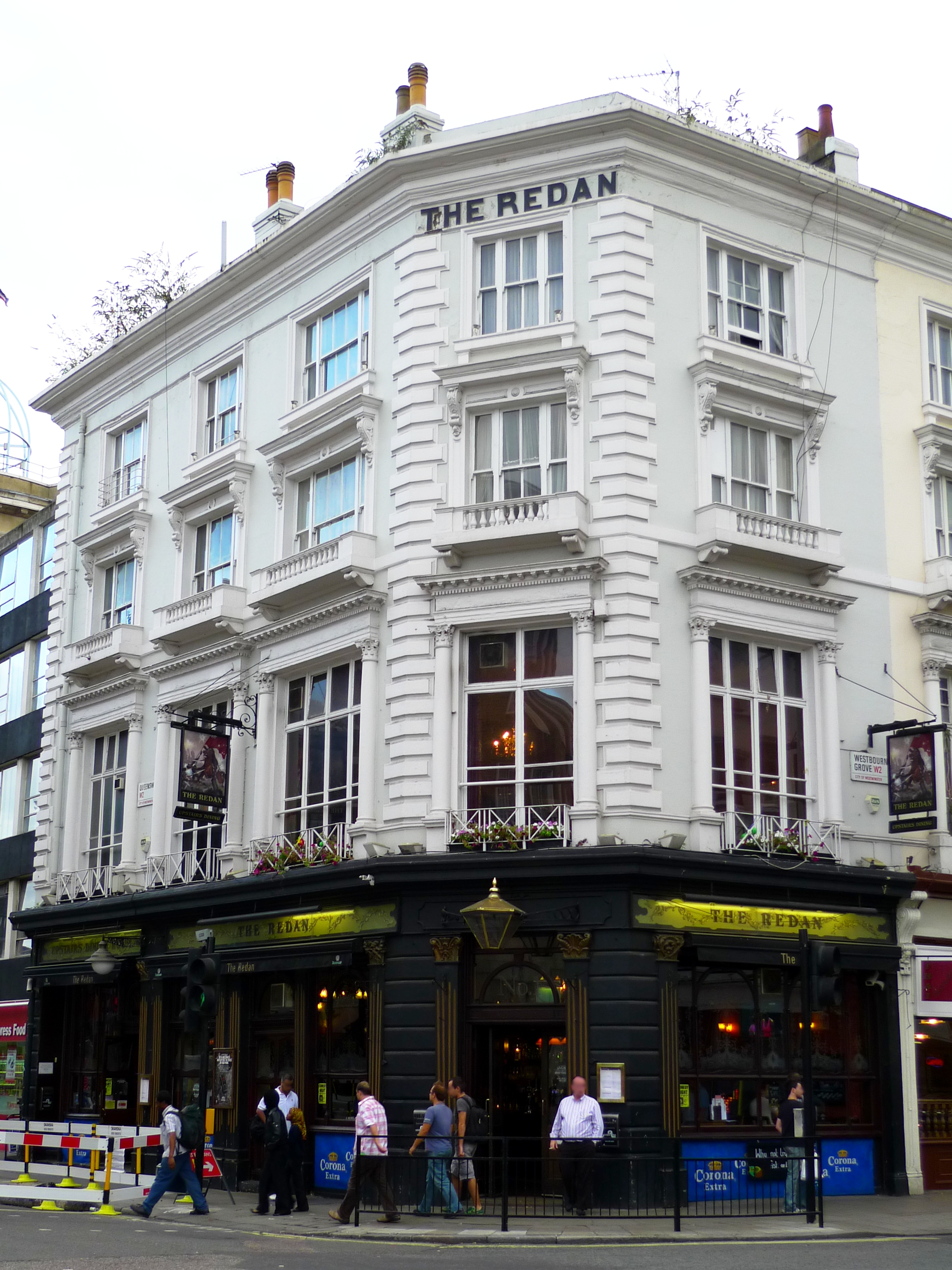
The Redan in Bayswater, one of Spirit's pubs (September 2009)

Spirit Pub Company plc (Spirit) was a pub and restaurant company in the United Kingdom based in Burton upon Trent and originally formed by Punch Taverns. It was listed on the London Stock Exchange until it was acquired by Greene King in June 2015.

== History ==
Spirit Group was originally formed by Punch Taverns in February 1999 to operate its managed pub estate including pubs acquired from Allied Domecq. Spirit Group was demerged by Punch in February 2002. Spirit Group then acquired Scottish & Newcastle’s retail business, before itself being re acquired by Punch in May 2006. Spirit was demerged from Punch Taverns for a second time in August 2011.

The shareholders accepted a takeover offer from Greene King in January 2015. The takeover was completed in June 2015.

== Operations ==
Spirit had seven hundred and seventy seven branded managed pubs throughout the United Kingdom in August 2013, and a further 452 leased pubs. Spirit employed an average of 16,800 people in 2013.

Its properties were valued at £1,375m by August 2013. It had net debt of £891m including £147m of interest rate swap obligations. It proposed a restructuring of its bond obligations.

== Taylor Walker ==
There were 120 pubs of Taylor Walker mostly in West and Central London, which competed with Nicholsons. The name is taken from the Taylor Walker Brewery, which was founded in 1730 in Stepney. Following the takeover by Greene King the brand Taylor Walker was retired, with pubs being brought under the brand Greene King.

== Other brands ==
Spirit's other brands were Chef & Brewer, Fayre & Square, Flaming Grill, John Barras, and Original Pub Company. In addition, Spirit Pub Company operated Wacky Warehouse, the largest soft play and activity centre brand in the United Kingdom and Good Night Inns, a group of hotels next to their pub restaurants.
