= Horwich =

Town in Greater Manchester, England

Coordinates: 53.592°N 2.540°W

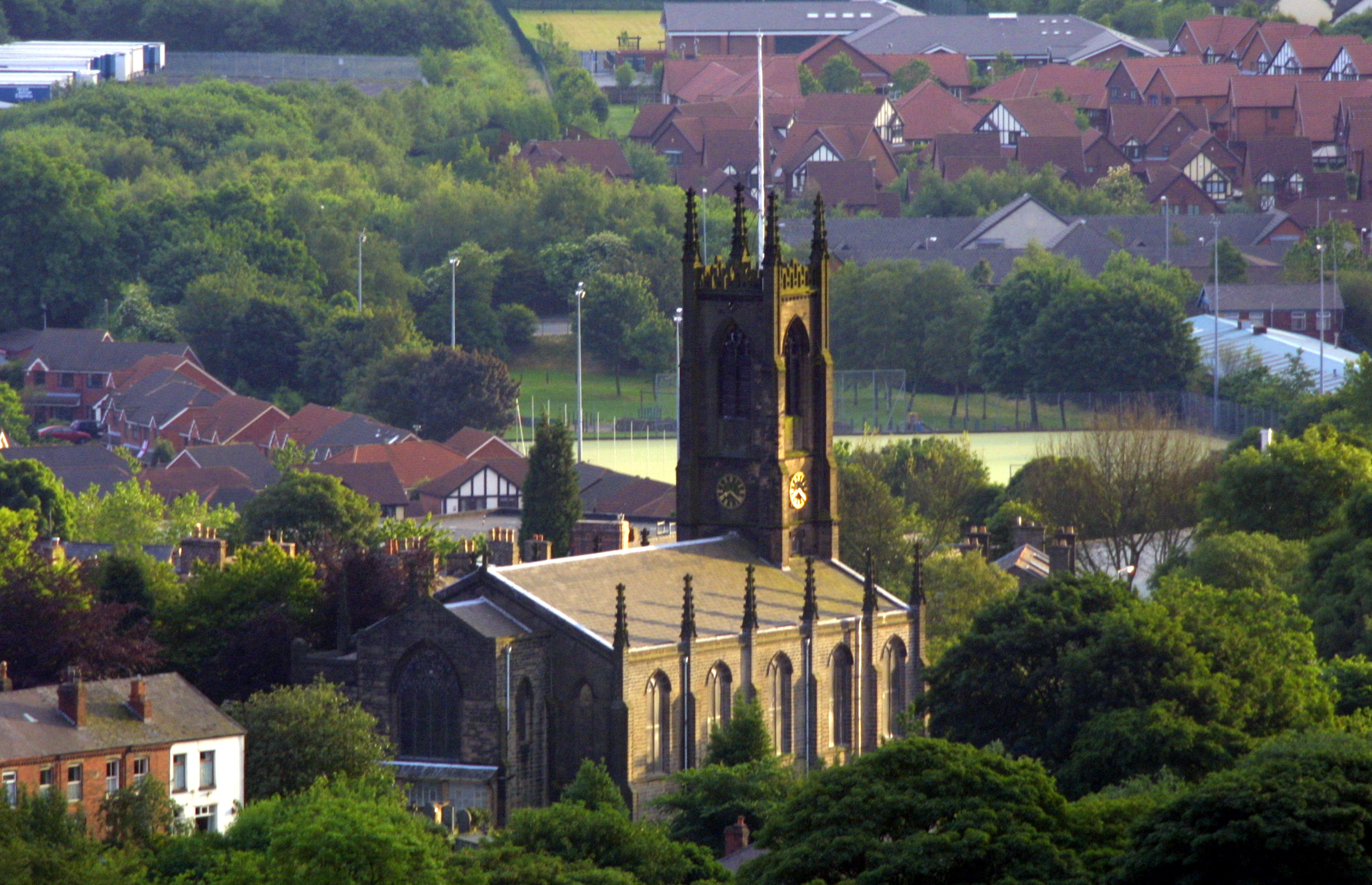
- Horwich Parish Church

- Location within Greater Manchester
- Population: 20,690 (2021 Census)
- OS grid reference: SD639114
  - London: 177 mi (285 km) SE
- Civil parish: Horwich
- Metropolitan borough: Bolton
- Metropolitan county: Greater Manchester
- Region: North West
- Country: England
- Sovereign state: United Kingdom
- Post town: Bolton
- Postcode district: BL6
- Dialling code: 01204
- Police: Greater Manchester
- Fire: Greater Manchester
- Ambulance: North West
- UK Parliament: Bolton West
- Website: www.horwich.gov.uk

Horwich (/ˈhɒrɪtʃ/ HORR-itch) is a town and civil parish in the Metropolitan Borough of Bolton, Greater Manchester, England, within the historic county boundaries of Lancashire. It is 5.8 miles (9.3 km) northwest of Bolton Town Centre, 5.3 miles (8.5 km) southeast of Chorley and 15 miles (24 km) northwest of Manchester. It lies at the southern edge of the West Pennine Moors with the M61 motorway passing close to the south and west. At the 2011 Census, Horwich had a population of 20,067.

Horwich emerged in the Middle Ages as a hunting chase. Streams flowing from the moors were harnessed to provide power for bleachworks and other industry at the start of the Industrial Revolution. The textile industry became a major employer and after 1884 the construction of the railway works caused the population of the town to increase dramatically. The old industries have closed and urban regeneration has been led by out of town developments, particularly at Middlebrook, which, since 1997 has been the base of Bolton Wanderers football club, who play at the Toughsheet Community Stadium, having moved from Burnden Park near Bolton town centre.

== History ==
The name Horwich derives from the Old English har and wice, meaning the place at the grey wych-elm and in 1221 was recorded as Horewic. The name was recorded as Harewych in 1277 and Horewyche in 1327.

=== Horwich Forest ===
Ancient records are of Horwich Forest being overrun with wolves in the time of Ecgfrid, ruler of Northumbria until 685, 'Smithills walled round to keep them at bay'. Around this time early Saxon Kings used the forest for the chase, while staying at the ancient Smithells Hall, records exist of Ælla of Northumbria making use of the forests for hunting. Ecgberht (Egbert) is a notably visitor associated with the area in this early period. Horwich developed from a 'bridge point settlement' on the River Douglas at what is now Scholes Bank. By the Middle Ages Horwich was a hunting chase, after the Norman Conquest held by Albert de Gresle between 1086 and 1100. In 1277 Robert Gresle, Baron of Manchester prosecuted Martin de Rumworth for carrying off deer in Horwich Chase which was described in 1322 as being within "a circuit of sixteen leagues with a yearly value in pannage, aeries of eagles, herons and goshawks, in honey, millstones, and iron mines, in charcoal-burning, and the like issues, 60 shillings; of which the vesture in oaks, elms and wholly covered with such, 160 marks." In 1294 Thomas Gresle, sixth Baron of Manchester obtained free warren over "Horewich". The local enforcement of Forest Law was through a Bailiff who served the Lord of the Manor and it was he who decided punishments. Trespassers in the forest were brought before the Manorial Court Leet. The decline of Horwich forest is connected to the dissolution when Henry VIII seized all the church lands and then sold them.

=== Pre-industrial ===
By the 16th century, subsequent to the reformation land ownership had shifted from Church to the crown and was then sold to new owners, who transformed the town into an agricultural economy, and forests were cleared. Many of the farms from the period still existed until the housing boom of the 19th and 20th centuries, like many Lancashire towns the cotton industry was prominent as at least a secondary occupation in many households, weaving became a widespread occupation, and industries like bleaching, dying and paper making grew from the use of water power with the towns preindustrial plentiful access to flowing water. The town continued this path until the arrival of the railway workshops in the 19th century.

In 1598 a number of men were presented at the court leet for tithing and in 1621 the court leet recorded "paid for hue and crye that came from Horwich after the man who made an escape forth of ye stocks for stealing certain lynen cloth 8d". The earliest map of Horwich is dated 1620 and is known as 'The Platt of Horwich', naming the landowner as Sir Thomas Barton, of the Barton family of Holme Hall in the manor of Holme Newark and Smithills Hall, Bolton. A plague pit is noted on the map, with victims of a 1623 outbreak, interred in a mass grave under what is now Lever Park Avenue. The existence of the pit is likely a local myth coming about by modern additions to a copy of an older map. By the 17th century, the amount of woodland in the Horwich forest was reduced by house building and for fuel. Horwich Moor was enclosed between 1815 and 1818. Race meetings were held between 1837 and 1847 at the 'Old Lords estate', an area next to the Rivington border, named after 11th Baron Willoughby. Four Barons Willoughby of Parham are interred at Horwich Parish Church.

The manor became the property of the Andertons of Lostock Hall, Lostock, who purchased it in 1599 from Nicholas and Elizabeth Mosley. These lands were confiscated by The Crown in 1715 after the Battle of Preston. They were leased to the Blundells whose coat of arms is displayed above the door at the Blundell Arms on Chorley Old Road.

The Pilkington family were notable in the town's history, prior to the Ridgways. The town coat of arms incorporates the Pilkington Cross, in recognition of the founder of the Rivington and Blackrod High School, James Pilkington, Bishop of Durham and the prominent role in the local history of the family. Richard Pilkington, a leading non-conformist and owner of Horwich Manor, and his family feature in the town's history from the post Protectorate to the industrial revolution being benefactors and founders of a number of places of worship. Another William Pilkington (1765–1831) became a physician and apothecary in St Helens. It is this branch that links Horwich to the founders of Pilkington Glass, his sons being Richard (1795–1869) and William (1800–1872).

=== Industrial Revolution ===
In the 1770s brothers, John and Joseph Ridgway, land agents to the Blundells, moved their bleach works from Bolton to Wallsuches. Their works was the oldest and one of the few stone-built mills in the Bolton borough. The firm was one of the earliest users of chemical bleaching using chlorine. In 1798 the firm installed a Boulton and Watt steam engine.

Horwich Vale Printworks, founded in 1799 by the River Douglas, printed cloth using machines and handblocks. On the slopes of Winter Hill, stone was quarried and there were several small collieries and a firebrick and tile works. In 1896 the Montcliffe Colliery was owned by Adam Mason and Son and managed by Joseph Crankshaw and Joseph Kenwright. It employed 26 men underground and seven surface workers getting coal and fireclay from the Mountain coal seam. Crankshaws pipeworks used the fireclay and had had several beehive kilns at their works at Tiger's Clough. In the mid-19th century, cotton mills were built by W. & W. Bennett and Peter Gaskell.

Ridgways provided land for the early 19th century Club Houses, a grid pattern development of streets of stone built cottages south of Church Street. Some had basements for hand loom weaving. In 1851 the occupants were crofters, stovers and bleachers.

=== Heavy industry ===
In 1881 the population of 3,761 lived in 900 houses and had remained stable for fifty years. The arrival of the railway works and other industries, including W.T. Taylor's cotton mill, was to dramatically change this. A rapid increase in population followed, so that by 1891 it stood at 12,850.

Coming with this increased population was a need for more houses, schools, and retail and service industries to provide for this new population. Large areas of former farmland was built on with the creation of vast numbers of brick terraced house streets of Victorian and Edwardian types of two-up two-down for the working class who had arrived from across Britain and Ireland, still used in the 21st century. Many new streets near Horwich Locomotive Works were named after famous engineers of the time. Local government in Horwich meets and is administered from a typical Victorian-style building which became known as Horwich Public Hall, a gift to the town by Peter Martin of The Street, Rivington in 1879 and still in use. The post-war years saw a boom in the builds of Council Houses.

In 1937 the de Havilland Aircraft Company built a factory that supplied aircraft to Cobham's Flying Circus. During World War II the factory manufactured variable pitch propellers for Spitfires, making it a target for German bombers, who in July 1942 attempted to raid the factory by employing some of Germany's best pilots and crews in two Junkers JU 88 bombers in a mission using the Rivington reservoirs as landmarks to navigate at low level flying over the water then rooftops of Lever Park to find its target. The raid went off course due to low clouds. The company was taken over by Hawker Siddeley and subsequently British Aerospace, the site was halved and moved to the south side of Hall Lane, Lostock when taken over by MBDA in 1997 it is still in 2013 making missiles and the site is now used for integration and test purposes. Thirty-five acres (14 hectares) of the former BAe site was sold off to developers in 2000. Horwich works was very active in armament production in the first and second world wars, in recognition George VI and his wife Queen Elizabeth visited the town in 1940.

==== Railway town ====
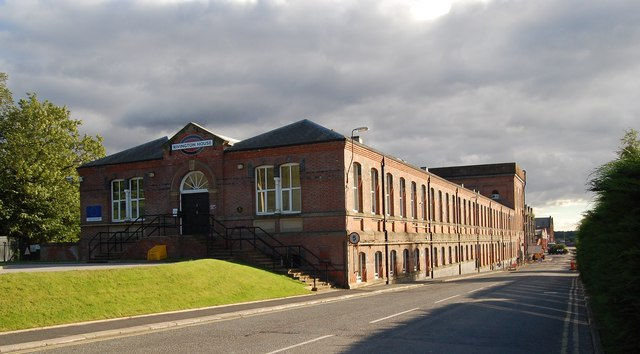
Rivington House, Horwich Works

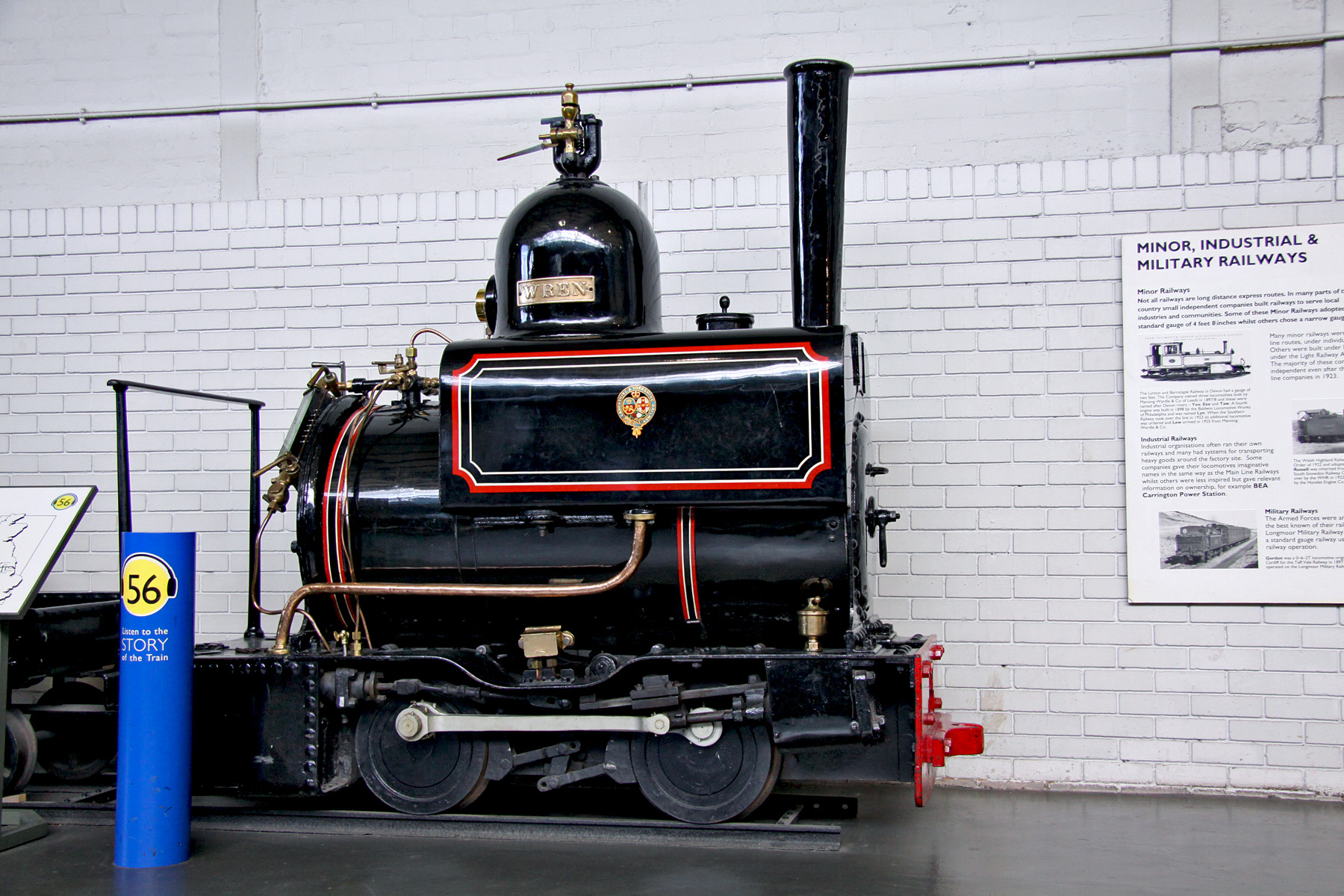
Horwich Works 18-inch gauge 0-4-0 locomotive

In the period of the railway works from spring 1884 to 1983 Horwich changed drastically. The site first opened as the Lancashire and Yorkshire Railway (L&YR) works, leading to a large complex for building and maintaining locomotives, the site replaced one at Miles Platting.

Horwich Works was built on 350 acres (142 hectares) of land bought for £36,000. In 1911, the entire town was 3,254 acres (1,317 hectares). The first workshop, Rivington House opened in February 1887. It is 106.7 m (350 ft) long by 16.8 m (55 ft) wide. The long brick built workshops had full-height arched windows and were separated by tram and rail tracks. Work to construct the three-bay, 463.3 m (1,520 ft) long, 36 m (118 ft) wide, erecting shop began in March 1885. Inside it were 20 overhead cranes. By November 1886 the first locomotives arrived at the works for repair.

The first Horwich built locomotive, Number 1008, left the works in 1887 and is preserved at the National Railway Museum.

In the First and Second World War, the works played a part in the war effort manufacturing tanks and munitions. The war led to women being employed in manufacturing at the site, but this did not continue in post-war years with occupational inequality persisting.

The L&YR amalgamated with the London and North Western Railway in 1922 becoming a constituent of the London, Midland and Scottish Railway, (LMS) in 1923.

Horwich Works continued to build and repair locomotives for the LMS until the company was nationalised in 1948 by the Transport Act 1947, becoming British Railways. In 1962, British Railways transferred control of its main works to British Railways Workshops Division, with its headquarters in Derby. In 1970 it was renamed British Rail Engineering Limited (BREL) and remained the town's most significant employer.

Production changed and the last steam locomotive built at Horwich Works left on 27 November 1957, after which the works produced shunting diesel trains until 28 December 1962. It was reduced to repairing engines and maintaining railway wagons. On 18 February 1983, BREL announced that the works would close at the end of the year. Protest marches and spirited trade union resistance failed to alter the decision and at 1 pm on Friday, 23 December 1983 Horwich Works closed after 97 years. The town went through a period of high unemployment afterward, The freehold of the railway works site was transferred from British Rail to Bolton Council in the mid-1990s.

A proposal to demolish the works and build 1,700 homes and a school was submitted to Bolton Council in early 2010. The initial phase of the development commenced in 2019.

Asbestos used to insulate steam engines and railway carriages linked to mesothelioma has been a legacy affecting former workers and their families with asbestos dust also being carried in clothing. The redevelopment of the site required it to be cleared of contaminants before building commenced.

With the closure of Horwich Locomotive Works and other heavy industries, the town went through a period of hardship until the development of the Middlebrook Retail Park and the arrival in the town of Bolton Wanderers Football Club, which revived the service and retail sectors, alongside this the town is now known for sub-urban residential accommodation with the benefit of access to the motorway and other transport links. The economic area is centered around the Middlebrook area, this is planned to expand with new industrial areas being built toward Blackrod.

== Governance ==
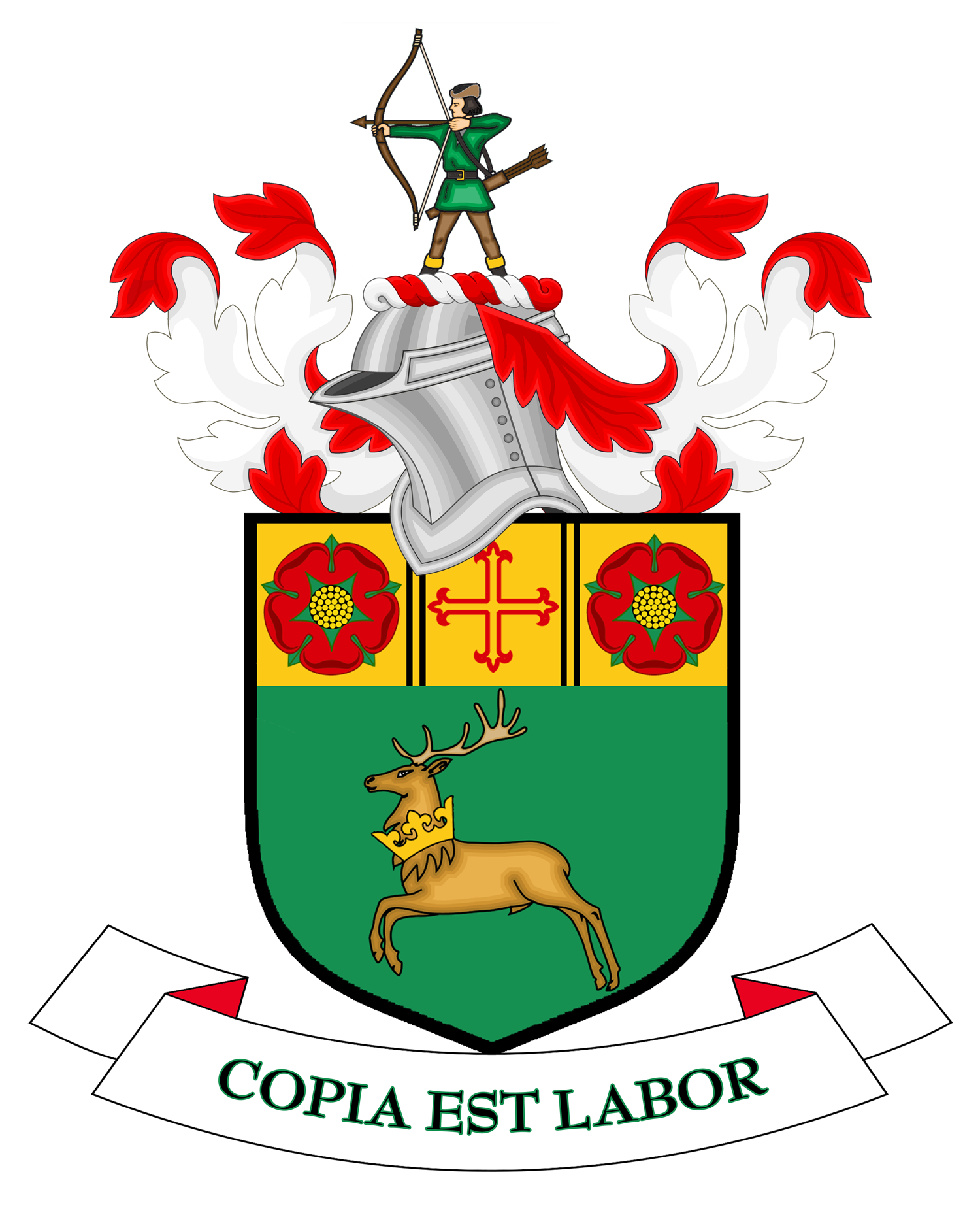
The coat of arms of Horwich Town Council

Horwich was within the county boundaries of Lancashire from the 12th century and was a township in the historic ecclesiastical parish of Deane, in the Hundred of Salford. In 1837 Horwich joined with other townships and civil parishes to form the Bolton Poor Law Union and took joint responsibility for the administration and funding of the Poor Law in that area and built a workhouse in Farnworth. The Horwich Local board of health was established in 1872 and was superseded by Horwich Urban District of the administrative county of Lancashire in 1894. Under the Local Government Act 1972 Horwich Urban District was abolished in 1974 and its area became a successor parish of the newly created Metropolitan Borough of Bolton in Greater Manchester and was removed from the county of Lancashire.

On 9 January 1974 Horwich was granted a Town Charter by the Earl Marshal, giving Horwich the status of a town, a town council and the ability to elect a Mayor. An official coat of arms was granted and assigned on 6 December 1974 by the Earl Marshal.

Horwich is covered by two electoral Wards of the Bolton Metropolitan Borough Council, the Horwich South and Blackrod, and Horwich North Wards. Each Ward elects three councillors to the Metropolitan Borough Council. Horwich Town Council, formed in 1974, has eight Wards; Vale, Bridge, Lever Park, Church, Claypool, Brazley, Central and Fall Birch which elect 14 representatives to the Town Council.

Horwich is part of the Bolton West Constituency. Its Member of Parliament is Phil Brickell from the Labour Party who first won the parliamentary seat at the 2024 General Election.

== Geography ==
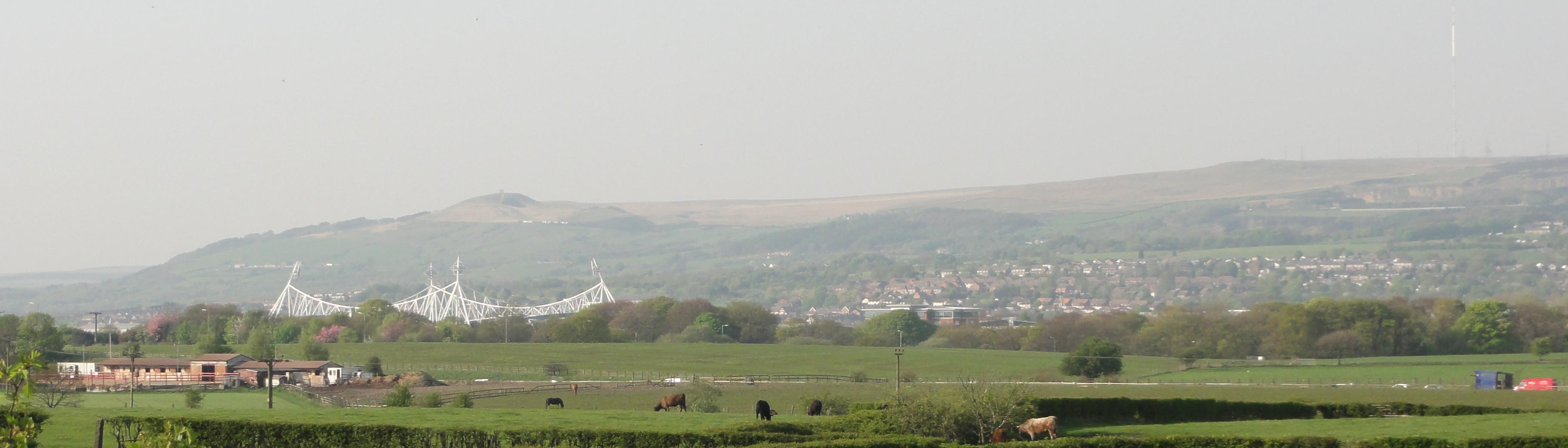
Football stadium and Town with Rivington Pike in background

Suburban localities in Horwich include Wallsuches and Middlebrook.

Horwich extends to 3,230 acres (13.1 km^{2}) and measures 3 miles (4.8 km) from north to south and 2 miles (3.2 km) west to east. The River Douglas flowing in a south westerly direction forms part of its northern boundary. The landscape to the north is dominated by Winter Hill, Rivington Pike and the West Pennine Moors. The highest point is 1,475 feet (450 m) on the moors in the north from where the ground slopes down towards the south and west, where the lowest land is about 350 feet (110 m). On Wilders and Horwich Moors the underlying rock is Millstone Grit, and in the intermediate slopes are found the Lower Coal Measures of the Lancashire Coalfield. The Middle Coal Measures are found in the southwest of the township.

Red Moss, 1.5 km south of the town centre, is a 47.2 hectares (117 acres) Site of Special Scientific Interest (SSSIs) which was designated in 1995 because of its biological interest. Red Moss is the best example of lowland raised mire in Greater Manchester and is one of 21 SSSIs in the area. The site is managed by the Wildlife Trust for Lancashire, Manchester and North Merseyside.

== Demography ==
Horwich Compared
2001 Census	Horwich	Bolton (borough)	GM Urban Area	England
Total population	19,312	261,037	2,240,230	49,138,831
White	97.9%	89.0%	90.3%	90.9%
Asian	1.0%	9.1%	6.2%	4.6%
Black	0.4%	0.6%	1.3%	2.3%

At the 2001 UK census, Horwich had a population of 19,312 of which 9,370 were male and 9,942 were female. The 2001 population density is lower than Bolton at 12.5 people per hectare compared to 18.7 in Bolton. At the 2011 UK census, Horwich's population increased to 20,067 of which 9,777 were male and 10,290 were female. The 2011 census recorded a total of 9,013 households, of which were 1,979 detached houses, 2,642 semi-detached houses, 3,254 terraced houses, 971 purpose-built flats, 160 other flats (including bedsits), and 7 caravans (or other mobile or temporary structure).

=== Population change ===
Until the late 18th century, Horwich was a small rural community. In 1774, it had a population of 305, comprising 156 females and 149 males. After 1780 the population increased as the Industrial Revolution brought changes to the town but remained constant until 1885 when the locomotive works were built more than trebling the population in ten years.

Population changes in Horwich since 1801

Year	Population	±%
1801	1,565	—
1811	2,374	+51.7%
1821	2,873	+21.0%
1831	3,562	+24.0%
1841	3,773	+5.9%
1851	3,952	+4.7%
1861	3,471	−12.2%

Year	Population	±%
1871	3,671	+5.8%
1881	3,761	+2.5%
1891	12,850	+241.7%
1901	15,084	+17.4%
1911	16,285	+8.0%
1921	15,661	−3.8%
1931	15,680	+0.1%

Year	Population	±%
1939	14,995	−4.4%
1951	15,549	+3.7%
1961	16,078	+3.4%
1971	16,465	+2.4%
1991	18,514	+12.4%
2001	19,312	+4.3%
2011	20,067	+3.9%

Sources: (a) Local Statistics. (b) A vision of Britain through time. (c) Neighbourhood Statistics.

== Economy ==
Many of Horwich's traditional industries, Horwich Works and W.T. Taylor's cotton mill closed in the late 20th century. Regeneration was led by the construction of the Toughsheet Community Stadium for Bolton Wanderers at Middebrook in 1995. The development which stretches into neighbouring Lostock, attracted industrial and commercial users including Hitachi, generating jobs to replace those lost in the old industries and the area is now dominated by small and medium enterprises. E.ON and RBS have set up offices close to the Toughsheet Community Stadium. Watson Steel Structures founded in 1933 and BAe's successor company, Matra BAe Dynamics operates from the Middlebrook area. Georgia Pacific owned a paper manufacturing plant close to the Toughsheet Community Stadium, which in 2012 was bought by SCA and later Sofidel Group, who decided to close it in 2017. Halbro, manufacturers of sportswear and equipment for both codes of rugby, is based on Chorley New Road.

There are Tesco and Asda stores on the outskirts of town and Aldi and Iceland stores closer to the town centre. The Horwich indoor market building was closed and demolished in 2009, but the traditional town centre has many small, specialist shops and businesses, including a greengrocers, butchers, florist and gift shops. Free parking is available across the town and there is a post office and library in the town centre.

== Transport ==
Public transport is co-ordinated by Transport for Greater Manchester. The nearest railway stations are at Blackrod and Horwich Parkway adjacent to the University of Bolton Stadium where there is a Park and Ride facility with trains to Bolton, Manchester and Preston. Blackrod station is nearer to the town centre. The original Horwich railway station was closed in the Beeching cuts to passenger traffic on 27 September 1965, goods traffic continued until 1966, the line was fully closed in 1967.

Frequent buses operate between Horwich and Bolton. The 575 is operated by Arriva North West, with Arriva services terminating in Wigan. Stagecoach Cumbria and North Lancashire provide services to Preston and Bolton via Chorley and Adlington. Bus links to Middlebrook Retail Park are provided by Diamond Bus North West services 516 (Evening and Sunday services only), 517 and 518 which all between Horwich and Leigh via Westhoughton and Atherton. Service 576, which operates from Bolton to Wigan via the Middlebrook and Blackrod areas in Horwich also runs in the evenings.

Horwich is situated close to the motorway network with access at junction 6 of the M61 motorway. The A673 Bolton to Preston road passes through the town which is accessed by the B6226 and B5238.

Manchester Airport is 50 minutes by direct train from Horwich Parkway railway station.

== Media ==
Local news and television programmes are provided by BBC North West and ITV Granada. Television signals are received from the nearby Winter Hill TV transmitter situated north east of the town.

Local radio stations are BBC Radio Manchester, Heart North West, Smooth North West, Greatest Hits Radio Bolton & Bury, Capital Manchester and Lancashire and Bolton FM, a community-based radio station which broadcast from its studios in Bolton.

Horwich Advertiser is the local newspaper including other regional newspapers, The Bolton News and Manchester Evening News.

== Education ==
The Lancashire and Yorkshire Railway Company built the Railway Mechanics Institute in 1888. It became the Technical College but has been demolished.

Horwich secondary school students years attend either Rivington and Blackrod High School, a Specialist Technology College which was originally the Rivington & Blackrod Grammar School on a site in Rivington close to the boundary with Horwich, or St Joseph's RC High School on Chorley New Road. The oldest school building is the old Horwich Parish School which was built as a National, Infant and Sunday School in 1793 and now used as a parish hall and is a Listed building. Horwich Parish Church of England Primary School occupies the listed premises built in 1832.

Our Lady's school was built in 1886 on Chorley New Road and Holy Family Primary School on Victoria Road in 1894. Holy Family was the first Lancashire County Council school to be granted aided status under the Education Act 1944. The schools merged on the Victoria Road site as St. Mary's RC Primary School.

List of schools in Horwich
School	Type/Status	Ofsted
Chorley New Road Primary School	Primary	105178
Claypool Primary School	Primary	105195
Horwich Parish CE Primary School	Primary	105233
Lord Street Primary School	Primary	105179
St Catherine's CE Primary School	Primary	132785
St Mary's RC Primary School	Primary	105250
Lever Park School	Special	131692
Rivington and Blackrod High School	Secondary & Sixth form	105261
St Joseph's RC High School	Secondary	105262
Alliance Learning	Work-based learning	50387

== Religion ==
Prior to the reformation a chapel of ease existed dedicated to St Mary's Church in Deane. In 1565 the commissioners for "removing superstitious ornaments" took various items that were deemed idolatrous from the chapel. The local population were forced by various means to conform to the Church of England and as with all other towns and villages across the country Catholicism was suppressed and it was not until 1886 when Father Hampson opened St Mary's Roman Catholic Church on Chorley New Road that the local Catholic population had a formal place of worship. The presbytery there was built by Father McGrath in 1906.

After the English Civil War, with the contrivance of the vicar of Deane, the Chapel of Horwich was used by nonconformists and in 1669 a conventicle, meeting of nonconformists, was reported at Horwich and the ringleaders were prosecuted. In 1672 a nonconformist service was held at Old Lord's Farm, the home of the puritan Major Thomas Willoughby, a soldier of the Protectorate of Oliver Cromwell, who later become 11th Baron Willoughby of Parham. In 1716 Bishop Gastrell of Chester recovered the chapel for the established church. The chapel was replaced in 1782 and rebuilt as Holy Trinity Church, a Commissioners' Church, in 1831. Until 1853 became a parish in its own right with Holy Trinity as the parish church. After the non conformists were ejected from Horwich Chapel, Richard Pilkington built "New Chapel" between 1716 and 1719. It was enlarged in 1805. In 1890 the Unitarian Free Church was built on Church Street. In the 18th and 19th centuries other nonconformist churches and chapels were built.

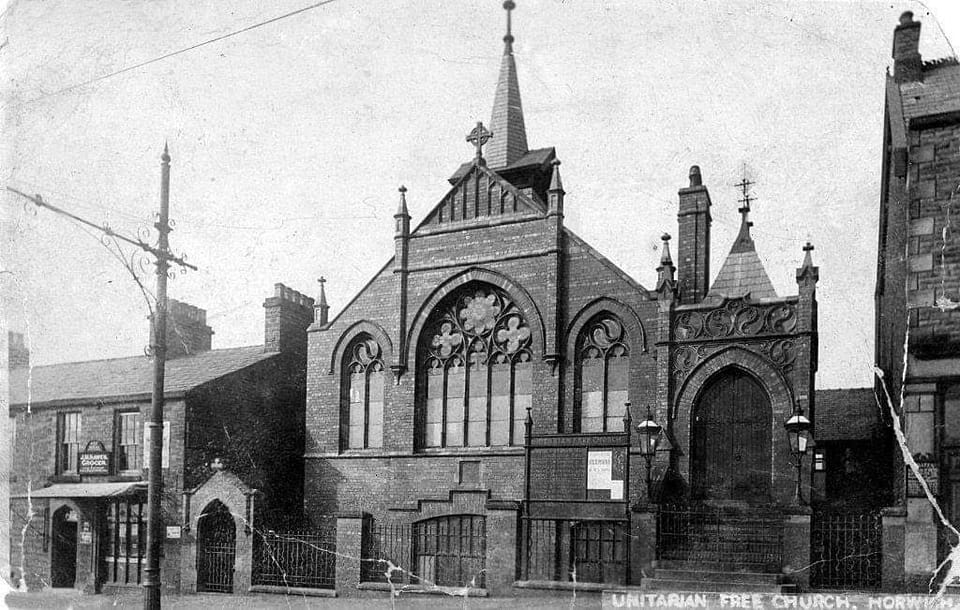
Horwich Unitarian

Lee Lane Congregational Church, founded in 1754, closed in 2005 and was converted into flats. It was originally built in 1856 on the site of an earlier build known as Horwich Lee Chapel built in 1774 on the site of an earlier house, also owned by Thomas Willoughby and was used for meetings from 1682 by Presbyterian members splitting away from the Rivington Unitarian Chapel as its doctrine changed.

The Independent Methodist chapel in Lee Lane was built in 1867, Methodism had been practised from 1810. Primitive Methodists had a chapel on Horwich Moor and where a Baptist church was built in 1890.

== Sport ==
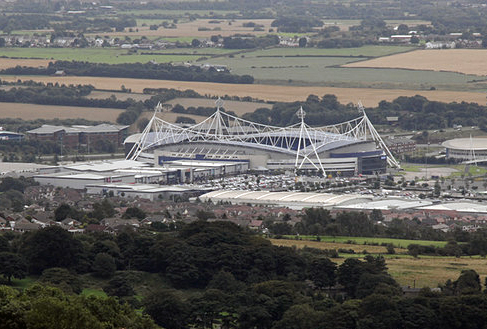
Toughsheet Community Stadium from Crooked Edge Hill

Bolton Wanderers F.C. play at the Toughsheet Community Stadium having moved from Burnden Park near Bolton town centre in 1997. Indoor facilities for sports training and major racket sports tournaments are provided at Bolton Arena, which was used for badminton events in the 2002 Commonwealth Games.

Several of the town's sporting organisations have origins in the sport and social clubs of Horwich Locomotive Works. Horwich RMI Harriers and Athletic Club founded in 1924, is based at Middlebrook and participates in road, fell and cross country races, track and field athletics. Horwich Cycling Club was founded in 1934 as the Horwich Wheelers. It is involved in the organisation of the Horwich Carnival Road Races, held in the town centre. Horwich RMI Cricket Club was founded in 1892. The club plays in the Bolton Cricket League which it joined in 1934.

== Twin town ==
In March 1990, Horwich and Crowborough, East Sussex entered into a unique twinning arrangement when they became the first towns within the United Kingdom to sign a town twinning charter. It was signed by the Mayors of Horwich and Crowborough at a ceremony in the Public Hall, Horwich on 22 March 1990 and the Town Hall, Crowborough on 27 March 1990. On the 25th anniversary of the Town Twinning, in March 2015, the Mayor of Horwich, Cllr. Richard E W Silvester and the Mayor of Crowborough, Cllr. Ronald G Reed signed 25th Anniversary celebratory Town Twinning documents in Crowborough Town Hall on Tuesday 10 March 2015 and in Horwich Public Hall on Thursday 19 March 2015, to re-new the twinning agreement. Horwich Cycle Club members travelled down to Crowborough on Friday 15 May 2015 and cycled with members of Wealden Cycle Club over that weekend as part of the celebrations.

== Notable people ==
- James Gaskill (1800–1870), cotton spinner, lived locally, Bible Christian minister and advocate of temperance and vegetarianism.
- Barbara Ronson (1942–2018), politician from Horwich, Mayor of Bolton 2007–2008
- David Crellin (born 1961), an actor, lives locally, played Billy Hopwood in Emmerdale
- Vernon Kay (born 1974), brought up locally, TV broadcaster and former model.
- Jenny Ryan (born 1982), television personality; professional quizzer on The Chase.

=== Sport ===
- Jimmy Hodson (1880–1938), footballer who played 427 games including 252 for Oldham Athletic
- Tom Bamford (1887–1944), footballer who played 137 games for Burnley
- Gordon Astall (1927–2020), footballer, he played 456 games including 235 for Birmingham City & 188 for Plymouth Argyle
- Gordon Atherton (born 1934), footballer who played 327 games for Bury
- Ray Aspden (1938–2021), footballer, who played 297 games for Rochdale
- Paul Mariner (1953–2021), football player who played 555 games including 260 at Ipswich Town

== See also ==
- Listed buildings in Horwich

== Bibliography ==
- Ashmore, Owen (1982). The Industrial Archaeology of North-west England. Manchester University Press. ISBN 978-0-7190-0820-7..
- Farrer, William; Brownbill, J., eds. (1911). Victoria History of Counties of England, Lancashire. London: Constable and Co. pp. 1, 4–14, 19, 25, 27, 35, 133–134, 148, 260, 285–286, 297, 298.
- Hampson, Thomas (1883). Horwich: Its History, Legends, and Church. Wigan: "Observer" Office.
- Harland, John (1861). Mamecestre: being chapters from the early recorded history of the barony; the lordship or manor; the vill, borough, or town, of Manchester, Vol. 53. Manchester: Chetham society.
- Lane, Dave (2008). Winter Hill Scrapbook. Lulu. ISBN 978-1-4092-2068-8..
- Smith, M.D. (1988). About Horwich. Chorley: Nelson Brothers Printers Limited. ISBN 0-9508772-7-1.
- Smith, M.D. (1999). More About Horwich. St Michael's on Wyre: Wyre Publishing. ISBN 0-9526187-4-5..
