= Wallsuches =

Coordinates: 53.5991°N 2.5206°W

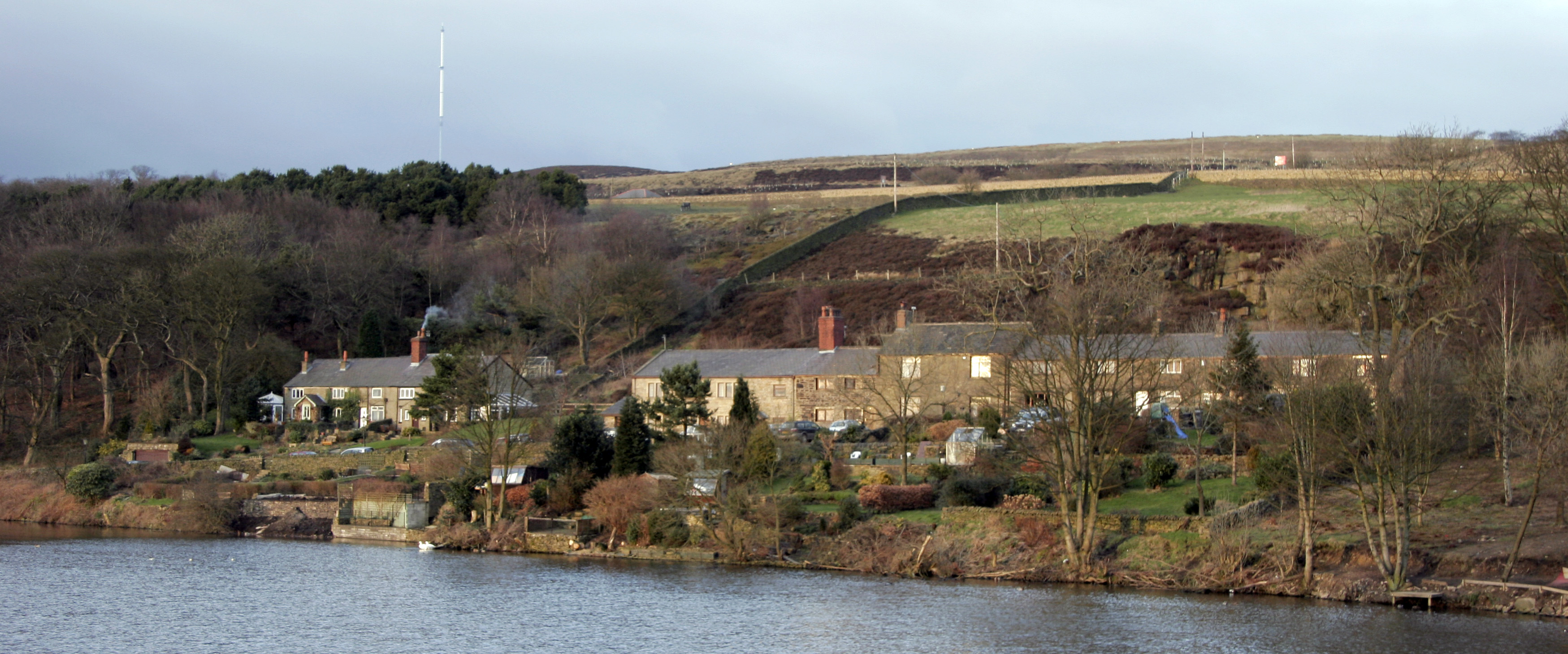
- Small row of cottages on a track that is now called "Top'oth Wallsuches", with Winter Hill Mast in the background

- Location within Greater Manchester
- OS grid reference: SD655115
- Civil parish: Horwich
- Metropolitan borough: Bolton
- Metropolitan county: Greater Manchester
- Region: North West
- Country: England
- Sovereign state: United Kingdom
- Post town: BOLTON
- Postcode district: BL6
- Dialling code: 01204
- Police: Greater Manchester
- Fire: Greater Manchester
- Ambulance: North West
- UK Parliament: Bolton West

Wallsuches is a small district of Horwich, Greater Manchester, England.

== Toponymy ==
The origin of the place-name itself is unclear, although it is believed the name may be from Old English wella (or the regional dialect variant wella) "stream" and soc "to soak", from Old English socian "to make wet/damp". This is probably because there are several streams running through the area from the moors.

== History ==
Historically a part of Lancashire, Wallsuches was first built on substantially by the Ridgway family in the 1770s. Thomas Ridgway Snr. owned a bleach works in Bolton until 1770 when a fire destroyed most of the stock and equipment. Wallsuches was selected as the new site due to the availability of land and streams to provide water power to run the bleach works and cotton mill. The main road through Horwich to Bolton had been improved, which was good for business access and employees. In 1777, the new works were opened as "Thomas Ridgway and Sons". At the time Horwich was a hamlet of 320 residents, mostly self-employed farmers and cotton weavers. "Wallsuches Bleach Works" brought employment to Horwich and workers came from Horwich, Blackrod, Adlington and Rivington. Wallsuches was highly successful, and by 1780 the former shippon and hut had been converted into a bleach works powered by six water wheels.

The Ridgways lived across the main access road from the works in a house called "Whitehouse", which they renamed "Ridgmont House", which still stands. Thomas Ridgmont sponsored French chemists Matthew Vallet and Anthony Bourboulon de Boneuil who pioneered the development of chemical bleaching, using chlorine and Wallsuches became one of the first to use the technology. Beforehand, bleaching was carried out using sunlight.

The bleach works operated as one of the main industries in Horwich until 1933. The works were closed and the site became derelict and run-down. The area has since been developed for housing by Redrow, incorporating the Grade II listed buildings.

== See also ==
- Joshua Routledge
