= Chorley Borough Council elections =

Elections in Lancashire, England

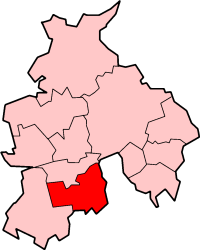
Chorley shown within the non-metropolitan county of Lancashire (Unitary authorities excluded)

Chorley Borough Council elections are generally held three years out of every four, with a third of the council elected each time. Chorley Borough Council is the local authority for the non-metropolitan district of Chorley in Lancashire, England. Since the last boundary changes in 2020, 42 councillors have been elected from 14 wards.

== Council elections ==
- 1973 Chorley Borough Council election
- 1976 Chorley Borough Council election (New ward boundaries)
- 1979 Chorley Borough Council election
- 1980 Chorley Borough Council election
- 1982 Chorley Borough Council election
- 1983 Chorley Borough Council election
- 1984 Chorley Borough Council election
- 1986 Chorley Borough Council election
- 1987 Chorley Borough Council election (Borough boundary changes took place but the number of seats remained the same)
- 1988 Chorley Borough Council election
- 1990 Chorley Borough Council election
- 1991 Chorley Borough Council election
- 1992 Chorley Borough Council election
- 1994 Chorley Borough Council election (Borough boundary changes took place but the number of seats remained the same)
- 1995 Chorley Borough Council election
- 1998 Chorley Borough Council election
- 1999 Chorley Borough Council election
- 2000 Chorley Borough Council election
- 2002 Chorley Borough Council election (New ward boundaries)
- 2003 Chorley Borough Council election
- 2004 Chorley Borough Council election
- 2006 Chorley Borough Council election
- 2007 Chorley Borough Council election
- 2008 Chorley Borough Council election
- 2010 Chorley Borough Council election
- 2011 Chorley Borough Council election
- 2012 Chorley Borough Council election
- 2014 Chorley Borough Council election
- 2015 Chorley Borough Council election
- 2016 Chorley Borough Council election
- 2018 Chorley Borough Council election
- 2019 Chorley Borough Council election
- 2021 Chorley Borough Council election (New ward boundaries)
- 2022 Chorley Borough Council election
- 2023 Chorley Borough Council election
- 2024 Chorley Borough Council election

== Borough result maps ==
2002 results map

2003 results map

2004 results map

2006 results map

2007 results map

2008 results map

2010 results map

2011 results map

2012 results map

2014 results map

2015 results map

2016 results map

2018 results map

2019 results map

2021 results map

2022 results map

2023 results map

2024 results map

2026 results map

== By-election results ==
=== 1994-1998 ===
Charnock Richard by-election 15 May 1997
Party	Candidate	Votes	%	±%
Conservative		467	62.8	
Labour		233	31.3	
Liberal Democrats		44	5.9	
Majority		134	31.5	
Turnout		744	49.1	
Conservative hold		Swing		

=== 2002-2006 ===
Clayton-le-Woods and Whittle-le-Woods By-Election 5 May 2005
Party	Candidate	Votes	%	±%
Conservative	Gregory Morgan	1,395	41.5	−9.9
Labour		1,105	32.8	+9.8
Liberal Democrats		865	25.7	+0.1
Majority		290	8.7	
Turnout		3,365		
Conservative hold		Swing		

=== 2006-2010 ===
Wheelton and Withnell By-Election 4 June 2009
Party	Candidate	Votes	%	±%
Labour	Christopher France	841	49.2	+4.3
Conservative	Eleanor Smith	634	37.1	−18.0
UKIP	Nick Hogan	179	10.5	+10.5
New Party	Colin Denby	56	3.3	+3.3
Majority		207	12.1	
Turnout		1,710		
Labour gain from Conservative		Swing		

=== 2014-2018 ===
Euxton North By-Election 20 October 2015
Party	Candidate	Votes	%	±%
Labour	Tommy Gray	697	57.3	+12.7
Conservative	Alan Platt	443	36.4	−0.4
UKIP	Christopher Suart	76	6.3	−12.3
Majority		254	20.9	
Turnout		1,216		
Labour hold		Swing		

=== 2018-2022 ===
Eccleston and Mawdesley By-Election 4 July 2019
Party	Candidate	Votes	%	±%
Conservative	Val Caunce	1,050	63.2	+9.0
Labour	Martin Fisher	611	36.8	+3.8
Majority		439	26.4	
Turnout		1,661		
Conservative hold		Swing		

=== 2022-2026 ===
Croston, Mawdesley and Euxton South By-Election 14 September 2023
Party	Candidate	Votes	%	±%
Conservative	Debra Platt	878	47.9	−3.6
Labour	Ian Cardwell	710	38.8	+3.0
Liberal Democrats	Rowan Powers	244	13.3	+6.3
Majority		168	9.2	
Turnout		1,832		
Conservative hold		Swing		

Chorley East By-Election 1 May 2025
Party	Candidate	Votes	%	±%
Reform	Martin Topp	672	40.1	+40.1
Labour	Ian Cardwell	619	36.9	−26.4
Conservative	Sue Baines	160	9.5	−7.8
Green	Anne Calderbank	121	7.2	−2.5
TUSC	Aamir Khansaheb	91	5.4	−4.4
Independent	Moira Crawford	13	0.8	+0.8
Majority		53	3.2	
Turnout		1,676		
Reform gain from Labour		Swing		

Buckshaw and Whittle By-Election 26 June 2025
Party	Candidate	Votes	%	±%
Conservative	Aidy Riggott	576	35.5	−6.3
Reform	Jonathan Close	530	32.7	+32.7
Labour	Gillian Sharples	412	25.4	−22.5
Green	Amy Coxley	103	6.4	−3.9
Majority		46	2.8	
Turnout		1,621		
Conservative hold		Swing		
