= 2024 Chorley Borough Council election =

2024 English local election

← 2023	2 May 2024	2026 →

14 out of 42 seats to Chorley Borough Council 22 seats needed for a majority

	First party	Second party
Leader	Alistair Bradley	Alan Cullens
Party	Labour	Conservative
Leader's seat	Chorley South East and Heath Charnock	Clayton East, Brindle and Hoghton (lost)
Seats before	37	5
Seats after	39	3
Seat change	▲2	▼2
- The winner of each seat in the 2024 Chorley Borough Council election
Leader before election
Alistair Bradley
Labour
Leader after election
Alistair Bradley
Labour

The 2024 Chorley Borough Council election was held on 2 May 2024 to elect councillors to Chorley Council in Lancashire, England. This was on the same day as other local elections across England.

A third of the council was up for election. Ahead of the election the council was under Labour control. Labour won 13 of the 14 seats available, increasing their majority on the council and in the process unseated the council's Conservatives leader. The Conservatives only retained one of the three seats they were defending.

== Results summary ==
Chorley Borough Council's composition following the 2024 elections.

The results of the 2024 elections are summarised below.

2024 Chorley Borough Council election
Party	This election			Full council			This election		
Party	Seats	Net	Seats %	Other	Total	Total %	Votes	Votes %	+/−
Labour	13	▲2	92.9	26	39	92.9	15,832	60.5	+1.1
Conservative	1	▼2	7.14	2	3	7.1	7,012	26.8	―2.7
Green	0	Steady	0.0	0	0	0.0	2,617	10.0	+1.1
Liberal Democrats	0	Steady	0.0	0	0	0.0	406	1.6	―0.4
TUSC	0	Steady	0.0	0	0	0.0	322	1.2	+0.9

== Ward results ==
=== Adlington and Anderton ===
Adlington and Anderton
Party	Candidate	Votes	%	±%
Labour	Kim Snape	1,392	72.1	+1.5
Conservative	Neil Gardiner Baglow	404	20.9	―1.6
Green	Sally Felton	134	6.9	±0.0
Majority		988	51.2	
Turnout		1,930	32.1	
Labour hold		Swing	▲1.6	

=== Buckshaw and Whittle ===
Buckshaw and Whittle
Party	Candidate	Votes	%	±%
Labour	Russell Charles Green	995	47.9	―11.8
Conservative	Aidy Riggott	870	41.8	+9.5
Green	Rachel Smith	214	10.3	+2.3
Majority		125	6.0	
Turnout		2,079	29.2	
Labour gain from Conservative		Swing	▼10.6	

=== Chorley East ===
Chorley East
Party	Candidate	Votes	%	±%
Labour	Hasina Khan	935	63.3	―19.3
Conservative	Mark Grandi	255	17.3	―0.1
TUSC	Aamir Khansaheb	145	9.8	N/A
Green	Catherine Rossall―Hunter	143	9.7	N/A
Majority		680	46.0	
Turnout		1,478	25.0	
Labour hold		Swing	▼9.6	

=== Chorley North and Astley ===
Chorley North and Astley
Party	Candidate	Votes	%	±%
Labour	Adrian Lowe	1,002	60.7	+2.0
Conservative	Ryan Grogan	426	25.8	―4.1
Green	Jon Royle	173	10.5	―0.9
TUSC	Tahir Khansaheb	50	3.0	N/A
Majority		576	34.9	
Turnout		1,651	27.8	
Labour hold		Swing	▲3.6	

=== Chorley North East ===
Chorley North East
Party	Candidate	Votes	%	±%
Labour	Mary Margaret France	1,451	70.7	+1.0
Conservative	Ian Gregory Morgan	444	21.6	―1.2
Green	Simon Cash	156	7.6	+0.3
Majority		1,007	49.1	
Turnout		2,051	37.0	
Labour hold		Swing	▲1.1	

=== Chorley North West ===
Chorley North West
Party	Candidate	Votes	%	±%
Labour	Aaron Beaver	1,340	64.1	―1.4
Conservative	Peter Malpas	486	23.2	―2.6
Green	Mark Worsley Tebbutt	214	10.2	+0.4
TUSC	Arif Khansaheb	51	2.4	N/A
Majority		864	39.7	
Turnout		2,091	35.4	
Labour hold		Swing	▲0.6	

=== Chorley South East and Heath Charnock ===
Chorley South East and Heath Charnock
Party	Candidate	Votes	%	±%
Labour	Alistair Ward Bradley	1,173	62.6	+1.6
Conservative	Sandra Mercer	467	25.4	―0.7
Green	Jane Weston	158	8.4	+0.8
TUSC	Jenny Hurley	76	4.1	―1.2
Majority		706	37.7	
Turnout		1,874	27.6	
Labour hold		Swing	▲1.2	

=== Chorley South West ===
Chorley South West
Party	Candidate	Votes	%	±%
Labour	Katie Wilkie	935	56.8	+5.4
Green	Olga Cash	562	34.1	―3.4
Conservative	Peter Clifford Davenport	150	9.1	±0.0
Majority		373	22.6	
Turnout		1,647	28.4	
Labour hold		Swing	▲4.4	

=== Clayton East, Brindle and Hoghton ===
Clayton East, Brindle and Hoghton
Party	Candidate	Votes	%	±%
Labour	Irene Evelyn Amahwe	949	48.7	―3.6
Conservative	Alan Cullens	723	37.1	+1.5
Liberal Democrats	Gail Patricia Ormston	148	7.6	―0.8
Green	Pauline Summers	128	6.6	+0.9
Majority		226	11.6	
Turnout		1,948	29.0	
Labour gain from Conservative		Swing	▼2.5	

=== Clayton West and Cuerden ===
Clayton West and Cuerden
Party	Candidate	Votes	%	±%
Labour	Mark Edward Clifford	1,369	63.1	+6.4
Conservative	Samuel Andrew Chapman	541	24.9	―5.1
Green	Clare Elizabeth Hales	167	7.7	+2.8
Liberal Democrats	Stephen John Fenn	93	4.3	―4.1
Majority		828	38.2	
Turnout		2,170	32.5	
Labour hold		Swing	▲5.8	

=== Coppull ===
Coppull
Party	Candidate	Votes	%	±%
Labour	Alex Martin Hilton	1,022	71.1	―0.3
Conservative	Conor Dawson	299	20.8	+0.5
Green	Anne Calderbank	116	8.1	―0.1
Majority		723	50.3	
Turnout		1,437	23.4	
Labour hold		Swing	▼0.4	

=== Croston, Mawdesley and Euxton South ===
Croston, Mawdesley and Euxton South
Party	Candidate	Votes	%	±%
Conservative	Debra Platt	976	44.9	―3.0
Labour	Caroline Elizabeth Turner	897	41.3	+2.5
Green	John Clare	194	8.9	N/A
Liberal Democrats	Mark Robert Frost	105	4.8	―8.5
Majority		79	3.6	
Turnout		2,172	34.9	
Conservative hold		Swing	▼2.3	

=== Eccleston, Heskin and Charnock Richard ===
Eccleston, Heskin and Charnock Richard
Party	Candidate	Votes	%	±%
Labour	Alan Whittaker	1,117	63.1	+12.3
Conservative	Steve Bland	504	28.4	―10.4
Green	Sef Churchill	88	5.0	―0.2
Liberal Democrats	Rown Patrick Power	60	3.4	―1.7
Majority		613	34.7	
Turnout		1,769	32.5	
Labour hold		Swing	▲11.4	

=== Euxton ===
Euxton
Party	Candidate	Votes	%	±%
Labour	Danny Gee	1,255	66.3	+11.4
Conservative	Christine Turner	467	24.7	―12.8
Green	Madeleine Houghton	170	9.0	+1.5
Majority		788	41.6	
Turnout		1,892	32.1	
Labour hold		Swing	▲12.1	

== By-elections ==
=== Buckshaw & Whittle ===
Buckshaw & Whittle by-election: 26 June 2025
Party	Candidate	Votes	%	±%
Conservative	Aidy Riggott	576	35.5	–6.3
Reform UK	Jonathan Close	530	32.7	N/A
Labour	Gillian Sharples	412	25.4	–22.5
Green	Amy Coxley	103	6.4	–3.9
Majority		46	2.8	N/A
Turnout		1,621	22.4	–6.8
Conservative gain from Labour				

== See also ==
- Chorley Borough Council elections
