= 2022 Chorley Borough Council election =

2022 UK local government election

← 2021	5 May 2022	2023 →

14 out of 42 seats to Chorley Borough Council 22 seats needed for a majority
	First party	Second party
Leader	Alistair Bradley	Martin Boardman
Party	Labour	Conservative
Seats before	29	13
Seats after	32	10
Seat change	▲3	▼3
Popular vote	16,708	9,804
Percentage	55.7%	32.5%
Swing	▲6.4%	▼7.0%
- The winner of each seat in the 2022 Chorley Borough Council election
Leader before election
Alistair Bradley
Labour
Leader after election
Alistair Bradley
Labour

Council elections for the Borough of Chorley were held on 5 May 2022 as part of the 2022 United Kingdom local elections.

A third of the council was up for election. The result was a hold for the ruling Labour group.

== Results summary ==
The results of the 2022 elections are summarised below.

2022 Chorley Borough Council election
Party	This election			Full council			This election		
Party	Seats	Net	Seats %	Other	Total	Total %	Votes	Votes %	+/−
Labour	13	▲3	92.9	19	32	76.2	16,758	55.7	+6.4
Conservative	1	▼3	7.14	9	10	23.8	9,804	32.5	―7.0
Green	0	Steady	0.0	0	0	0.0	2,735	9.1	+2.2
Liberal Democrats	0	Steady	0.0	0	0	0.0	702	2.3	+0.2
TUSC	0	Steady	0.0	0	0	0.0	85	0.3	+0.1

== Ward results ==
=== Adlington and Anderton ===
Adlington and Anderton
Party	Candidate	Votes	%	±%
Labour	June Molyneaux	1,339	62.0	+7.5
Conservative	Neil Gardiner Baglow	699	32.4	+2.2
Green	Jon Royle	121	5.6	―3.4
Majority		640	29.6	
Turnout		2,159	36.7	
Labour hold		Swing	▲2.7	

=== Buckshaw and Whittle ===
Buckshaw and Whittle
Party	Candidate	Votes	%	±%
Labour	Dedrah Cecillia Moss	1,036	54.3	+21.2
Conservative	Christine Turner	715	37.5	―3.6
Green	Rachel Smith	156	8.2	―2.0
Majority		321	24.8	
Turnout		1,907	27.7	
Labour gain from Conservative		Swing	▲12.4	

=== Chorley East ===
Chorley East
Party	Candidate	Votes	%	±%
Labour	Zara Khan	1,153	70.6	+7.9
Conservative	Susan Margaret Morris	304	18.6	―5.3
Green	Emma Jayne Kilburn	175	10.7	―2.6
Majority		849	52.0	
Turnout		1,632	27.3	
Labour hold		Swing	▲6.6	

=== Chorley North and Astley ===
Chorley North and Astley
Party	Candidate	Votes	%	±%
Labour	Alistair William Morwood	1,159	58.6	+16.1
Conservative	Oliver Luke Knights	606	30.6	+1.0
Green	Katherine Jane Becker	213	10.8	―2.6
Majority		553	28.0	
Turnout		1,978	33.8	
Labour hold		Swing	▲7.6	

=== Chorley North East ===
Chorley North East
Party	Candidate	Votes	%	±%
Labour	Jenny Whiffen	1,516	61.1	+8.2
Conservative	Ryan Grogan	783	31.6	―4.6
Green	Daisy Skye Royle	181	7.3	―3.5
Majority		733	29.5	
Turnout		2,480	45.6	
Labour hold		Swing	▲6.4	

=== Chorley North West ===
Chorley North West
Party	Candidate	Votes	%	±%
Labour	Matthew John Lynch	1,366	59.0	+2.8
Conservative	Peter Malpas	738	31.9	+1.4
Green	Mark Worsley Tebbutt	211	9.1	―4.2
Majority		628	27.1	
Turnout		2,315	39.6	
Labour hold		Swing	▲0.7	

=== Chorley South East and Heath Charnock ===
Chorley South East and Heath Charnock
Party	Candidate	Votes	%	±%
Labour	Samir Kahn	1,169	58.2	+5.4
Conservative	Sandra Mercer	591	29.4	―2.6
Green	Jane Elizabeth Weston	164	8.2	―1.0
TUSC	Jenny Hurley	85	4.2	―1.7
Majority		578	28.8	
Turnout		2,009	30.0	
Labour hold		Swing	▲4.0	

=== Chorley South West ===
Chorley South West
Party	Candidate	Votes	%	±%
Labour	Terry Howarth	858	51.5	―4.0
Green	Andy Hunter-Rossall	547	32.8	+10.6
Conservative	Marie Gray	262	15.7	―6.6
Majority		311	18.7	
Turnout		1,667	29.3	
Labour hold		Swing	▼7.3	

=== Clayton East, Brindle and Hoghton ===
Clayton East, Brindle and Hoghton
Party	Candidate	Votes	%	±%
Labour	Michelle Le Marinel	1,035	46.5	+17.4
Conservative	Gregory Ian Morgan	989	44.4	+11.7
Green	Olga Maria Gomez-Cash	203	9.1	―1.0
Majority		46	2.1	
Turnout		2,227	33.1	
Labour gain from Conservative		Swing	▲2.9	

=== Clayton West and Cuerden ===
Clayton West and Cuerden
Party	Candidate	Votes	%	±%
Labour	Neville Grant Whitman	1,499	58.9	+13.6
Conservative	William Simmance	802	31.5	―3.6
Green	Clare Elizabeth Hales	243	9.6	―2.6
Majority		697	27.4	
Turnout		2,544	38.7	
Labour gain from Conservative		Swing	▲8.6	

=== Coppull ===
Coppull
Party	Candidate	Votes	%	±%
Labour	Ryan Towers	1,325	70.1	+9.3
Conservative	Andi Mac	458	24.2	―6.3
Green	Anne Francis Calderbank	107	5.7	―2.9
Majority		867	45.9	
Turnout		1,890	31.6	
Labour hold		Swing	▲7.8	

=== Croston, Mawdesley and Euxton South ===
Croston, Mawdesley and Euxton South
Party	Candidate	Votes	%	±%
Conservative	Alan Platt	1,200	46.3	―3.9
Labour	Caroline Elizabeth Turner	660	25.5	+0.1
Liberal Democrats	John Patrick Wright	636	24.6	+11.1
Green	Robert Stewart Wade	93	3.6	―7.4
Majority		540	20.8	
Turnout		2,589	41.9	
Conservative hold		Swing	▼2.0	

=== Eccleston, Heskin and Charnock Richard ===
Eccleston, Heskin and Charnock Richard
Party	Candidate	Votes	%	±%
Labour	Arjun Singh	1,154	51.5	+3.9
Conservative	John Derek Dalton	917	40.9	+6.3
Green	Sally Felton	104	4.6	―5.2
Liberal Democrats	Mark Robert Frost	66	2.9	―4.9
Majority		237	10.6	
Turnout		2,241	39.9	
Labour gain from Conservative		Swing	▼1.2	

=== Euxton ===
Euxton
Party	Candidate	Votes	%	±%
Labour	Tommy Gray	1,429	62.0	+18.1
Conservative	Rosie Russell	740	32.1	―11.2
Green	Richard Taylor Kilburn	135	5.9	―2.0
Majority		689	29.9	
Turnout		2,304	39.2	
Labour hold		Swing	▲14.7	
