= 2023 Chorley Borough Council election =

2023 English local election

← 2022	4 May 2023	2024 →

14 out of 42 seats to Chorley Borough Council 22 seats needed for a majority

	First party	Second party	Third party
Leader	Alistair Bradley	Alan Cullens	n/a
Party	Labour	Conservative	Independent
Seats before	31	10	1 (Note: The one independent councillor prior to the election, James Nevett, had been elected as a Labour councillor in 2021, but resigned from the party in November 2022.)
Seats after	37	5	0
Seat change	▲6	▼5	▼1
- The winner of each seat in the 2023 Chorley Borough Council election
Leader before election
Alistair Bradley
Labour
Leader after election
Alistair Bradley
Labour

The 2023 Chorley Borough Council election was held on 4 May 2023 to elect councillors to Chorley Council in Lancashire, England. This was on the same day as other local elections across England.

A third of the council was up for election. Ahead of the election the council was under Labour control. Labour won 13 of the 14 seats available, increasing their majority on the council. The Conservatives only retained one of the six seats they were defending.

== Results summary ==
The overall results were as follows:

2023 Chorley Borough Council election
Party	This election			Full council			This election		
Party	Seats	Net	Seats %	Other	Total	Total %	Votes	Votes %	+/−
Labour	13	▲6	92.9	24	37	88.1	16,480	59.26	+3.5
Conservative	1	▼5	7.1	4	5	11.9	8,193	29.46	-3.0
Green	0	Steady	0	0	0	0.0	2,480	8.92	-0.1
Liberal Democrats	0	Steady	0	0	0	0.0	551	1.98	-0.3
TUSC	0	Steady	0	0	0	0.0	104	0.37	Steady
Independent	0	▼1	0	0	0	0.0	0	0.0	Steady

== Ward results ==
=== Adlington and Anderton ===
Adlington and Anderton
Party	Candidate	Votes	%	±%
Labour	Peter Francis Wilson	1,348	70.6	+8.6
Conservative	Neil Gardiner Baglow	430	22.5	―9.9
Green	Catherine Hunter-Russell	132	6.9	+1.3
Majority		918	48.1	
Turnout		1,910		
Labour hold		Swing	▲9.2	

=== Buckshaw and Whittle ===
Buckshaw and Whittle
Party	Candidate	Votes	%	±%
Labour	Samantha Jayne Martin	1,205	59.7	+5.4
Conservative	Gregory Ian Morgan	652	32.3	―5.2
Green	Rachel Smith	161	8.0	―0.2
Majority		553	27.4	
Turnout		2,018		
Labour gain from Conservative		Swing	▲5.3	

=== Chorley East ===
Chorley East
Party	Candidate	Votes	%	±%
Labour	Chris Snow	1,175	82.6	+12.0
Conservative	Mark Grandi	248	17.4	―1.2
Majority		927	65.1	
Turnout		1,423		
Labour gain from Independent		Swing	▲6.6	

=== Chorley North and Astley ===
Chorley North and Astley
Party	Candidate	Votes	%	±%
Labour	Jean Margaret Sherwood	1,026	58.7	+0.1
Conservative	Oliver Luke Knights	522	29.9	―0.7
Green	Jon Royle	199	11.4	+0.6
Majority		504	28.8	
Turnout		1,747		
Labour hold		Swing	▲0.4	

=== Chorley North East ===
Chorley North East
Party	Candidate	Votes	%	±%
Labour	Gordon France	1,554	69.7	+8.6
Conservative	Charles Russell Hargreaves	509	22.8	―8.8
Green	Simon Cash	162	7.3	±0.0
Majority		1,045	47.0	
Turnout		2,225		
Labour hold		Swing	▲8.7	

=== Chorley North West ===
Chorley North West
Party	Candidate	Votes	%	±%
Labour	Sarah Elizabeth Jane Ainsworth	1,425	65.5	+6.5
Conservative	Peter Malpas	561	25.8	―6.1
Green	Mark Tebbutt	191	8.8	―0.3
Majority		864	39.7	
Turnout		2,177		
Labour hold		Swing	▲6.3	

=== Chorley South East and Heath Charnock ===
Chorley South East and Heath Charnock
Party	Candidate	Votes	%	±%
Labour	Beverly Murray	1,203	61.0	+2.8
Conservative	Conner Dawson	514	26.1	―3.3
Green	Jane Weston	150	7.6	―0.6
TUSC	Jenny Hurley	104	5.3	+1.1
Majority		689	35.0	
Turnout		1,971		
Labour hold		Swing	▲3.0	

=== Chorley South West ===
Chorley South West
Party	Candidate	Votes	%	±%
Labour	Roy Lees	857	51.4	―0.1
Green	Andy Hunter-Rossall	625	37.5	+4.7
Conservative	Peter Clifford Davenport	152	9.1	―6.6
Liberal Democrats	Stephen John Fenn	33	2.0	N/A
Majority		232	13.9	
Turnout		1,667		
Labour hold		Swing	▼2.4	

=== Clayton East, Brindle and Hoghton ===
Clayton East, Brindle and Hoghton
Party	Candidate	Votes	%	±%
Labour	Pauline Barbara Mary Mcgovern	1,065	52.3	+5.8
Conservative	Samuel Andrew Chapman	724	35.6	―8.8
Liberal Democrats	Gail Patricia Ormston	129	6.3	N/A
Green	Olga Gomez-Cash	117	5.7	―3.4
Majority		341	16.8	
Turnout		2,035		
Labour gain from Conservative		Swing	▲7.3	

=== Clayton West and Cuerden ===
Clayton West and Cuerden
Party	Candidate	Votes	%	±%
Labour	Michelle Amanda Brown	1,369	56.7	―2.2
Conservative	Magdalene Margaret Cullens	723	30.0	―1.5
Green	Clare Hales	202	8.4	−1.2
Liberal Democrats	Glenda Charlesworth	119	4.9	N/A
Majority		646	26.8	
Turnout		2,413		
Labour gain from Conservative		Swing		

=== Coppull ===
Coppull
Party	Candidate	Votes	%	±%
Labour	Julia Louise Berry	1,161	71.4	+1.3
Conservative	Christine Turner	330	20.3	―3.9
Green	Anne Calderbank	134	8.2	+2.5
Majority		831	51.1	
Turnout		1,625		
Labour hold		Swing	▲3.2	

=== Croston, Mawdesley and Euxton South ===
Croston, Mawdesley and Euxton South
Party	Candidate	Votes	%	±%
Conservative	Craig G. Southern	1,139	50.4	+4.1
Labour	Caroline Elizabeth Turner	828	36.6	+11.1
Liberal Democrats	Rowan Patrick Power	161	7.1	―17.5
Green	Robert Stewart Wade	134	5.9	+2.3
Majority		311	13.7	
Turnout		2,262		
Conservative hold		Swing	▼1.4	

=== Eccleston, Heskin and Charnock Richard ===
Eccleston, Heskin and Charnock Richard
Party	Candidate	Votes	%	±%
Labour	Christine Anne Heydon	1,082	50.8	―0.7
Conservative	Harold Heaton	827	38.8	―2.1
Green	Sally Felton	111	5.2	+0.6
Liberal Democrats	Mark Robert Frost	109	5.1	+2.2
Majority		255	12.0	
Turnout		2,129		
Labour gain from Conservative		Swing		

=== Euxton ===
Euxton
Party	Candidate	Votes	%	±%
Labour	Joan Williamson	1,182	54.9	―7.1
Conservative	Debra Platt	808	37.5	+5.4
Green	Pauline Margaret Summers	162	7.5	+1.6
Majority		374	17.4	
Turnout		2,152		
Labour gain from Conservative		Swing	▼8.9	

== By-elections ==
=== Croston, Mawdesley and Euxton South ===
Croston, Mawdesley and Euxton South by-election, 14 September 2023
Party	Candidate	Votes	%	±%
Conservative	Debra Platt	878	47.9	―2.5
Labour	Ian Cardwell	710	38.8	+2.2
Liberal Democrats	Rowan Patrick Power	244	13.3	+6.2
Majority		168	9.1	
Turnout		1,832	29.6	
Conservative hold		Swing	▼2.4	

The Croston, Mawdesley and Euxton South by-election was triggered by the death of Conservative councillor Keith Iddon.
