= 2003 Chorley Borough Council election =

2003 UK local government election

Elections to Chorley Borough Council were held on 1 May 2003. One third of the council was up for election and the council stayed under no overall control.

After the election, the composition of the council was:

Party	Seats	±
Labour	22	Steady
Conservative	18	▲2
Liberal Democrat	4	▼2
Independent	3	Steady

== Election result ==
Chorley local election result 2003
Party	Seats	Gains	Losses	Net gain/loss	Seats %	Votes %	Votes	+/−
Conservative	9	2	0	▲2	60.0	38.9	12,639	+4.9
Labour	6	1	1	Steady	40.0	43.1	13,997	−2.0
Liberal Democrats	0	0	2	▼2	0.0	15.8	5,143	+2.6
Independent	0	0	0	Steady	0.0	2.2	721	−4.8

== Results Map ==
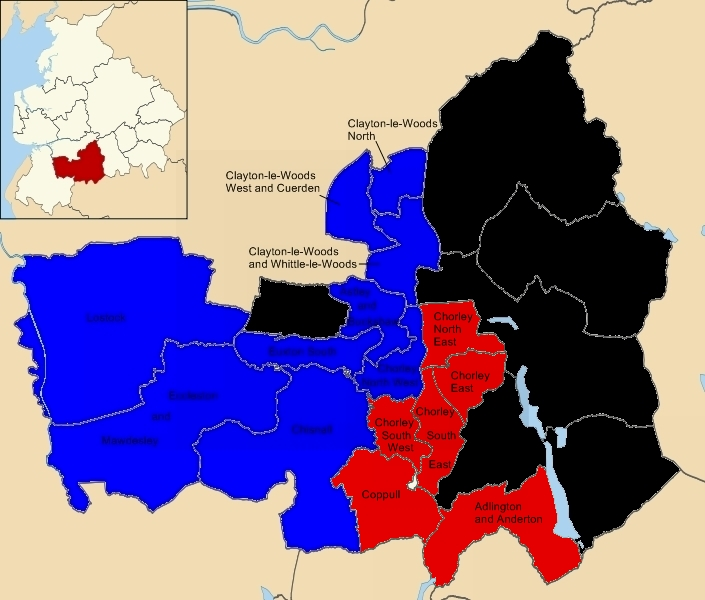
2003 results

== Ward results ==
=== Adlington and Anderton ward ===
Adlington and Anderton
Party	Candidate	Votes	%	±%
Labour	✓ June Molyneux	1,281	44.0	
Conservative	Lois Birtwistle	1,104	37.9	
Liberal Democrats	Philip William Pilling	528	18.1	
Majority		177	6.1	
Turnout		2,913	53.0	
Labour hold		Swing		

=== Astley and Buckshaw ward ===
Astley and Buckshaw
Party	Candidate	Votes	%	±%
Conservative	✓ Mark Perks	887	58.2	
Labour	David Lloyd	488	32.0	
Liberal Democrats	Raymond Ormston	149	9.8	
Majority		399	26.2	
Turnout		1,524	55.0	
Conservative hold		Swing		

=== Chisnall ===
Chisnall
Party	Candidate	Votes	%	±%
Conservative	✓ Edward Smith	620	35.82	
Labour	Edward Forshaw	529	30.56	
Independent	Alan Cornwell	299	17.27	
Liberal Democrats	Glyn Jones	283	16.35	
Majority		91	5.26	
Turnout		1,731	54.0	
Conservative hold		Swing		

=== Chorley East ===
Chorley East
Party	Candidate	Votes	%	±%
Labour	✓ Terence Brown	1,282	59.79	
Conservative	Elsie Perks	440	20.52	
Independent	Melville Coombes	422	19.68	
Majority		860	40.11	
Turnout		2,144	44.0	
Labour hold		Swing		

=== Chorley North East ===
Chorley North East
Party	Candidate	Votes	%	±%
Labour	✓ Marion Lowe	1,264	53.2	
Conservative	Shaun Smith	785	33.0	
Liberal Democrats	Eileen Smith	327	13.8	
Majority		479	20.2	
Turnout		2,376	46.0	
Labour hold		Swing		

=== Chorley North West ===
Chorley North West
Party	Candidate	Votes	%	±%
Conservative	✓ Peter Malpas	1,254	42.0	
Labour	Robert Crabtree	1,126	37.7	
Liberal Democrats	Linda Norman	605	20.3	
Majority		128	4.3	
Turnout		2,985	59.0	
Conservative gain from Labour		Swing		

=== Chorley South East ===
Chorley South East
Party	Candidate	Votes	%	±%
Labour	✓ Christopher Michael Snow	1,281	51.3	
Conservative	Sheila Marsden	863	34.6	
Liberal Democrats	David Porter	352	14.1	
Majority		418	16.7	
Turnout		2,496	50.0	
Labour hold		Swing		

=== Chorley South West ===
Chorley South West
Party	Candidate	Votes	%	±%
Labour	✓ John Wilson	1,150	58.2	
Conservative	Lawrence Carter	487	24.6	
Liberal Democrats	Ms. Jean Mellor	340	17.2	
Majority		663	33.5	
Turnout		1,977	42.0	
Labour hold		Swing		

=== Clayton le Woods and Whittle-le-Woods ward ===
Clayton le Woods and Whittle-le-Woods
Party	Candidate	Votes	%	±%
Conservative	✓ Nigel Baxter	1,170	47.9	
Labour	Sharon Gray	640	26.2	
Liberal Democrats	Glenda Charlesworth	634	25.9	
Majority		530	21.7	
Turnout		2,444	49.0	
Conservative hold		Swing		

=== Clayton le Woods North ward ===
Clayton le Woods North
Party	Candidate	Votes	%	±%
Conservative	✓ Roger Livesey	715	36.8	
Liberal Democrats	William Mellor	699	36.0	
Labour	Darren Woodruff	529	27.2	
Majority		16	0.8	
Turnout		1,943	38.0	
Conservative gain from Liberal Democrats		Swing		

=== Clayton le Woods West and Cuerden ===
Clayton le Woods West and Cuerden
Party	Candidate	Votes	%	±%
Conservative	✓ Thomas Bedford	731	42.0	
Labour	Ted Murphy	656	37.7	
Liberal Democrats	Gail Ormston	353	20.3	
Majority		75	4.3	
Turnout		1,740	51.0	
Conservative hold		Swing		

=== Coppull ===
Coppull
Party	Candidate	Votes	%	±%
Labour	✓ Andrew Birchall	939	45.6	
Liberal Democrats	Patricia Cuerden	873	42.4	
Conservative	Dorothy Livesey	246	12.0	
Majority		66	3.2	
Turnout		2,058	44.0	
Labour gain from Liberal Democrats		Swing		

=== Eccleston and Mawdesley ward ===
Eccleston and Mawdesley
Party	Candidate	Votes	%	±%
Conservative	✓ Francis Culshaw	1,399	51.4	
Labour	Thomas Titherington	1,320	48.5	
Majority		79	2.9	
Turnout		2,719	55.0	
Conservative hold		Swing		

=== Euxton South ward ===
Euxton South
Party	Candidate	Votes	%	±%
Conservative	✓ Peter Golsworthy	1,039	57.2	
Labour	Mary Gray	778	42.8	
Majority		261	14.4	
Turnout		1,817	55.0	
Conservative hold		Swing		

=== Lostock ===
Lostock
Party	Candidate	Votes	%	±%
Conservative	✓ Doreen Dickinson	899	55.1	
Labour	David Massam	734	44.9	
Majority		165	10.2	
Turnout		1,633	54.0	
Conservative hold		Swing		
