= 2007 Chorley Borough Council election =

2007 UK local government election

Elections to Chorley Borough Council were held on 3 May 2007. One third of the council was up for election and the Conservative Party retained overall control.

After the election, the composition of the council was:

Party	Seats	±
Conservative	26	▲1
Labour	15	▼2
Independent	3	Steady
Liberal Democrat	3	▲1

== Election result ==
Chorley local election result 2007
Party	Seats	Gains	Losses	Net gain/loss	Seats %	Votes %	Votes	+/−
Conservative	10	1	0	▲1	66.7	46.6	12,075	+1.6
Labour	4	0	2	▼2	26.7	38.2	9,889	+2.5
Liberal Democrats	1	1	0	▲1	6.7	8.3	2,154	−1.2
Independent	0	0	0	Steady	0.0	6.0	1,546	−2.7
New Party	0	0	0	Steady	0.0	1.0	251	+0.0

== Results Map ==
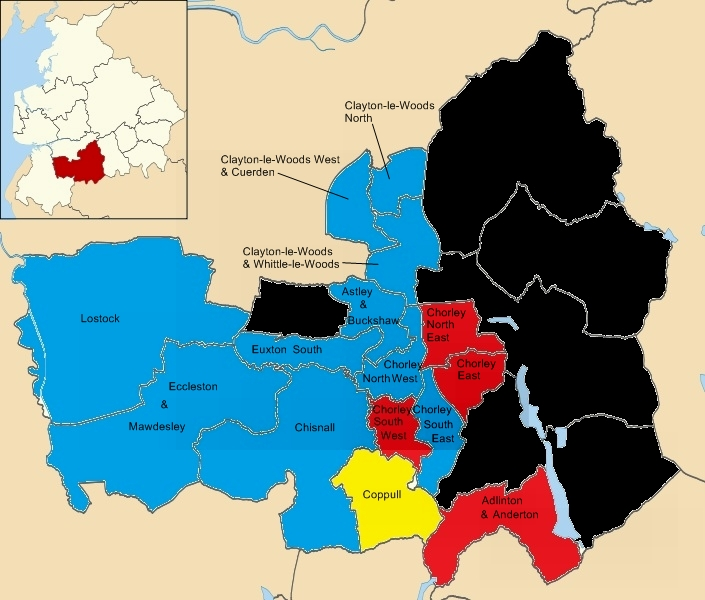
2007 results

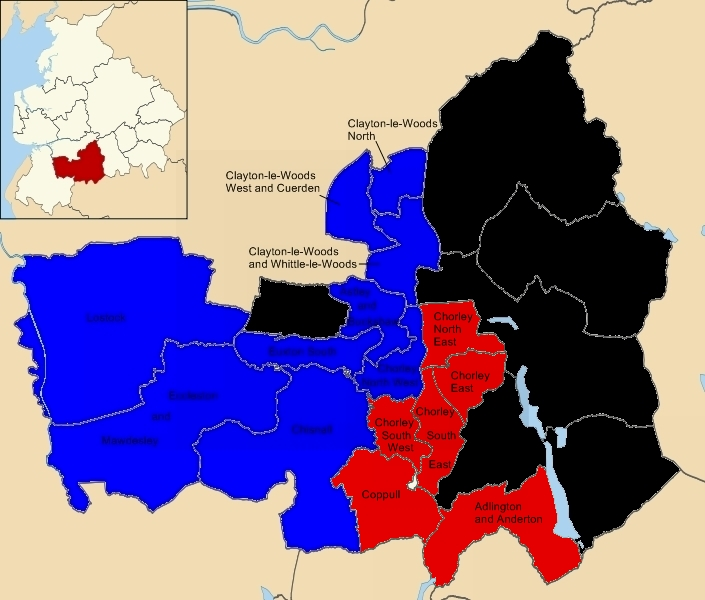
Previous 2003 results

== Ward results ==
=== Adlington and Anderton ward ===
Adlington and Anderton
Party	Candidate	Votes	%	±%
Labour	✓ June Molyneux	1,078	45.7	−11.4
Conservative	Adam Unsworth	863	36.6	+5.0
Liberal Democrats	Philip William Pilling	254	10.8	−0.5
Independent	Donald Greenhalgh	163	6.9	+6.9
Majority		215	9.1	
Turnout		2,358	42.0	
Labour hold		Swing	−8.2	

=== Astley and Buckshaw ward ===
Astley and Buckshaw
Party	Candidate	Votes	%	±%
Conservative	✓ Mark Perks	975	76.5	+10.1
Labour	David Christopher Lloyd	299	23.5	−10.1
Majority		676	53.1	
Turnout		1,274	44.7	
Conservative hold		Swing	+10.1	

=== Chisnall ward ===
Chisnall
Party	Candidate	Votes	%	±%
Conservative	✓ Edward Smith	755	57.8	+2.1
Labour	Edward Forshaw	551	42.2	+23.3
Majority		204	15.6	
Turnout		1,306	39.4	
Conservative hold		Swing	−12.7	

=== Chorley East ward ===
Chorley East
Party	Candidate	Votes	%	±%
Labour	✓ Terence Brown	963	60.5	+3.6
Conservative	Simon Parkinson	388	24.3	−18.8
Independent	Melville Coombes	242	15.2	+15.2
Majority		575	36.1	
Turnout		1,593	32.1	
Labour hold		Swing	+11.2	

=== Chorley North East ward ===
Chorley North East
Party	Candidate	Votes	%	±%
Labour Co-op	✓ Marion Lowe	858	50.3	−1.5
Conservative	Tony S. Acton	597	35.0	+4.1
New Party	Colin Denby	251	14.7	−2.6
Majority		261	15.3	
Turnout		1,706	34.0	
Labour Co-op hold		Swing	−2.8	

=== Chorley North West ward ===
Chorley North West
Party	Candidate	Votes	%	±%
Conservative	✓ Peter Malpas	1,349	56.1	+48.8
Labour Co-op	Alistair Ward Bradley	1,056	43.9	+36.4
Majority		293	12.2	
Turnout		2,405	48.7	
Conservative hold		Swing	+6.2	

=== Chorley South East ward ===
Chorley South East
Party	Candidate	Votes	%	±%
Conservative	✓ Mrs. Patrica Mary Houghton	855	44.5	+2.5
Labour	Christopher Michael Snow	834	43.4	+0.5
Liberal Democrats	David Porter	231	12.0	−3.0
Majority		21	1.1	
Turnout		1,920	39.2	
Conservative gain from Labour		Swing	+1.0	

=== Chorley South West ward ===
Chorley South West
Party	Candidate	Votes	%	±%
Labour Co-op	✓ Laura Jane Lennox	718	42.1	−5.3
Conservative	Eleanor Smith	548	32.1	+5.0
Independent	David J. Lucas	441	25.8	+25.8
Majority		170	10.0	
Turnout		1,707	30.2	
Labour Co-op hold		Swing	−5.2	

=== Clayton le Woods and Whittle-le-Woods ward ===
Clayton le Woods and Whittle-le-Woods
Party	Candidate	Votes	%	±%
Conservative	✓ Gregory I. Morgan	1,164	57.1	−7.7
Liberal Democrats	Glenda Charlesworth	447	22.0	+5.3
Labour	Jean E. Cronshaw	426	20.9	+2.4
Majority		717	35.2	
Turnout		2,037	37.3	
Conservative hold		Swing	−6.5	

=== Clayton le Woods North ward ===
Clayton le Woods North
Party	Candidate	Votes	%	±%
Conservative	✓ Michael J. Devaney	727	41.4	+1.8
Labour	Karen Teresa Martyniuk	634	36.1	+11.6
Liberal Democrats	Stephen John Fenn	396	22.5	−13.4
Majority		93	5.3	
Turnout		1,757	33.4	
Conservative hold		Swing	−4.9	

=== Clayton le Woods West and Cuerden ===
Clayton le Woods and Cuerden
Party	Candidate	Votes	%	±%
Conservative	✓ Judith A. Boothman	773	56.5	−3.6
Labour Co-op	David Edwin Rogerson	595	43.5	+3.6
Majority		178	13.0	
Turnout		1,368	40.0	
Conservative hold		Swing	−3.6	

=== Coppull ward ===
Coppull
Party	Candidate	Votes	%	±%
Liberal Democrats	✓ Nora Theresa Ball	826	51.3	−3.1
Labour	Susan Millar	524	32.6	+1.4
Conservative	Marlene Ann Bedford	259	16.1	+1.7
Majority		302	18.8	
Turnout		1,609	32.5	
Liberal Democrats gain from Labour		Swing	−2.3	

=== Eccleston and Mawdesley ward ===
Eccleston and Mawdesley
Party	Candidate	Votes	%	±%
Conservative	✓ Kevin Joyce	1,245	60.2	+6.1
Labour	Helen Margaret Bradley	824	39.8	−6.1
Majority		421	20.3	
Turnout		2,069	43.3	
Conservative hold		Swing	+6.1	

=== Euxton South ward ===
Euxton South
Party	Candidate	Votes	%	±%
Conservative	✓ Peter Goldsworthy	832	61.1	−6.7
Labour Co-op	Tommy Gray	529	38.9	+6.7
Majority		303	22.3	
Turnout		1,361	42.2	
Conservative hold		Swing	−6.7	

=== Lostock ward ===
Lostock
Party	Candidate	Votes	%	±%
Conservative	✓ Doreen Dickinson	745	51.6	+14.0
Independent	Tommy Wilson	700	48.4	+48.4
Majority		45	3.1	
Turnout		1,445	42.1	
Conservative hold		Swing	−17.2	
