= 1998 Chorley Borough Council election =

1998 UK local government election

Elections to Chorley Borough Council were held on 7 May 1998. One third of the council was up for election and the Labour party kept overall control of the council.

After the election, the composition of the council was:

Party	Seats	±
Labour	33	▼4
Liberal Democrat	7	▲1
Conservative	6	▲2
Independent	2	▲1

== Election result ==
Chorley local election result 1998
Party	Seats	Gains	Losses	Net gain/loss	Seats %	Votes %	Votes	+/−
Labour	9			▼4	50.0			
Conservative	5			▲2	27.8			
Liberal Democrats	3			▲1	16.7			
Independent	1			▲1	5.6			

== Ward results ==
=== Adlington ===
Adlington
Party	Candidate	Votes	%	±%
Labour	✓ Ms. Catherine Hoyle	828	61.6	
Labour	✓ Ms. June Molyneux	778		
Conservative	Ms. Suzan Jane Christopher	331	24.6	
Conservative	Robert Edward Tyler	225		
Liberal Democrats	Philip William Pilling	186	13.8	
Labour hold		Swing		

=== Anderton, Heath Charnock and Rivington ===
Anderton, Heath Charnock and Rivington
Party	Candidate	Votes	%	±%
Conservative	✓ Mary Patricia Case	452	46.5	
Labour	Michael Davies	432	44.5	
Liberal Democrats	David Porter	49	5.0	
Green	Matthew Hector Sims	38	3.9	
Majority		20	2.1	
Turnout		971	36.7	
Conservative gain from Labour		Swing		

=== Anglezarke, Heapey and Wheelton ===
Anglezarke, Heapey and Wheelton
Party	Candidate	Votes	%	±%
Conservative	✓ Marie Elizabeth Gray	267	45.4	
Liberal Democrats	Janet Ross-Mills	216	36.7	
Labour	Michael James Downes	105	17.9	
Majority		51	8.7	
Turnout		588	43.2	
Conservative hold		Swing		

=== Chorley East ===
Chorley East
Party	Candidate	Votes	%	±%
Labour	✓ Melville George Coombes	548	76.1	
Conservative	Erik Karl Baxendale	172	23.9	
Majority		376	52.2	
Turnout		720	17.7	
Labour hold		Swing		

=== Chorley North East ===
Chorley North East
Party	Candidate	Votes	%	±%
Labour	✓ Dennis Edgerley	611	68.9	
Conservative	Colin Nelson Goldsby	276	31.1	
Majority		335	37.8	
Turnout		887	21.2	
Labour hold		Swing		

=== Chorley North West ===
Chorley North West
Party	Candidate	Votes	%	±%
Conservative	✓ Robert John Collinson	927	49.7	
Labour	Laura Jane Lennox	710	38.0	
Liberal Democrats	Linda Norman	229	12.3	
Majority		217	11.6	
Turnout		1,866		
Labour hold		Swing		

=== Chorley South East ===
Chorley South East
Party	Candidate	Votes	%	±%
Labour	✓ Margaret May Lees	757	56.3	
Conservative	Mrs. Patrica Mary Haughton	587	43.7	
Majority		170	12.6	
Turnout		1,344	33.4	
Labour hold		Swing		

=== Chorley South West ward ===
Chorley South West
Party	Candidate	Votes	%	±%
Labour	✓ John Gerard Wilson	738	66.0	
Conservative	Peter Malpas	292	26.1	
Liberal Democrats	Ms. Mavis Porter	88	7.9	
Majority		446	39.9	
Turnout		1,118	21.4	
Labour hold		Swing	+3.5	

=== Chorley West ward ===
Chorley West
Party	Candidate	Votes	%	±%
Independent	✓ Ms. Joyce Snape	1,407	73.1	N/A
Labour	Terry Brown	430	22.3	−41.9
Conservative	Ms. Rosalie Margaret Goldsby	88	4.6	−16.4
Majority		977	50.8	
Turnout		1,925	45.7	
Independent gain from Labour		Swing	N/A	

=== Clayton-le-Woods East ===
Clayton-le-Woods East
Party	Candidate	Votes	%	±%
Liberal Democrats	✓ Simon Nicholas Jones	638	40.2	
Conservative	Alan Cullens	558	35.2	
Labour	Edward Anthony Murphy	391	24.6	
Majority		80	5.0	
Turnout		1,587	21.3	
Liberal Democrats hold		Swing		

=== Clayton-le-Woods West and Cuerden ===
Clayton-le-Woods West and Cuerden
Party	Candidate	Votes	%	±%
Labour	✓ Mrs. Ann Bland	527	40.4	
Conservative	John Philip Walker	418	32.0	
Liberal Democrats	Gail Patricia Ormston	361	27.6	
Majority		166	11.8	
Turnout		1,306	41.7	
Labour gain from Conservative		Swing		

=== Coppull North ward ===
Coppull North
Party	Candidate	Votes	%	±%
Liberal Democrats	✓ Ms. Stella Marie Walsh	583	58.2	+4.3
Labour	John Michael Murphy	379	37.9	−8.7
Conservative	Christopher Allan Perry	39	3.9	
Majority		159	15.9	
Turnout		1,001	35.0	
Liberal Democrats gain from Labour		Swing	−6.5	

=== Coppull South ward ===
Coppull South
Party	Candidate	Votes	%	±%
Liberal Democrats	✓ Kenneth William Ball	716	66.1	
Labour	Charles Edward Vaughan	299	27.6	−
Conservative	Allan McDonald	69	6.4	
Majority		417	38.5	
Turnout		1,084	36.1	
Liberal Democrats hold		Swing		

=== Eccleston and Heskin ===
Eccleston and Heskin
Party	Candidate	Votes	%	±%
Labour	✓ Alan Whittaker	1,255	74.3	
Conservative	Ms. Joan Constance Lucas	434	25.7	
Majority		821	48.6	
Turnout		1,689	39.7	
Labour hold		Swing		

=== Euxton North ===
Euxton North
Party	Candidate	Votes	%	±%
Labour	✓ Daniel Peter Gee	618	62.7	
Conservative	Peter Goldsworthy	310	31.5	
Liberal Democrats	Pauline Anne Sharp	57	5.8	
Majority		308	31.3	
Turnout		985	35.1	
Labour hold		Swing		

=== Mawdesley ===
Mawdesley
Party	Candidate	Votes	%	±%
Conservative	✓ Francis Culshaw	368	72.0	+16.9
Labour	Ms. Monica Mary Woodroffe	143	28.0	−16.9
Majority		225	44.0	
Turnout		511	34.5	
Conservative hold		Swing	+16.9	

=== Whittle-le-Woods ===
Whittle-le-Woods
Party	Candidate	Votes	%	±%
Conservative	✓ Eric James Bell	735	74.6	
Labour	William George Bailey	172	17.5	
Liberal Democrats	Stephen John Fenn	78	10.2	
Majority		563	57.2	
Turnout		985	31.4	
Conservative hold		Swing		
