= 1999 Chorley Borough Council election =

1999 UK local government election

Elections to Chorley Borough Council were held on 6 May 1999. One third of the council was up for election and the Labour party kept overall control of the council.

After the election, the composition of the council was:

Party	Seats	±
Labour	31	▼3
Conservative	9	▲3
Liberal Democrat	6	Steady
Independent	2	▼1

== Election result ==
Chorley local election result 1999
Party	Seats	Gains	Losses	Net gain/loss	Seats %	Votes %	Votes	+/−
Labour	10	0	3	▼3	62.5	48.3	8,722	
Conservative	3	3	0	▲3	18.8	31.5	5,693	
Liberal Democrats	3	1	1	Steady	18.8	19.1	3,446	
Independent Labour	0	0	0	Steady	0.0	0.8	145	N/A
Independent	0	0	1	▼1	0.0	0.3	54	

== Ward results ==
=== Adlington ===
Adlington
Party	Candidate	Votes	%	±%
Labour	✓ Florence Molyneux	698	71.9	
Liberal Democrats	Raymond Ormston	273	28.1	
Majority		425	43.8	
Turnout		971	22.5	
Labour hold		Swing		

=== Chorley East ===
Chorley East
Party	Candidate	Votes	%	±%
Labour	✓ Barry Hodson	627	75.5	
Conservative	Erik Karl Baxendale	204	24.5	
Majority		423	50.9	
Turnout		831	20.3	
Labour hold		Swing		

=== Chorley North East ===
Chorley North East
Party	Candidate	Votes	%	±%
Labour	✓ Adrian Lowe	610	66.7	
Conservative	Colin Nelson Goldsby	224	24.5	
Liberal Democrats	Glenda Charlesworth	81	8.9	
Majority		386	42.2	
Turnout		915	21.9	
Labour hold		Swing		

=== Chorley South East ===
Chorley South East
Party	Candidate	Votes	%	±%
Labour	✓ Anthony Stephen Holgate	646	59.8	
Conservative	Robert Tyler	355	32.9	
Liberal Democrats	David Porter	79	7.3	
Majority		291	26.9	
Turnout		1,080	26.9	
Labour hold		Swing		

=== Chorley South West ===
Chorley South West
Party	Candidate	Votes	%	±%
Labour	✓ Thomas McGowan	776	74.3	
Conservative	Peter Malpas	268	25.7	
Majority		508	48.7	
Turnout		1,044	19.9	
Labour hold		Swing		

=== Chorley West ===
Chorley West
Party	Candidate	Votes	%	±%
Labour	✓ Anthony Gee	720	62.6	
Conservative	Ms. Rosalie Margaret Goldsby	257	22.3	
Liberal Democrats	Mavis Porter	173	15.0	
Majority		463	40.3	
Turnout		1,150	27.7	
Labour hold		Swing		

=== Clayton-le-Woods East ===
Clayton-le-Woods East
Party	Candidate	Votes	%	±%
Liberal Democrats	✓ Simon Nicholas Jones	1,010	47.9	
Conservative	Roger Livesey	696	33.0	
Labour	Jean Cronshaw	402	19.1	
Majority		314	14.9	
Turnout		2,108	27.7	
Liberal Democrats hold		Swing		

=== Clayton-le-Woods West and Cuerden ===
Clayton-le-Woods West and Cuerden
Party	Candidate	Votes	%	±%
Labour	✓ Lesley Brownlee	528	46.3	+6.3
Conservative	John Philip Walker	419	36.8	+14.1
Liberal Democrats	Gail Patricia Ormston	193	16.9	−20.4
Majority		109	9.6	
Turnout		1,140	36.0	
Labour hold		Swing		

=== Coppull North ===
Coppull North
Party	Candidate	Votes	%	±%
Liberal Democrats	✓ Patricia Cuerden	533	60.7	+27.4
Labour	John Murphy	345	39.3	−20.0
Majority		188	21.4	
Turnout		878	31.0	
Liberal Democrats gain from Labour		Swing	+23.7	

=== Coppull South ===
Coppull South
Party	Candidate	Votes	%	±%
Liberal Democrats	✓ Derek Holland	764	70.7	+19.6
Labour	Ms. Hilary Thompson	262	24.3	−18.5
Independent	Christopher McMullan	54	5.0	N/A
Majority		502	46.5	
Turnout		1,080	36.0	
Liberal Democrats hold		Swing	+19.1	

=== Eccleston and Heskin ward ===
Eccleston and Heskin
Party	Candidate	Votes	%	±%
Labour	Thomas Titherington	946	59.8	−2.9
Conservative	Brian Twist	636	40.2	+8.7
Majority		310	19.6	
Turnout		1,582	37.0	
Labour hold		Swing	−5.8	

=== Euxton North ===
Euxton North
Party	Candidate	Votes	%	±%
Labour	✓ Thomas Gray	503	55.4	−3.7
Conservative	Peter Goldsworthy	359	39.5	+8.7
Liberal Democrats	Ms. Pauline Sharp	46	5.1	−4.9
Majority		144	15.9	
Turnout		908	30.8	
Labour hold		Swing		

=== Euxton South ===
Euxton South
Party	Candidate	Votes	%	±%
Conservative	✓ Geoffrey Russell	508	45.9	+13.5
Labour	John Cocking	497	44.9	−13.1
Liberal Democrats	Ms. Linda Norman	101	9.1	−0.5
Majority		11	1.0	
Turnout		1,106	33.2	
Conservative gain from Labour		Swing	+13.3	

=== Lostock ward ===
Lostock
Party	Candidate	Votes	%	±%
Conservative	✓ Ms. Helen Sutton	590	54.0	+22.4
Labour	James Freeman	304	27.8	−9.8
Independent Labour	David Heyes	145	13.3	N/A
Liberal Democrats	William Mellor	53	4.9	−0.5
Majority		286	26.2	
Turnout		1,092	33.5	
Conservative gain from Labour		Swing	+13.3	

=== Whittle-le-Woods ===
Whittle-le-Woods
Party	Candidate	Votes	%	±%
Conservative	✓ Margaret Ward	622	60.7	+23.2
Labour	Steven Turner	263	25.7	N/A
Liberal Democrats	Stuart Harding	140	13.7	−24.4
Majority		359	35.0	
Turnout		1,025	31.6	
Conservative gain from Liberal Democrats		Swing	+23.8	

=== Withnell ===
Withnell
Party	Candidate	Votes	%	±%
Labour	✓ Ms. Kerry Jones	595	51.7	−0.4
Conservative	Ms. Iris Elaine Smith	555	48.3	+12.4
Majority		40	3.5	
Turnout		1,150	40.3	
Labour hold		Swing	−6.4	
