= 1995 Chorley Borough Council election =

Elections in Lancashire County Council

Elections to Chorley Borough Council were held on 4 May 1995. One third of the council was up for election and the Labour Party took control (the council had been under no overall control since 1991.

After the election, the composition of the council was:

Party	Seats	±
Labour	27	▲6
Liberal Democrat	6	▲1
Conservative	16	▼7
Independent	1	Steady

== Election result ==
Source: Chorley Borough Council

Chorley local election result 1995
Party	Seats	Gains	Losses	Net gain/loss	Seats %	Votes %	Votes	+/−
Labour	14	6	0	▲6	82.4			
Conservative	0	0	7	▼7	0.0			
Liberal Democrats	3	1	0	▲1	17.6			
Independent	0	0	0	Steady	0.0			

== Ward results ==
=== Adlington ===
Adlington
Party	Candidate	Votes	%	±%
Labour	✓ Florence Molyneaux	1,133	78.6	
Liberal Democrats	J. Bleasdale	308	21.4	
Majority			57.3	
Turnout			32.9	
Labour hold		Swing		

=== Chorley East ===
Chorley East
Party	Candidate	Votes	%	±%
Labour	✓ B. Hodson	954	88.1	
Conservative	R. Charnley	129	11.9	
Majority			76.2	
Turnout			26.7	
Labour hold		Swing		

=== Chorley North East ===
Chorley North East
Party	Candidate	Votes	%	±%
Labour	✓ Adrian Lowe	988	73.8	
Labour	✓ K. Lowe	959		
Conservative	R. Goldsby	209	15.6	
Conservative	C. Goldsby	201		
Liberal Democrats	V. Jones	142	10.6	
Majority			58.2	
Turnout			31.2	
Labour hold		Swing		
Labour hold		Swing		

=== Chorley South East ===
Chorley South East
Party	Candidate	Votes	%	±%
Labour	✓ Anthony Stephen Holgate	1,101	68.2	
Conservative	E. Baxendale	385	23.5	
Liberal Democrats	David Porter	129	8.0	
Majority			44.3	
Turnout			40.3	
Labour hold		Swing		

=== Chorley South West ward ===
Chorley South West
Party	Candidate	Votes	%	±%
Labour	✓ Thomas McGowan	1,317	85.1	
Conservative	Peter Malpas	231	14.9	
Majority			70.2	
Turnout			30.4	
Labour hold		Swing		

=== Chorley West ward ===
Chorley West
Party	Candidate	Votes	%	±%
Labour	✓ A. Gee	1,193	78.2	
Conservative	E. Montgomery	333	21.8	
Majority			56.4	
Turnout			36.1	
Labour hold		Swing		

=== Clayton-le-Woods East ===
Clayton-le-Woods East
Party	Candidate	Votes	%	±%
Liberal Democrats	✓ S. Charlesworth	1,110	48.6	
Labour	E. Murphy	608	26.6	
Conservative	Alan Cullens	564	24.7	
Majority			22.0	
Turnout			30.5	
Liberal Democrats hold		Swing		

=== Clayton-le-Woods West and Cuerden ===
Clayton-le-Woods West and Cuerden
Party	Candidate	Votes	%	±%
Labour	✓ J. Cronshaw	484	40.0	
Liberal Democrats	J. Freeman	452	37.3	
Conservative	M. Muncaster	275	22.7	
Majority		32	2.6	
Turnout		1,211	39.1	
Labour gain from Conservative		Swing		

=== Coppull North ward ===
Coppull North
Party	Candidate	Votes	%	±%
Labour	✓ N. Hilton	784	59.3	
Liberal Democrats	P. Eastham	442	33.4	
Conservative	Ms. M. Stewart	97	7.3	
Majority			25.9	
Turnout			46.7	
Labour hold		Swing		

=== Coppull South ward ===
Coppull South
Party	Candidate	Votes	%	±%
Liberal Democrats	✓ E. Holland	722	52.1	
Labour	R. Lees	605	42.8	
Conservative	M. Stewart	86	6.1	
Majority			8.3	
Turnout			47.6	
Liberal Democrats hold		Swing		

=== Eccleston and Heskin ===
Eccleston and Heskin
Party	Candidate	Votes	%	±%
Labour	✓ T. Titherington	1,013	62.7	
Conservative	J. Lucas	509	31.5	
Independent	D. Staig	93	5.8	
Majority			31.2	
Turnout			40.1	
Labour gain from Conservative		Swing		

=== Euxton North ===
Euxton North
Party	Candidate	Votes	%	±%
Labour	✓ J. Berry	765	59.1	
Conservative	G. Jolly	399	30.8	
Liberal Democrats	D. Bland	130	10.0	
Majority			28.3	
Turnout			47.9	
Labour gain from Conservative		Swing		

=== Euxton South ===
Euxton South
Party	Candidate	Votes	%	±%
Labour	✓ J. Cocking	720	58.0	
Conservative	G. Simmons	403	32.4	
Liberal Democrats	P. Sharp	119	9.6	
Majority			25.5	
Turnout			36.9	
Labour gain from Conservative		Swing		

=== Lostock ===
Lostock
Party	Candidate	Votes	%	±%
Labour	✓ David Heyes	512	37.6	
Conservative	J. Rigby	430	31.6	
Independent (Politician)	M. Iddon	420	30.8	
Majority			6.0	
Turnout			42.8	
Labour gain from Conservative		Swing		

=== Whittle-le-Woods ===
Whittle-le-Woods
Party	Candidate	Votes	%	±%
Liberal Democrats	✓ M. Lavender	395	38.1	
Conservative	J. Walker	389	37.5	
Independent (Politician)	D. Yates	252	24.3	
Majority			0.6	
Turnout			38.7	
Liberal Democrats gain from Conservative		Swing		

=== Whithnell ===
Whithnell
Party	Candidate	Votes	%	±%
Labour	✓ K. Jones	395	38.1	
Conservative	M. Crook	457	35.9	
Liberal Democrats	G. Charlesworth	103	8.1	
Independent (Politician)	M. Crowther	50	3.9	
Majority			16.2	
Turnout			46.0	
Labour gain from Conservative		Swing		
