= Chisnall Hall Colliery =

Closed coal mine in Lancashire, England

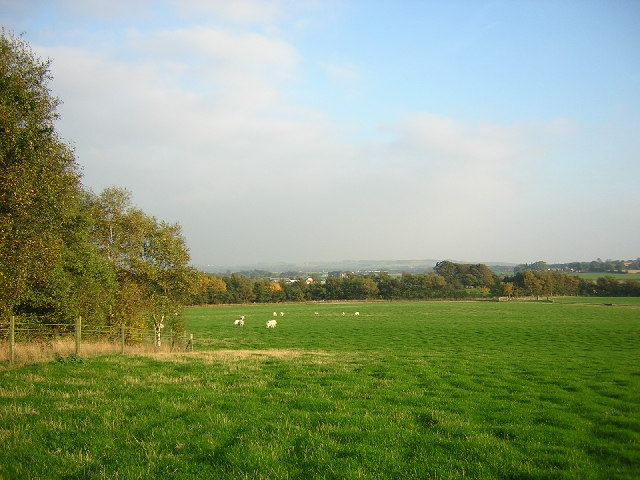
- Location of the former mine (2005)

- Former location in the Borough of Chorley

Location
- Location: Coppull, Lancashire, England; 53°36′22″N 2°40′56″W

Production
- Products: Coal
- Production: 300,000 tonnes
- Financial year: 1933
- Type: Underground

History
- Closed: 1967

Chisnall Hall Colliery was a coal mine in Coppull in Lancashire, England. It was the largest coal mine on the Lancashire Coalfield north of Wigan. The colliery on Coppull Moor was owned by Pearson and Knowles Coal and Iron Company in 1896 when it employed 135 underground and 48 surface workers. The colliery appeared on maps in 1908 as a coal mine with two shafts and railway sidings connecting its 1.5-mile mineral railway to the London and North Western Railway's West Coast Main Line. In 1930, Pearson & Knowles merged with the Wigan Coal and Iron Company and others and their collieries became the property of the Wigan Coal Corporation. More than 1,000 people were employed there in 1933 and more than 300,000 tonnes of coal were produced annually.

== Nationalisation ==
After nationalisation on 1 January 1947, major rebuilding was authorised by the National Coal Board. A new headgear and screens replaced the original structures and a coal washery was added. During the 1950s and early 1960s, more than 1000 men were employed, producing about 250,000 tons of coal per year.

== Closure ==
The colliery closed on 24 March 1967 and was the last pit in the Wigan area apart from small, privately owned mines. The washery and railway remained open for about four months, washing coal brought from Wood Pit, Haydock. The site was restored by Lancashire County Council between 1981 and 1983 and opened to the public. Little trace of the colliery or its railway survive. The two shafts were not capped and remain open and are partly filled with water. They are surrounded by high, protective brick walls.

== See also ==
- Glossary of coal mining terminology
