= Listed buildings in Clayton-le-Woods =

Clayton-le-Woods is a civil parish in the Borough of Chorley, Lancashire, England. The parish contains 12 buildings that are recorded in the National Heritage List for England as designated listed buildings. Of these, one is listed at Grade II*, the middle grade, and the others are at Grade II, the lowest grade. The parish is largely residential, the major settlement being the village of Clayton-le-Woods. The oldest listed buildings are, or originated as, farmhouses or farm buildings. Later structures are two weavers' cottages, a church, a stable, an ice house, a milestone, and a school.

== Key ==
Grade	Criteria
II*	Particularly important buildings of more than special interest
II	Buildings of national importance and special interest

== Buildings ==
Name and location	Photograph	Date	Notes	Grade
Crow Trees; 53.71488°N 2.63737°W		Early 17th century (or before)	A former farmhouse in brick with stone dressings and a slate roof. There are two storeys and three bays, and on the front wall are brick headers in lozenge patterns. The doorway is in the third bay, with a modern gabled canopy. All the windows are mullioned. Internally, there is a full cruck truss in a partition between the second and third bays, and elsewhere is an inglenook and a bressumer.	II*
Barn, Crow Trees; 53.71475°N 2.63684°W	—	Early 17th century (probable)	A cruck-framed barn, clad in brick and stone, with a slate roof, in four bays. In the first bay is a loft approached by stone steps, and in the third bay are opposed wagon entrances. Inside are two full cruck trusses.	II
Lord Nelson public house 53.70408°N 2.63652°W		1668	Originally a farmhouse, later used as a public house, it initially consisted of a hall and cross-wing, and has been extended with the addition of a large gabled wing at the front. The building is in sandstone with slate roofs, in a modified F-shaped plan, with two storeys and three bays. Between the extension and the original hall is a two-storey gabled porch with a segmental-headed doorway. Some mullioned windows have been retained, and the other windows are altered.	II
Dovecote House Farmhouse; 53.70479°N 2.64848°W	—	1698 (or earlier)	The farmhouse is in brick on a stone plinth with a slate roof, in two storeys and an attic. There is a three-bay front with two outshuts at the rear, and a single-storey stone extension in front of the first bay. To the right of this is a two-storey gabled porch. Above the doorway is a lintel inscribed in relief. The windows all contain altered glazing. Inside the house are back-to-back inglenook fireplaces with bressumers, and in the upper floor are timber-framed partitions.	II
Hawksclough Farmhouse; 53.71193°N 2.64875°W	—	c. 1700	A brick farmhouse with a stone-slate roof in three storeys with a symmetrical three-bay front. It has an L-shaped plan with a two-storey extension to the rear. The windows contain altered glazing. The house was used for Roman Catholic worship before St Bede's church was built in 1824.	II
Lilac Cottage and Lilac Cottage Three Doors Down; 53.70369°N 2.64422°W	—	Late 18th century	A pair of weavers' cottages with loomshops between them. They are in sandstone with slate roofs, in two storeys, and have a long rectangular plan with a four-bay front. The house doors are at the ends, and central paired doors are inserted into the loomshop windows. There are two more loomshop windows at the rear.	II
586 and 588 Preston Road; 53.70708°N 2.63911°W	—	Late 18th or early 19th century	A pair of weavers' cottages in sandstone with slate roofs. They have two storeys with basements, and a symmetrical two-bay front. In the centre are paired doorways with one window in each floor. In the basements are partly blocked loomshop windows at the front and rear.	II
St Bede's Church and Presbytery; 53.70775°N 2.63898°W		1823	A Roman Catholic church designed by Thomas Burgess in sandstone with a slate roof. It is in a single cell, and has three round-headed windows on the sides. On the entrance front are a round-headed doorway with a fanlight and double doors, above which are two small lunettes. On the roof is a copper bell turret with a spirelet, added in 1964. Inside is a west gallery, and a sanctuary arch with Ionic columns. Attached to the west end of the church is a presbytery with a symmetrical three-bay gabled front and 2 1/2 storeys.	II
Stable; 53.70793°N 2.63926°W	—	c. 1825	The former stable is in sandstone with large quoins and has a slate roof. There are two storeys and two bays. It has two doorways and three square windows.	II
Ice house 53.70685°N 2.65837°W	—	Early 19th century (probable)	The ice house is probably associated with Cuerden Hall. It is built in earth-covered brick, and consists of an egg-shaped vessel 11 feet (3.4 m) in diameter and 14 feet (4.3 m) high internally. The vessel is entered through a barrel vaulted tunnel 12 feet (3.7 m) long and 6 feet (1.8 m) high.	II
Milestone; 53.70918°N 2.64082°W	—	Early 19th century (probable)	The milestone consists of a wedge-shaped stone slab about 1 metre (3 ft 3 in) high. On the sides are iron plates inscribed with the distances in miles to Preston and Chorley.	II
School; 53.70783°N 2.63832°W	—	c. 1830	The school was extended, probably in the 1870s. It is in sandstone with a slate roof, and has a rectangular plan with six bays and two storeys. The porch is at the left end and has a round-headed doorway with a fanlight. Most of the windows are rectangular, and there is a round-headed window in the right gable wall.	II
