= 2018 Chorley Borough Council election =

2018 UK local government election

2018 Chorley Borough Council Election
| ← 2016 | 3 May 2018 | 2019 → |

17 of the 47 seats to Chorley Borough Council 24 seats needed for a majority

| | First party | Second party | Third party |
|---|---|---|---|
| Party | Labour | Conservative | Independent |
| Last election | 31 seats, 52.9% | 14 seats, 28.6% | 2 seats, 7.2% |
| Seats won | 14 | 2 | 0 |
| Seats after | 33 | 12 | 2 |
| Seat change | ▲2 | ▼2 | Steady |
| Popular vote | 54.4% | 36.1% | 0.0% |
| Swing | ▲1.5% | ▲7.5 | ▼2.4% |
- Winner of each seat at the 2018 Chorley Borough Council election
Leader before election
Alistair Bradley
Labour
Leader after election
Alistair Bradley
Labour

The 2018 Chorley Borough Council election took place on 3 May 2018 to elect members of Chorley Borough Council in Chorley, Lancashire, England. This was on the same day as other local elections across England.

Labour retained its majority on the Council.

== Results summary ==
The results of the 2018 elections are summarised below.

2018 Chorley Borough Council election
| Party | This election | | | Full council | | | This election | | |
| Party | Seats | Net | Seats % | Other | Total | Total % | Votes | Votes % | +/− |
|---|---|---|---|---|---|---|---|---|---|
| Labour | 14 | ▲2 | 82.4 | 19 | 33 | 68.1 | 16,071 | 54.4 | +1.5 |
| Conservative | 2 | ▼2 | 11.76 | 10 | 12 | 25.5 | 11,098 | 36.1 | +7.5 |
| Independent | 1 | Steady | 5.9 | 1 | 2 | 6.3 | 1,406 | 4.8 | -2.4 |
| Liberal Democrats | 0 | Steady | 0.0 | 0 | 0 | 0.0 | 821 | 4.4 | +0.1 |
| Green | 0 | Steady | 0.0 | 0 | 0 | 0.0 | 0 | 0.0 | -0.7 |
| UKIP | 0 | Steady | 0.0 | 0 | 0 | 0.0 | 137 | 0.4 | -5.9 |

== Ward results ==
=== Adlington & Anderton ===
Adlington & Anderton
| Party | Candidate | Votes | % | ±% |
|---|---|---|---|---|
| Labour | Albert Graham Dunn | 1,277 | 58.3 | −3.1 |
| Conservative | Edward Lowe | 803 | 36.6 | +10.8 |
| Liberal Democrats | William Pilling | 111 | 5.1 | +0.2 |
| Majority | | 474 | 21.6 | |
| Turnout | | 2,191 | | |
| Labour hold | | Swing | | |

=== Astley & Buckshaw ===
Astley & Buckshaw
| Party | Candidate | Votes | % | ±% |
|---|---|---|---|---|
| Labour | Mathew John Lynch | 1,071 | 50.7 | +11.7 |
| Conservative | Aidy Riggot | 1041 | 49.3 | −0.3 |
| Majority | | 31 | 1.4 | |
| Turnout | | 2,112 | | |
| Labour hold | | Swing | | |

=== Chisnall ===
Chisnall
| Party | Candidate | Votes | % | ±% |
|---|---|---|---|---|
| Labour | Alan Whittaker | 777 | 58.2 | +19.6 |
| Conservative | Mervyn Heyes Holden | 559 | 41.8 | −19.6 |
| Majority | | 218 | 16.3 | |
| Turnout | | 1,336 | | |
| Labour hold | | Swing | | |

=== Chorley East ===
Chorley East
| Party | Candidate | Votes | % | ±% |
|---|---|---|---|---|
| Labour | Hasina Khan | 1,195 | 74.3 | +6.9 |
| Conservative | Clare Denise Grew | 413 | 25.7 | +13.0 |
| Majority | | 782 | 48.6 | |
| Turnout | | 1,608 | | |
| Labour hold | | Swing | | |

=== Chorley North East ===
Chorley North East
| Party | Candidate | Votes | % | ±% |
|---|---|---|---|---|
| Labour | Alistair William Morwood | 1,059 | 69.0 | +5.3 |
| Conservative | Ryan Paul Hoey | 395 | 25.7 | +5.6 |
| UKIP | Tommy Sharrock | 81 | 5.3 | −11.0 |
| Majority | | 664 | 43.3 | |
| Turnout | | 1,535 | | |
| Labour hold | | Swing | | |

=== Chorley North West ===
Chorley North West
| Party | Candidate | Votes | % | ±% |
|---|---|---|---|---|
| Independent | Ralph Snape | 1,356 | 61.7 | −2.6 |
| Labour | Sarah Elizabeth Jane Ainsworth | 561 | 25.5 | +2.8 |
| Conservative | Luke Steven Kerr | 282 | 12.8 | +5.2 |
| Majority | | 795 | 36.2 | |
| Turnout | | 2,199 | | |
| Independent hold | | Swing | | |

=== Chorley South East ===
Chorley South East
| Party | Candidate | Votes | % | ±% |
|---|---|---|---|---|
| Labour | Bev Murray | 1,240 | 63.6 | |
| Conservative | Marie Elizabeth Gray | 591 | 30.3 | |
| Liberal Democrats | David Porter | 119 | 6.1 | |
| Majority | | 649 | 33.3 | |
| Turnout | | 1,950 | | |
| Labour hold | | Swing | | |

=== Chorley South West ===
Chorley South West
| Party | Candidate | Votes | % | ±% |
|---|---|---|---|---|
| Labour | Roy Lees | 1,148 | 65.4 | −8.3 |
| Conservative | Sandra Mercer | 419 | 23.9 | −2.4 |
| Liberal Democrats | Diane Elizabeth Curtis | 189 | 10.7 | New |
| Majority | | 729 | 41.5 | |
| Turnout | | 1,756 | | |
| Labour hold | | Swing | | |

=== Clayton-le-Woods & Whittle-le-woods ===
Clayton-le-Woods & Whittle-le-woods
| Party | Candidate | Votes | % | ±% |
|---|---|---|---|---|
| Conservative | James Eric Bell | 1,198 | 50.1 | +4.0 |
| Labour | Mark Clifford | 1,015 | 42.4 | +3.0 |
| Liberal Democrats | Glenda Charlesworth | 128 | 5.4 | −0.8 |
| Independent | William David Carpenter | 50 | 2.1 | New |
| Majority | | 183 | 7.7 | |
| Turnout | | 2,391 | | |
| Conservative hold | | Swing | | |

=== Clayton-le-Woods North ===
Clayton-le-Woods North
| Party | Candidate | Votes | % | ±% |
|---|---|---|---|---|
| Labour | Yvonne Marie Hargreaves | 1,025 | 61.3 | −0.5 |
| Conservative | Magda Cullens | 646 | 38.7 | +0.5 |
| Majority | | 379 | 22.6 | |
| Turnout | | 1,671 | | |
| Labour hold | | Swing | | |

=== Clayton-le-Woods West & Cuerden ===
Clayton-le-Woods West & Cuerden
| Party | Candidate | Votes | % | ±% |
|---|---|---|---|---|
| Labour | Neville Grant Whitman | 771 | 48.0 | −0.2 |
| Conservative | Mick Muncaster | 709 | 44.2 | −7.6 |
| Liberal Democrats | Patricia Ormston | 125 | 7.8 | New |
| Majority | | 62 | 3.8 | |
| Turnout | | 1,605 | | |
| Labour gain from Conservative | | Swing | | |

=== Coppull ===
Coppull
| Party | Candidate | Votes | % | ±% |
|---|---|---|---|---|
| Labour | Steve Holgate | 1,123 | 74.1 | +25.5 |
| Conservative | Carole Margaret Billouin | 393 | 25.9 | +10.1 |
| Majority | | 730 | 48.2 | |
| Turnout | | 1,516 | | |
| Labour hold | | Swing | | |

=== Eccleston & Mawdesley ===
Eccleston & Mawdesley
| Party | Candidate | Votes | % | ±% |
|---|---|---|---|---|
| Conservative | Keith Iddon | 1,179 | 53.9 | +7.8 |
| Labour | Catherine Ann Donegan | 762 | 34.8 | −5.0 |
| Liberal Democrats | Mark Robert Frost | 190 | 8.7 | New |
| UKIP | Mark Lawrence Smith | 56 | 2.6 | −11.5 |
| Majority | | 417 | 19.1 | |
| Turnout | | 2,187 | | |
| Conservative hold | | Swing | | |

=== Euxton North ===
Euxton North
| Party | Candidate | Votes | % | ±% |
|---|---|---|---|---|
| Labour | Tommy Gray | 834 | 59.0 | −13.4 |
| Conservative | Hazel Sarah Walton | 527 | 37.3 | +20.7 |
| Democrats and Veterans | Barry Edwin Mason | 52 | 3.7 | New |
| Majority | | 307 | 21.7 | |
| Turnout | | 1,413 | | |
| Labour hold | | Swing | | |

=== Euxton South ===
Euxton South
| Party | Candidate | Votes | % | ±% |
|---|---|---|---|---|
| Labour | Gillian Frances Sharples | 715 | 50.4 | +8.8 |
| Conservative | Phil Loynes | 704 | 49.6 | +5.7 |
| Majority | | 11 | 0.8 | |
| Turnout | | 1,419 | | |
| Labour gain from Conservative | | Swing | | |

=== Pennine ===
Pennine
| Party | Candidate | Votes | % | ±% |
|---|---|---|---|---|
| Labour | Gordon France | 528 | 53.5 | +9.2 |
| Conservative | Peter Malpas | 459 | 46.5 | +5.8 |
| Majority | | 69 | 7.0 | |
| Turnout | | 987 | | |
| Labour hold | | Swing | | |

=== Wheelton and Whitnell ===
Wheelton and Whitnell
| Party | Candidate | Votes | % | ±% |
|---|---|---|---|---|
| Labour | Margaret Mary France | 970 | 55.4 | −0.5 |
| Conservative | Caroline Snowden | 780 | 44.6 | +0.5 |
| Majority | | 190 | 10.8 | |
| Turnout | | 1,750 | | |
| Labour hold | | Swing | | |
