= 2019 Chorley Borough Council election =

2019 UK local government election

2019 Chorley Borough Council Election
- 2 May 2019

15 of the 47 seats to Chorley Borough Council 24 seats needed for a majority

	First party	Second party	Third party
Party	Labour	Conservative	Independent
Last election	32 seats, 54.4%	13 seats, 36.1%	2 seats, 4.8%
Seats before	8	7	2
Seats won	13	2	0
Seats after	37	8	2
Seat change	▲5	▼5	Steady
Popular vote	52.6%	36.1%	0.0%
Swing	▼1.8%	Steady	▼4.8%
- Winner of each seat at the 2019 Chorley Borough Council election
Leader before election
Alistair Bradley
Labour
Leader after election
Alistair Bradley
Labour

The 2019 Chorley Borough Council election took place on 2 May 2019 to elect members of Chorley Borough Council in Chorley, Lancashire, England. This was on the same day as other local elections across England.

All locally registered electors (British, Irish, Commonwealth and European Union citizens) who are aged 18 or over on polling day are entitled to vote in the local elections.

Labour retained its majority on the council.

== Results summary ==
The results of the 2019 elections are summarised below.

2019 Chorley Borough Council election
Party	This election			Full council			This election		
Party	Seats	Net	Seats %	Other	Total	Total %	Votes	Votes %	+/−
Labour	13	▲5	86.7	24	37	78.7	12,640	52.6	-1.8
Conservative	2	▼5	13.3	6	8	17.0	8,686	36.1	0.0
Independent	0	Steady	0.0	2	2	4.3	0	0.0	-4.8
Liberal Democrats	0	Steady	0.0	0	0	0.0	1,046	4.4	
Green	0	Steady	0.0	0	0	0.0	906	3.8	
Brexit Party	0	Steady	0.0	0	0	0.0	765	3.2	

== Ward results ==
=== Adlington & Anderton ===
Adlington & Anderton
Party	Candidate	Votes	%	±%
Labour	June Molyneaux	1,063	56.1	
Conservative	Paul Lowe	694	31.3	
Liberal Democrats	Philip Pilling	239	12.6	
Majority		369		
Turnout		2,052	34.3	
Labour hold		Swing		

=== Astley & Buckshaw ===
Astley & Buckshaw
Party	Candidate	Votes	%	±%
Labour	Laura Lennox	833	47.9	
Conservative	Peter Malpas	683	39.3	
Green	David Harrison	223	12.8	
Majority		150		
Turnout		1,764	33.6	
Labour gain from Conservative		Swing		

=== Chisnall ===
Chisnall
Party	Candidate	Votes	%	±%
Labour	Julia Berry	587	45.8	
Conservative	Martin Bashforth	414	32.3	
Brexit Party	Kerry Welsh	281	21.9	
Majority		173		
Turnout		1,293	39.2	
Labour gain from Conservative		Swing		

=== Chorley East ===
Chorley East
Party	Candidate	Votes	%	±%
Labour	Terry Brown	1,091	78.8	
Conservative	Clare Grew	294	21.2	
Majority		797		
Turnout		1,426	27.5	
Labour hold		Swing		

=== Chorley North East ===
Chorley North East
Party	Candidate	Votes	%	±%
Labour	Marion Lowe	948	70.3	
Conservative	Philip Loynes	400	29.7	
Majority		548		
Turnout		1,404	29.3	
Labour hold		Swing		

=== Chorley North West ===
Chorley North West
Party	Candidate	Votes	%	±%
Labour	Aaron Beaver	978	49.0	
Conservative	Patricia Haughton	666	33.4	
Green	Nicola Adshead	246	12.3	
Liberal Democrats	Zeljko Krizanac	106	5.3	
Majority		312		
Turnout		2,030	43.8	
Labour hold		Swing		

=== Chorley South East ===
Chorley South East
Party	Candidate	Votes	%	±%
Labour	Paul Walmsley	946	55.1	
Conservative	Neil Baglow	524	30.5	
Green	James Melling	248	14.4	
Majority		422		
Turnout		1,749	30.4	
Labour hold		Swing		

=== Chorley South West ===
Chorley South West
Party	Candidate	Votes	%	±%
Labour	Margaret Lees	878	55.0	
Conservative	Marie Gray	340	21.3	
Green	Jane Weston	189	11.8	
Liberal Democrats	Diane Curtis	188	11.8	
Majority		538		
Turnout		1,624	26.7	
Labour hold		Swing		

=== Clayton-le-Woods North ===
Clayton-le-Woods North
Party	Candidate	Votes	%	±%
Labour	Stephen Murfitt	767	52.4	
Conservative	Carole Billouin	438	29.9	
Liberal Democrats	Gail Ormston	259	17.7	
Majority		329		
Turnout		1,514	30.8	
Labour hold		Swing		

=== Clayton-le-Woods West & Cuerden ===
Clayton-le-Woods West & Cuerden
Party	Candidate	Votes	%	±%
Labour	Peter Gabbott	650	44.8	
Conservative	Michael Muncaster	566	39.0	
UKIP	John Ward	234	16.1	
Majority		84		
Turnout		1,468	35.5	
Labour gain from Conservative		Swing		

=== Clayton-le-Woods & Whittle-le-Woods ===
Clayton-le-Woods & Whittle-le-Woods
Party	Candidate	Votes	%	±%
Labour	Mark Clifford	1,121	48.3	
Conservative	Gergory Morgan	948	40.8	
Liberal Democrats	Glenda Charlesworth	254	10.9	
Majority		173		
Turnout		2,370	36.2	
Labour gain from Conservative		Swing		

=== Coppull ===
Coppull
Party	Candidate	Votes	%	±%
Labour	Alex Hilton	927	69.9	
Conservative	Sandra Mercer	400	30.1	
Majority		527		
Turnout		1,394	27.6	
Labour hold		Swing		

=== Eccleston & Mawdesley ===
Eccleston & Mawdesley
Party	Candidate	Votes	%	±%
Conservative	Martin Boardman	1,066	54.2	
Labour	Catherine Donegan	649	33.0	
Brexit Party	Richard Croll	250	12.7	
Majority		417		
Turnout		1,997	39.3	
Conservative hold		Swing		

=== Euxton South ===
Euxton South
Party	Candidate	Votes	%	±%
Conservative	Debra Platt	620	52.8	
Labour	Terence Howarth	554	47.2	
Majority		66		
Turnout		1,230	38.7	
Conservative hold		Swing		

=== Lostock ===
Lostock
Party	Candidate	Votes	%	±%
Labour	Paul Sloan	648	50.6	
Conservative	Doreen Dickinson	633	49.4	
Majority		15		
Turnout		1,330	38.5	
Labour gain from Conservative		Swing		
