= Anderton, Lancashire =

Civil parish in Lancashire, United Kingdom

Coordinates: 53.613°N 2.590°W

Anderton
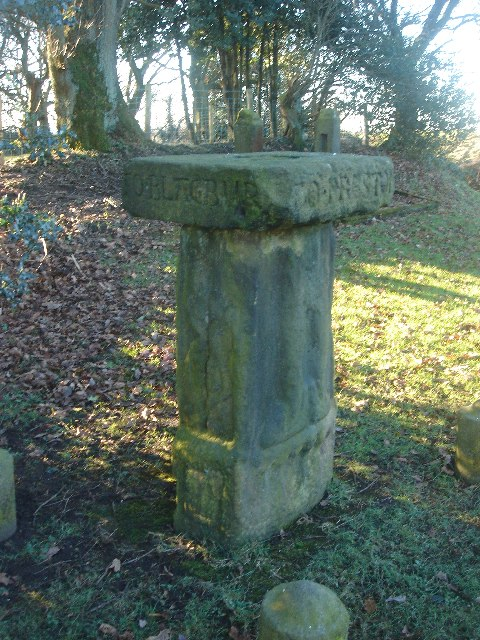
- Headless Cross, Anderton.

- Shown within Chorley Borough Location within Lancashire
- Population: 1,316 (2011)
- OS grid reference: SD610131
- Civil parish: Anderton
- District: Chorley
- Shire county: Lancashire
- Region: North West
- Country: England
- Sovereign state: United Kingdom
- Post town: CHORLEY
- Postcode district: PR6
- Dialling code: 01257
- Police: Lancashire
- Fire: Lancashire
- Ambulance: North West
- UK Parliament: Chorley

Anderton is a civil parish in the Borough of Chorley in Lancashire, England. It is now a suburb of Adlington, 5 miles (8 km) northwest of Bolton. Within its boundaries are the Rivington Reservoirs. Grimeford village is in the parish. In 2001, the parish had a population of 1,206, increasing to 1,316 at the 2011 census.

The Rivington services on the M61 are at the south of the parish.

== History ==
=== Toponymy ===
The name Anderton is derived from the Anglo-Saxon personal name Eandred and the Old English word tun – meaning the settlement belonging to Eandred. It gives its name to the Anderton family who branched out into Clayton-le-Woods, Euxton, Lostock, Birchley Hall and other places throughout Lancashire.

=== Early history ===
A Neolithic or Bronze Age stone, with a cup and ring mark dating from between 2000 and 3000 BC, was found near the Lower Rivington Reservoir in 1999, it is on view outside the Anderton Centre.

The 'headless cross', a well known local landmark from pre conquest days, was found at Rivington Church. It is thought to be one of the wayside crosses marking the medieval route between Fulford and the path which crossed Rascahay Brook, between Heath Charnock and Adlington, referred to in a medieval document printed in the Chartulary of Cockersand Abbey and dated c.1184-1190. The cross was divided between 1853 and 1855. Around 1865 the lower part of the cross was moved to Horwich whilst its corona or crown was used in a building near Chorley, before this the cross was displayed inside Rivington Church. Its lower portion was sited in its current position after the death of Lord Leverhulme with its corona or crown still missing, and known as the 'headless cross'.

Records indicate a chapel existed in 1370 at Anderton Hall and a sculptured stone depicting the shack bolts from the arms of the Andertons and a crucified figure with 'INRI' above known as the 'Anderton Stone' is now at Rivington Church and is believed to have come from Anderton Hall chapel. Above this stone is another carved with a Sator Square reading "SATOR AREPO TENET OPERA ROTAS".

=== Manor ===
The Penwortham fee, a vast barony, included Anderton and was granted to Robert Gresle, Baron of Manchester, in 1212. Over time the manor of Anderton became the shared property of families named Anderton and Cunliffe, being held in moieties.

The manor can be traced to 1281 belonging to the Andertons who also claimed a quarter of Rivington. The manor remained with the Andertons for many centuries. Old Anderton Hall is mentioned as being property of Peter the son of Oliver Anderton who died in 1559, with various buildings, lands, a watermill and half another mill in Anderton and Healey. Anderton was held of Sir Thomas Gerard and William Anderton. William was the son and heir of Peter Anderton and held the property when a child.

William Anderton made a settlement or mortgage of his estate in 1593. He appears among the freeholders in 1600 as a convicted recusant he suffered the sequestration of two-thirds of his estates in 1593 which still continued in force in 1607 and he is named again among the contributors to the subsidy in 1628. He died without issue in August 1634 holding the manor of Anderton and a water corn-mill is mentioned. His brother Peter, then seventy years of age, was his heir and had a son William.

Peter Anderton died about April 1640, and his son William had his estates confiscated and sold by Parliament in 1652. He was still living in 1664, when a pedigree was recorded. In the same year he made a settlement of the manor to Francis Anderton of Lostock, and four years later Francis purchased the estate from Peter Anderton and Roger his brother, the surviving sons of William. From this time the manor descended in the same way as Lostock – from Anderton to Blundell and Stoner.

The manor was sold by Charles Joseph Stoner in 1897 to Richard Bond, George T. Brown and Augustine Bond for £45,000. Two years later the hall and 237 acres (0.96 km^{2}) of land were sold to the Liverpool Corporation for the protection of the Rivington water supply and the remainder was divided between the purchasers, the manorial rights being included in the share of Mr. Richard Bond. No manorial courts were held.

==== Ladyhall ====
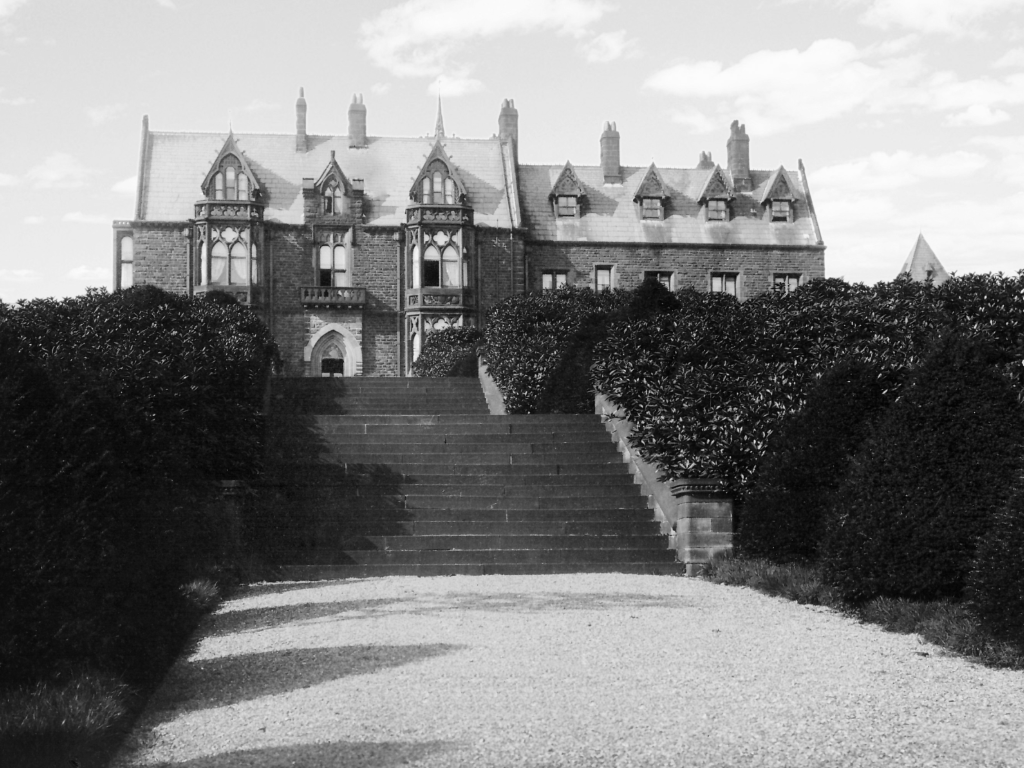
Anderton Hall, Lancashire

Ladyhall was within the Cunliffe portion of the manor. Around 1400 a moiety of the village of Anderton together with Cunliffe in Billington and Wilpshire and other lands came into the possession of Adam de Lever of Great Lever in right of his wife Margaret sister of Roger de Cunliffe. It was sold in 1629, together with Great Lever, to Bishop Bridgeman, whose son Sir Orlando in 1663 sold it to Francis Anderton of Lostock. The moieties were reunited to one owner. Ladyhall or Ladyhoug Rivington (SD61102360) was demolished for the build of the Upper Rivington Reservoir.

A large mansion known as 'Stoners' Anderton Hall was built to replace Ladyhall on the banks of the lower Rivington reservoir, demolished in 1930. The site is now occupied by the Anderton Centre, during its build in the 1970s heraldic stones once forming part of the mansions walls were found and moved to Rivington Hall where they were used to form a garden wall.

=== Industry ===
There were many hand loom weavers in Anderton in the 19th century. British muslins were first manufactured at Anderton in 1764, and that there in 1782 were for the first time in England produced 'the Balasore handkerchiefs, the jaconet and japanned muslins in the style of India.

In 1779, Samuel Oldknow purchased a number of spinning mules suitable for use in the manufacture of muslin and in 1781 Samuel entered into partnership with his brother Thomas in 1782 during which time he resided at Roscoe Lowe Farm, Anderton, expanding into the manufacture of cotton goods using the Roscoe Lowe Barn as a workshop.

Samuel Oldknow's father is interred at Rivington Unitarian Chapel. Oldknow used putting-out system of production in Anderton, whereby raw cotton was distributed to spinners and yarn to weavers who worked in their homes and workshops. The finished cloth was then returned to Oldknow's warehouse for checking and payment.

== Demography ==
Anderton covers about 498 hectares and has 530 dwellings with a population of approximately 1200 and is within the Adlington and Anderton ward.

Population growth in Anderton since 1871

Year	Pop.	±%
1871	262	—
1881	317	+21.0%
1891	454	+43.2%

Year	Pop.	±%
1901	819	+80.4%
1911	973	+18.8%
1921	956	−1.7%

Year	Pop.	±%
1931	969	+1.4%
1951	904	−6.7%
1961	992	+9.7%

Source: Vision of Britain

== Transport ==
The M61 motorway runs north through the parish, which is the site of Rivington services. The A673 is the only main road which crosses Anderton.

== Education ==
St Joseph's Catholic Primary School is a voluntary aided primary school and is located on Rothwell Road in Anderton. It has around 177 pupils, between 5 and 11 years old.

== Religious sites ==
St Joseph's Church is a Roman Catholic place of worship within the Archdiocese of Liverpool, it also serves Roman Catholics in Adlington, Heath Charnock and Rivington. Anderton New Hall, also known as Stoner's Anderton Hall stood on the Anderton side of the Lower Rivington Reservoir, was built for Charles Joseph Stoner who made significant contributions to the build of St. Joseph's Church had earlier paid for the building a presbytery at the hall.

The Hall Catholic Chapel was used by locals until 1863 when St. Joseph's Church was built. The hall was last owned by the Lawrence family and demolished in 1930. Today its armorial stones that once surrounded the building are a garden wall at Rivington Hall.

St.Paul's Anglican parish church in Adlington serves the village of Anderton's Anglicans, and residents of Anderton have the right to take part in the election of the churchwardens.

== Geography ==
More than half of the Lower Rivington Reservoir and all of the Millstone Embankment, part of the water treatment works and adjoining grazing land are within Anderton. To its west its boundary is in the Upper Rivington Reservoir near the Horrobin Embankment. At Babylon Lane Anderton seamlessly joins Adlington. The Rivington services are at the south where the boundary is the River Douglas.

== Economy ==
Leisure activities are today a feature of the area based at the Anderton Centre built on the site of 'Stoners' Anderton Hall in the 1970s. The centre features a purpose-built training facility and outdoor pursuit centre for water activities, with a restaurant, conference rooms, bedrooms and kitchen, a boat house and jetty, private tree-lined drive to the centre, and open fields with wooded areas. The centre has 20 ensuite bedrooms, self-catering accommodation block, veranda on 1st floor with a boat house, small wooden jetty, private tree-lined drive to the centre and open fields with wooded areas. The charity-run Anderton Centre is operated by Lancashire Outdoor Activities Initiative and is also a Royal Yachting Association (RYA) training centre for nationally accredited sailing, power boat and safety boat courses. The centre has exclusive access to Lower Rivington reservoir for sailing and paddlesports, and at approximately 2 km long x 0.5 km wide it is the largest body of water to sail on in Lancashire.

== Landmarks ==
Main article Listed buildings in Anderton, Lancashire

There are twelve grade II listed buildings and structures within Anderton that are nationally important and of special interest. The earliest is the Headless Cross, a pre conquest Scheduled Monument located in Grimeford Village at SD 6190 1302. Early in the twentieth century William Lever, 1st Viscount Leverhulme adapted the Headless Cross to make a sun dial at his Bungalow in Rivington. The monument was moved to its current position by his son the 2nd Viscount Leverhulme in 1925. The most recently constructed of the twelve grade II listed buildings being 'Brown Low', a house and outbuildings that was built in 1907 for C F & L Sixsmith. The designs are by Charles Holden, a leading architect from Bolton, then resident in London.

Other buildings and structures grade II listed are Roscoe Lowe built 1759 and its Barn and Shippon built 1588, once used as a base by Samuel Oldknows as a workshop. Norris Fold Farmhouse & Cottage and garden wall, built 1710. Greenhalgh Farmhouse built 1703 on site of earlier build. Heskins Farmhouse, built 1715. Stocks c. 10 metres west of Headless Cross Headless Cross, dated 1808. Tan Pits Farmhouse built 1722 and Pigsty east of Tan Pits Farmhouse built in the eighteenth century. Barn north of Anderton Old Hall Farmhouse built in the eighteenth century. Stable north of Anderton Old Hall Farmhouse, 1720.
