= Astley Village =

Civil parish in Lancashire, England

Coordinates: 53.661°N 2.644°W

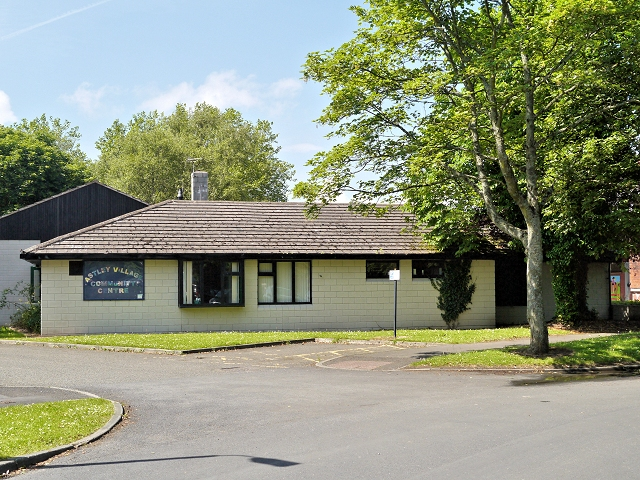
- Astley Village Community Centre (2014)

- Shown within Chorley Borough Location within Lancashire
- Population: 3,005 (2011 Census)
- OS grid reference: SD575185
- Civil parish: Astley Village
- District: Chorley
- Shire county: Lancashire
- Region: North West
- Country: England
- Sovereign state: United Kingdom
- Post town: CHORLEY
- Postcode district: PR6, PR7
- Dialling code: 01257
- Police: Lancashire
- Fire: Lancashire
- Ambulance: North West
- UK Parliament: Chorley

Astley Village is a civil parish in the Borough of Chorley in Lancashire, England, covering a suburb of Chorley. According to the 2011 census, its population was 3,005.

== History ==
Astley was constructed in the 1970s as a new village. The civil parish was created on 1 April 1991, prior to which the village was divided between the unparished area of Chorley and the parish of Euxton.

== Community ==
Astley Village is best known for Astley Park, which hosted the Royal Lancashire Show for a number of years.

Long Croft Meadow backs onto Chorley Hospital, and the main road through the village is Chancery Road. The village is bypassed via West Way (B5252), a link road opened in 1984 to take traffic off the busy Chancery Road.
