= Buckshaw Village =

Residential and industrial area in Lancashire, England

Coordinates: 53.683°N 2.664°W

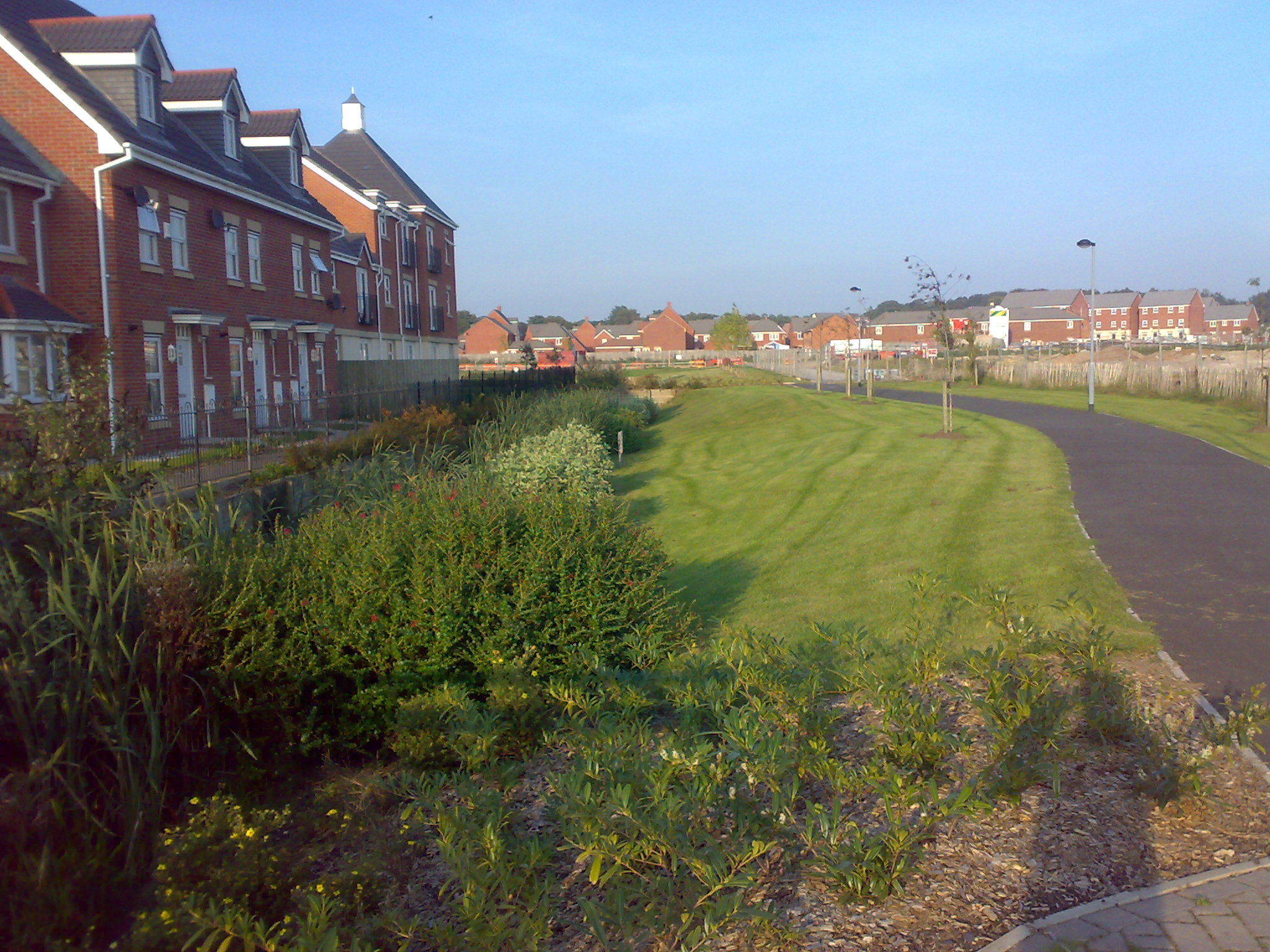
- Buckshaw Village, Euxton

- Shown with Chorley Borough Shown with South Ribble Borough Location within Lancashire
- Population: 4,000
- OS grid reference: SD562210
- Civil parish: Euxton; Whittle-le-Woods; Unparished area in Leyland
- District: Chorley; South Ribble
- Shire county: Lancashire
- Region: North West
- Country: England
- Sovereign state: United Kingdom
- Post town: CHORLEY
- Postcode district: PR7
- Dialling code: 01772
- Police: Lancashire
- Fire: Lancashire
- Ambulance: North West
- UK Parliament: Chorley

Buckshaw Village (often shortened to Buckshaw) is a 21st-century village and industrial area between the towns of Chorley and Leyland in Lancashire, England, developed on the site of the former Royal Ordnance Factory (ROF) Chorley. It had a population of 4,000. It is divided between the civil parishes of Euxton (south) and Whittle-le-Woods (north east) in Chorley, with the north western part being in Leyland unparished area in South Ribble district.

The new development covers several square miles, mainly consisting of the part of Euxton known as Buckshaw, which was requisitioned by the War Office in the 1930s. It is described by developers Redrow plc as "One of the largest brownfield schemes of its kind throughout Europe"; as of 2022, they report that over 3,000 homes have been built and 10,000 jobs created.

== Sustainability ==
The area is being developed in line with sustainable development principles and aims to transform a former brownfield munitions site. All landscaping is designed so that no earth is transported off-site, with the stripped top soil now present in mounds dotted around the village. A trial scheme is in progress which uses recycled garden waste combined with sandy clay (loam) to produce compost. The compost is then spread over the mounds to produce woodland areas and green public spaces.

The transport strategy also incorporates sustainable principles with cycle lanes and public transport included in the masterplan. Improvements to the neighbouring M6 and M61 junctions have also been made. Public transport is catered for by the new railway station that has been built.

Designing for storm water drainage run-off uses sustainable urban drainage systems (SUDS), which ensure no discharge leaves the site into neighbouring water courses. Measures include roadside verge soakaways and the use of retention ponds, which are fully integrated into the landscaping.

Amenities include a village centre (developed by Eden Park Developments Ltd) with shops and all-weather sports pitches, one of the five primary schools in Euxton and a medical centre. Planning permission was approved in February 2007 for a community centre which also provides office facilities for the local police.

== Industry / commerce ==
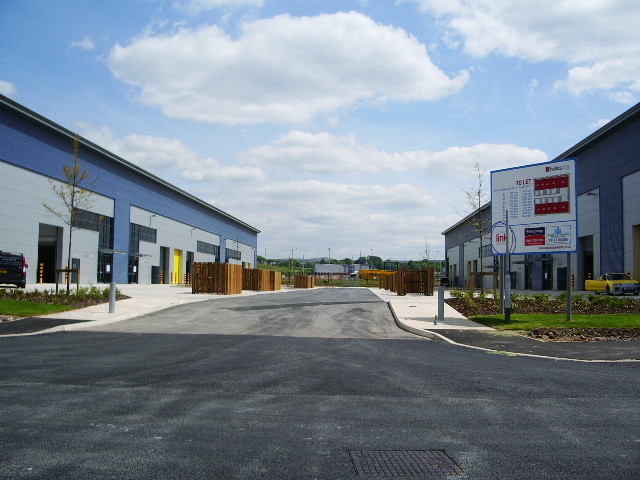
Industrial units in Buckshaw Village

Two halves of the development are separated by a new road called Central Avenue. To the west is an industrial and commercial centre known as Matrix Business Park. Planning permission was granted in January 2007 for Buckshaw Village's first pub. The Pub which is owned and run by Marston's was named the Bobbin Mill, and is situated in Plot 1000B of Matrix Park, which opened on 7 April 2008.

Another major road, Buckshaw Avenue has been built running west–east through Buckshaw Village connecting Central Avenue to the A6. Buckshaw Avenue opened to the public in May 2007.

=== Revolution Park ===
Plans were announced in February 2006 for a new industrial development called Revolution Park, by property developers HelioSlough (a joint venture between Helios Properties PLC and Slough Estates). The 30-hectare (74-acre) site is accessed via Buckshaw Avenue and is situated in the south-east portion of the Buckshaw Village site. This is adjacent to the 2 1/2-hectare (6.2-acre) plot occupied by Lex Auto Logistics' new distribution centre, completed in late 2006.

=== Buckshaw Link ===
Another commercial development by Helioslough, called Buckshaw Link, had been built and completed by late 2010 and all the businesses were in place by 2011. The industrial estate is situated on land to the west of Revolution Park. A number of warehouse and industrial units are situated there, with 4 acres (16,000 m^{2}) of space left over for other usage.

Multipart Solutions Limited the successor to Chorley's Leyland Trucks unit moved to a new purpose built site on Buckshaw in 2007.

Badger Office Supplies, the largest supplier of remanufactured ink and 12th fastest growing company in the United Kingdom, is situated near the Tesco supermarket. Merlin Cycles are one of the UK's longest established online bike shops and mail order specialists. They are based in unit A1, Ordnance Road.

== Housing ==
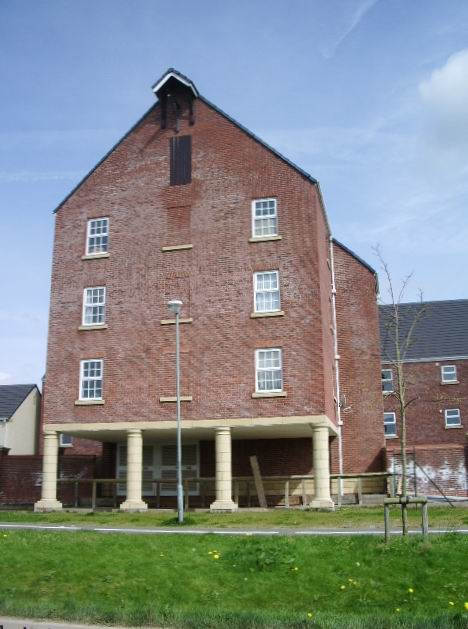
Housing development in Buckshaw Village, reminiscent of 19th-century warehouses

Up to 2000 new housing units are being built by various housebuilders, including Redrow, Barratt Homes, Persimmon, and Rowland Homes. The homes are mainly targeted at the family market but many of the new homes are also specifically aimed at first-time buyers with measures such as shared ownership schemes. Additionally, a joint venture between the Hica Group and Caddick Group sees the construction of a new retirement village designed to accommodate 200 homes aimed at over 55's. This will be situated to the west of Central Avenue adjacent to BAE Systems.

There is also an eco-friendly village built in conjunction with scientists from University of Manchester, who are testing various experimental and environmentally friendly principles. The homes will use a variety of energy sources, from geothermal and solar power to wind energy. The scheme is now a show village after opening on 25 May 2006.

This scheme was extended into a new development by Persimmon Homes into the Water's Edge development, which features an extension to the local Trinity Church of England/Methodist Primary School. The homes also offer different ways of generating power, such as the solar panels seen on many houses.

== Heritage ==
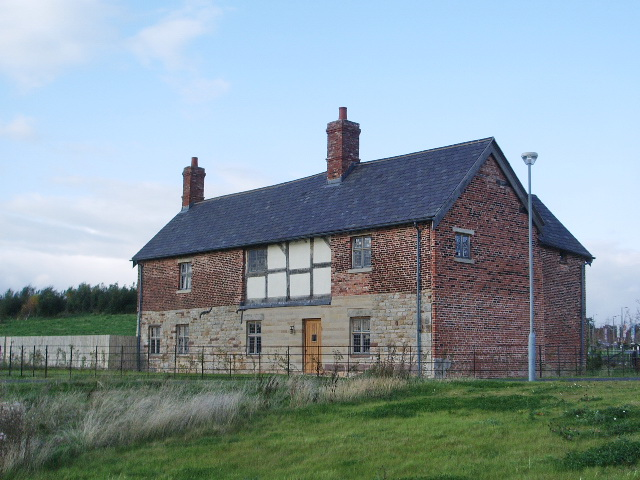
Old Worden Hall

There are two listed buildings in this area that the ROF had a duty of care over. The smaller of these is Worden Old Hall, a grade II* listed building from the late sixteenth and early seventeenth century which was the ancestral seat of the Farrington family of Worden and not part of Euxton, but rather part of South Ribble.It had fallen into disrepair to the extent that it appeared on English Heritage's Buildings At Risk register, but was redeveloped by the Maysand Group over three years, finishing in August 2006

The other building is probably the oldest intact building in Euxton, namely Buckshaw Hall, which was built in the 1650s for the Robinson family, land owners from Chorley.

Both buildings are located not far from the area known as Upper Buckshaw.

== Transport ==
Road connections nearby include the motorways M6 and M61, as well as the A6 and A49 roads.

Buckshaw Parkway railway station is one of Euxton's two railway stations (the other being Euxton Balshaw Lane railway station); it opened on 3 October 2011. The railway station is situated opposite Runshaw College, and provides two trains per hour south to Manchester Airport or two trains per hour north to Blackpool North through Preston.

Two public bus routes operate through the village, with both routes operating between Chorley and Preston. The half-hourly 109 service is run by Stagecoach Merseyside & South Lancashire and operates through Central Avenue then northbound to Leyland, Lostock Hall and Walton-le-Dale and southbound to Euxton. The hourly 119 service is operated by Tyrers Coaches on behalf of Lancashire County Council through the industrial estate and Old Worden Avenue then northbound to Leyland and Penwortham and southbound to Chorley Hospital. The 119 mainly operates through the village on a similar route to the former 109A and does not operate on Sundays. Buckshaw is also served by school buses and buses to Runshaw College.

The developers of Buckshaw Village have incorporated an extensive cycle network into the masterplan and were awarded the 2005 Sustrans National Cycle Network Award for Excellence for Developer Infrastructure. Buckshaw Village forms part of the National Cycle Route 55 of the National Cycle Network.

== Divisions ==
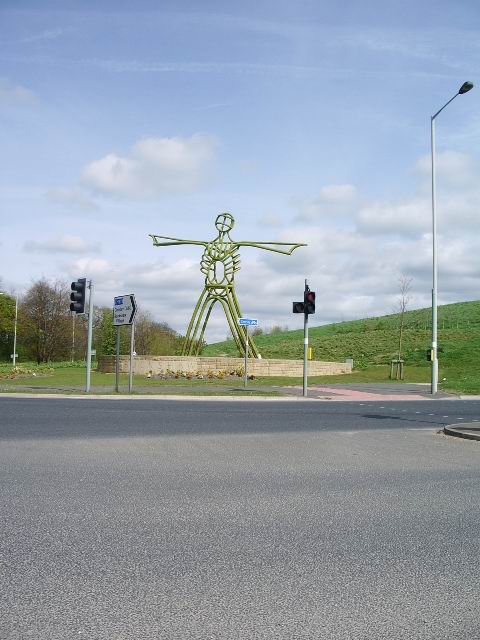
The "Green Man" sculpture

Buckshaw Village is split with sections in three Parish and Borough boundaries. Matrix Park and the northwest tip of the area is in Leyland (i.e. South Ribble Borough Council), with a few homes on the Eastern side when built falling within the Whittle-le-Woods parish boundary.

The majority of the residents live in the geographic part of Euxton. Both Euxton and Whittle-le-Woods Parish Councils fall within Chorley Borough Council, where the development largely falls in the Buckshaw & Whittle Ward, with a smaller part of the development falling in the Euxton Ward. In regard to Lancashire County Council, the majority of Buckshaw continues to sit with Euxton under the Euxton, Buckshaw & Astley Division.
