= Heskin =

Coordinates: 53.633°N 2.734°W

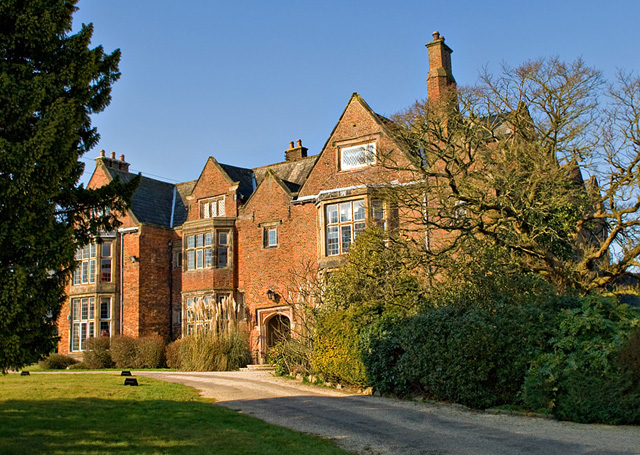
- Heskin Hall

- Shown within Chorley Borough Location within Lancashire
- Population: 906 (2021 census)
- OS grid reference: SD515155
- Civil parish: Heskin
- District: Chorley
- Shire county: Lancashire
- Region: North West
- Country: England
- Sovereign state: United Kingdom
- Post town: CHORLEY
- Postcode district: PR7
- Dialling code: 01257
- Police: Lancashire
- Fire: Lancashire
- Ambulance: North West
- UK Parliament: Chorley

Heskin is a small village and civil parish of the Borough of Chorley in Lancashire, England. According to the 2001 United Kingdom census it has a population of 883 increasing to 898 at the 2011 Census. This increased to 906 at the 2021 Census.

== Toponymy ==
The name Heskin is of Brittonic origin. As with Haskayne, the first element is hesg meaning "sedge" (cf. Welsh hesg, Gaelic seisg). This is suffixed possibly with -īn, an adjectival and toponymic suffix.

== Architecture ==
=== Heskin Hall ===
Heskin Hall dates back to 1548. The last people to occupy the hall as a residential home were Lord Lilford and his fourth wife in the 1960s. Since then the hall has been used commercially for antique sales, and other uses including Blackburn College who have used it for training and educational purposes. The hall is now registered as a venue for weddings and civil ceremonies and has a restaurant to cater for the visitors to the Antique Centre and Garden Centre which opened in 2010.

==== Ghosts ====
The hall is said to be haunted by a young Catholic girl, and an older man. The pair are thought to be from the time of Oliver Cromwell who stayed at the hall on his travels. The young girl is said to have been sacrificed by a Catholic priest, who hanged her as a sign that he had converted from Catholicism to Protestantism. Civil war soldiers were not convinced of his conversion so they hanged him from the same spot as the young girl. Lady Lilford's guests in the 1960s are said to have swiftly departed from the house during a dinner party after experiencing a ghostly appearance of a resident ghost during their stay.

== Geography ==
The elevation in the centre of Heskin is about 55m, the land rising significantly to a maximum of 110m in the South towards Wrightington Bar. To the west of Heskin, the flat coastal plain stretches towards Southport on the coast.

== See also ==
- Listed buildings in Heskin
- Bob Gregson (1778–1824), bare-knuckle fighter born in the village
