= Clayton-le-Woods =

Village in Lancashire, England

Coordinates: 53.697°N 2.660°W

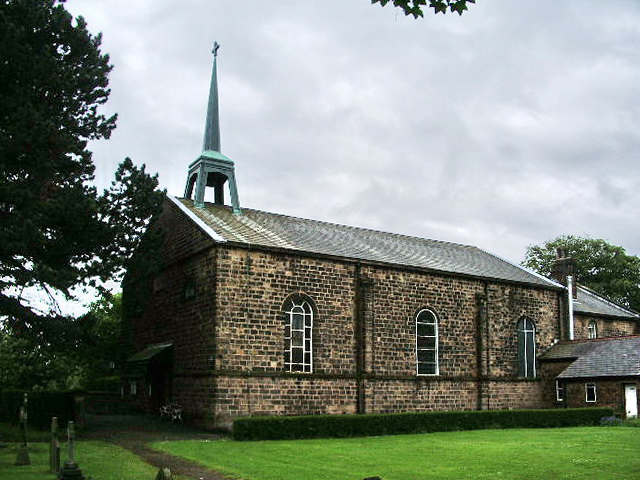
- St Bede's Catholic Church, Clayton-le-Woods

- Shown within Chorley Borough Location within Lancashire
- Population: 15,065 (2021 Census)
- OS grid reference: SD560222
- Civil parish: Clayton-le-Woods
- District: Chorley
- Shire county: Lancashire
- Region: North West
- Country: England
- Sovereign state: United Kingdom
- Post town: CHORLEY
- Postcode district: PR6
- Post town: LEYLAND
- Postcode district: PR25
- Dialling code: 01257; 01772
- Police: Lancashire
- Fire: Lancashire
- Ambulance: North West
- UK Parliament: Chorley

Clayton-le-Woods (commonly shortened to Clayton) is a large village and civil parish of the Borough of Chorley, in Lancashire, England. According to the census of 2001, it has a population of 14,528. At the 2011 census the population of Cuerden civil parish was included within Clayton-le-Woods, giving a total of 14,532.

== History ==
South-west of the village at Bluebell Woods, on the northern side of Bryning Brook is the site of Clayton Hall. The now-demolished 17th-century building was on a moated site thought to date from the medieval period. The waterfilled moat survives best at its north and north-east sides and access was by a causeway at the north-west corner. To the north and west are two fishponds connected to the moat. The area is protected by scheduled monument status.

The Roman Catholic St. Bede's Church opened on Preston Road in 1824. Designed by Thomas Burgess in sandstone with a slate roof, its layout is a single cell with three round-headed windows on the sides. A copper bell turret with a spirelet was added in 1964.

== Geography ==
Situated to the north of the town of Chorley, Clayton-le-Woods is only a few miles from the city of Preston and adjacent to the large villages of Leyland and Bamber Bridge. The villages of Clayton Brook, Whittle-le-Woods, Brindle and Buckshaw Village are also located next to Clayton-le-Woods.

The village is divided in two by Cuerden Valley Park and the River Lostock, the western part bordering Leyland and the eastern bordering Whittle-le-Woods. There is also a smaller area called Wood End, West of the village, close to Leyland. It was built between the 1960s and 1980s.

== Community ==
The village has six primary schools in its vicinity. The primary schools are, Clayton-le-Woods CE, Lancaster Lane, Westwood, Clayton Brook, Manor Road and St Bede's RC. A library was built in the village in 1985, located in Clayton Green next to Cuerden Valley Park.

There are a number of pubs, a large supermarket (Asda), a sports centre and two hotels all located within the village. Charcoal burning is still being carried out by coppicing the woods, in the grounds of nearby Cuerden Hall.

There are also linen hand weavers' cottages which are located on Sheep Hill Lane.

== Transport ==
=== Bus ===
Clayton-le-Woods bus services are operated by, Preston Bus, and Stagecoach Merseyside & South Lancashire.

=== Cycling ===
Cycling Route 55 connects Clayton-le-Woods with Buckshaw Village and Euxton via Cuerden Valley Park.

=== Road ===
The village lies along the A6 known locally as Preston Road, as well as this, Clayton-le-Woods is connected by the B5256 between Blackburn and Leyland, the B5254 between Clayton and Leyland, the M6, the M61 and the M65. Further roads, such as the A49, connect Clayton to Buckshaw Village, Euxton, Charnock Richard and Wigan.

== Notable people ==
- Leonora Carrington (1917–2011), surrealist painter, born in Westwood House, Clayton Green, lived in Mexico City.
- Phil Jones (born 1992), footballer grew up locally, played 204 games including 169 for Manchester United and 27 for England.
- Adam Henley (born 1994), footballer who played 267 games including 250 for Chorley and 2 for Wales

== Gallery ==
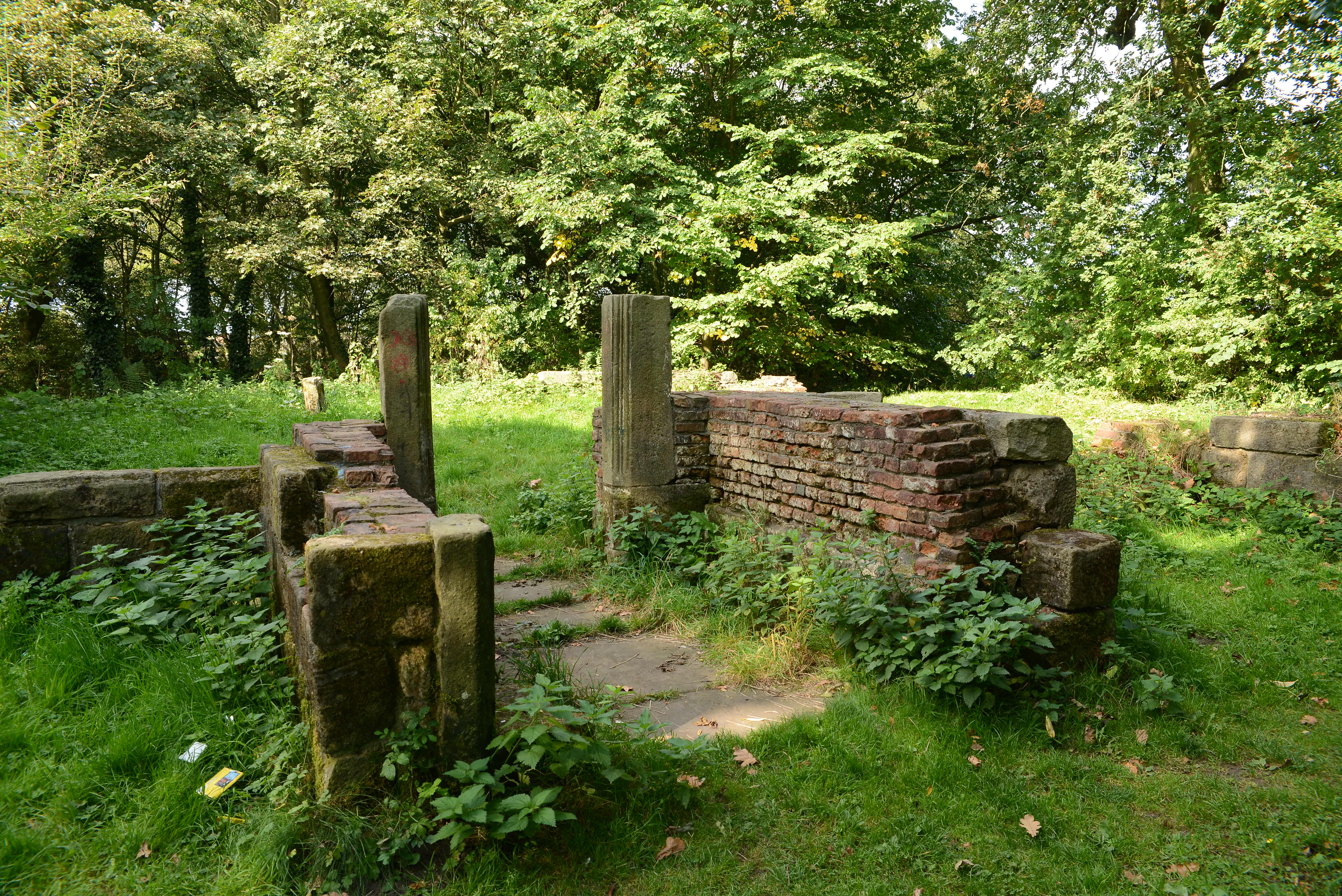
The site of Clayton Hall

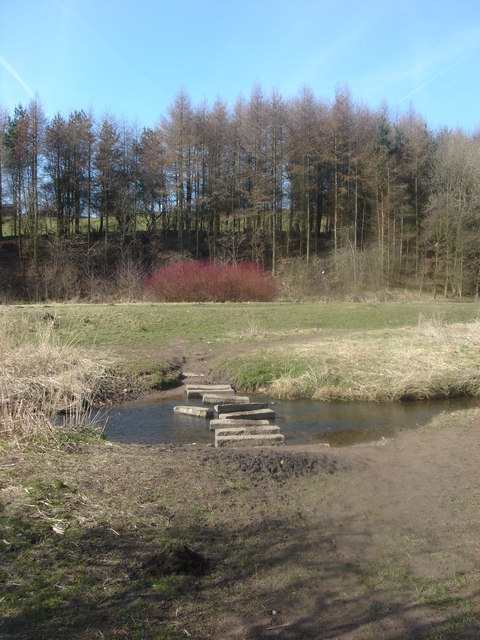
Cuerden Valley Park

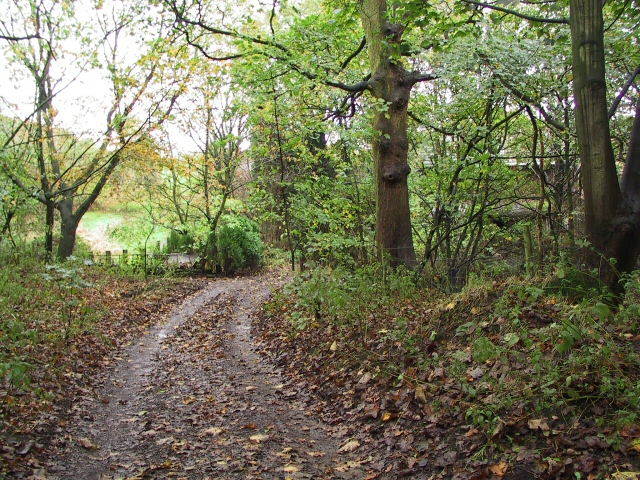
Clayton Brook (footpath)

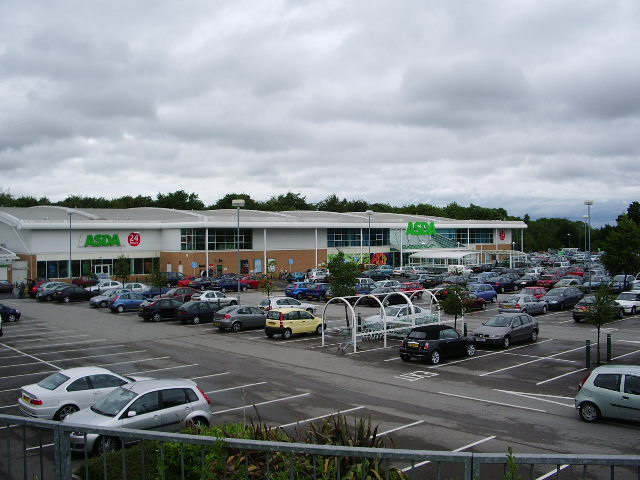
Asda store, Clayton Green (2007)

== See also ==
- Listed buildings in Clayton-le-Woods
- Scheduled monuments in Lancashire
