= Coppull =

Village in Lancashire, England

Coordinates: 53.620°N 2.661°W

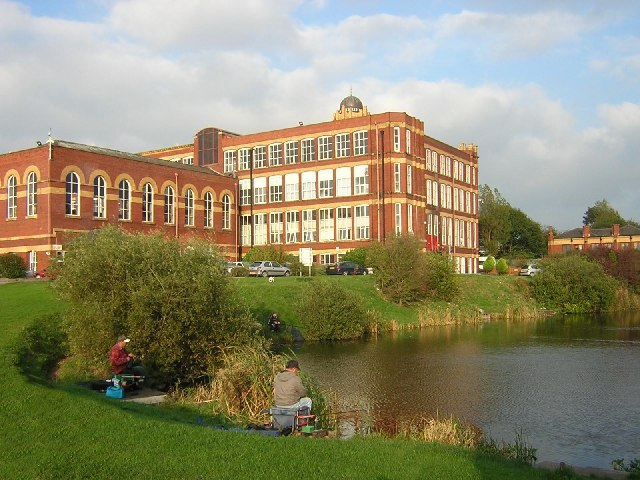
- Coppull Mill and Coppull Lodge

- Shown within Chorley Borough Location within Lancashire
- Population: 8,300 (2021 Census)
- OS grid reference: SD562140
- Civil parish: Coppull
- District: Chorley
- Shire county: Lancashire
- Region: North West
- Country: England
- Sovereign state: United Kingdom
- Post town: CHORLEY
- Postcode district: PR7
- Dialling code: 01257
- Police: Lancashire
- Fire: Lancashire
- Ambulance: North West
- UK Parliament: Chorley

Coppull is a village and civil parish in Lancashire, England. It is part of the Borough of Chorley, lies around 300 feet (91 m) above sea level. Its population is around 8,000, having been counted at 8,300 in the 2021 Census. It is bounded by Whittle Brook, Clancutt Brook, the River Yarrow, Eller Brook, Hic-Bibi Brook and Stars Brook. Coppull is located between Chorley and Standish, Greater Manchester, to the east of the A49 road near Charnock Richard.

== History ==
It is possible that a Roman road between Wigan and Walton-le-Dale passed over Coppull Moor according to the Chorley and District Historical and Archaeological Society after excavating a site there in 1959 and 1985.

The settlement has an Anglo Saxon name describing its topography derived from the Old English copp a hill top and hyll a hill. The township was variously recorded as Cophull and Cophulle in 1277, Copphull in 1351, Copthull in 1374 and Coppull from 1444.

The township was originally held by the lords of Worthington until the manor of Coppull was granted to a family of that name under them. Richard of Coppull granted land to Burscough Priory. In the reign of Edward IV, Sir Thomas Stanley bought the manor and it descended with the Stanley property at Lathom until 1600 when William, Earl of Derby sold it to Edward Rigby of Duxbury. In 1755 the owners were named Livesey and John Hodson of Ellerbeck bought it in 1820. The Worthingtons were recusants who kept the old faith, Roman Catholicism. Thomas Worthington became a priest at the English College, Douai and was sent to the Tower in 1584.

Chisnall was held by a family of that name. Roger and John de Chisnall are mentioned in 1277 and 1292. Roger de Chisnall settled land and property on Roger and his brothers Robert, John and Thomas in 1347. John Chisnall, when he died in 1525, held land and property in Coppull and Worthington of the Earl of Derby. Richard Worthington was a Member of Parliament for Wigan between 1688 and 1689 and sat for Preston as a Tory in 1690. Blainscough belonged to the Worthingtons who lived there until after the Civil War.

=== Industrial Revolution ===
A water mill at Birkacre was leased by Richard Arkwright for cotton spinning in 1778 but was set on fire by machine wreckers in 1779. The mill was rebuilt and used for calico printing, dyeing and bleaching. Water power was replaced by steam. Birkacre Colliery opened in 1880 to supply the works which employed more than 800 people in 1883. The works and colliery closed in the 1930s and many of the buildings demolished in the 1960s.

The North Union Railway between Wigan and Preston opened in 1838. Coppull Colliery was owned by John Hargreaves. On 20 May 1852 was an explosion of firedamp, found to be caused by a lighted candle, 90 men suffering from chokedamp or burns escaped but 36 men and boys died. The colliery was renamed Hic Bibi Colliery (Note: "Hic Bibi", Latin for "here drink I" was the name given to a well from which Oliver Cromwell was supposed to have drunk on a lane that now carries the name.) in the 1860s. It had several owners and after it closed in the 1880s, fireclay was used at a brickworks started and operated by the Ellerbeck Collieries Company until it closed in 1959. Chisnall Hall Colliery on Coppull Moor was owned by Pearson and Knowles Coal and Iron Company in 1896 when it employed 135 underground and 48 surface workers. After 1850 Coppull grew rapidly, many rows of houses were built to house coal miners and factory workers. There were several collieries and deep shafts were sunk for the John Pit, Springfield Pit, Blainscough, Hic Bibi, Darlingtons, Ellerbeck Colliery, Birkacre and Pearsons mines. Mineral lines carried coal tubs to the main railway.

Two large red brick spinning mills, Coppull Mill in 1906, and Mavis Mill were built in the early 20th century. Coppull Mill has been converted for other uses and is a Grade II listed building. The last surviving collieries were Chisnall Hall and Ellerbeck.

== Governance ==
Coppull was a township in the ecclesiastical parish of St Wilfrid, Standish in the Hundred of Leyland. It was a member of the Chorley Poor Law Union formed in 1837 that took responsibility for the administration and funding of the Poor Law. Coppull became part of Chorley Rural Sanitary District from 1875 to 1894, and part of Chorley Rural District from 1894 to 1974. Since 1974, it is a civil parish and electoral ward in the Borough of Chorley.

== Economy ==
Since the decline in manufacturing and the end of the coal industry, the village has been converted into a satellite town for commuters to Chorley and Wigan. Notable industries today include The Yew Tree Dairy, Morris' Bakery and Staveley's egg producer.

== Transport ==
Intersecting the village is the B5251 road, which connects Chorley to the Wigan-Preston Road. The village's closest motorway connections are the M6 Junction 27 at Standish and the M61 Junction 8 at Chorley.

Coppull is served by regular Bee Network services to Wigan (the 632) and Chorley Interchange and Stagecoach bus services to Chorley. Network Chorley service operated within the village until the early/mid 2010’s.

The village was previously served by the Blackpool to Liverpool Line which stopped at Coppull railway station but the station was closed in 1969. Recently there has been a campaign from locals to re-open the station.

== Religion ==
There was a chapel in Coppull before the Reformation. After it fell into ruin, it was replaced in 1654 and was probably served from the parish church in Standish but was later used by Presbyterians. It was closed in 1715 and secured for the Church of England. A grant from Queen Anne's Bounty in 1716 led to the appointment of a perpetual curate. It was rebuilt in 1758 and again in 1861.

The village has several places of worship, Coppull Parish C of E Church, St John the Divine C of E Church, St Oswald's Roman Catholic Church and Spendmore Lane Methodist Church.

== Sport ==
Owing to Coppull's coal mining history and proximity to Wigan, the sport of rugby league has had a strong presence in the village. Chorley Panthers is a successful youth and amateur club based at Chisnall playing fields. Coppull is also home to Coppull United F.C, an amateur football team who currently play in the West Lancashire Premier Division.

An amateur and professional boxing club is based at Coppull Mill.

Coppull also has a long tradition of Martial Arts with both Karate and Kung Fu clubs in the district. Red Sun Shotokan Karate Club has been based at St. John's Church Hall in Coppull since 1986 and was founded by P.A.J. Handyside, 9th Dan.

Coppull is also home to Springfield Park Leisure Centre which holds classes for all age groups including freestyle, trampolining and indoor rock climbing.

== Notable people ==
- Amanda Roocroft (born 1966), opera singer
- John Barry Mason (1935–2021), songwriter known professionally as Barry Mason

== See also ==
- Listed buildings in Coppull
- List of mining disasters in Lancashire
