= Cuerden =

Village in Lancashire, England

Coordinates: 53.706°N 2.660°W

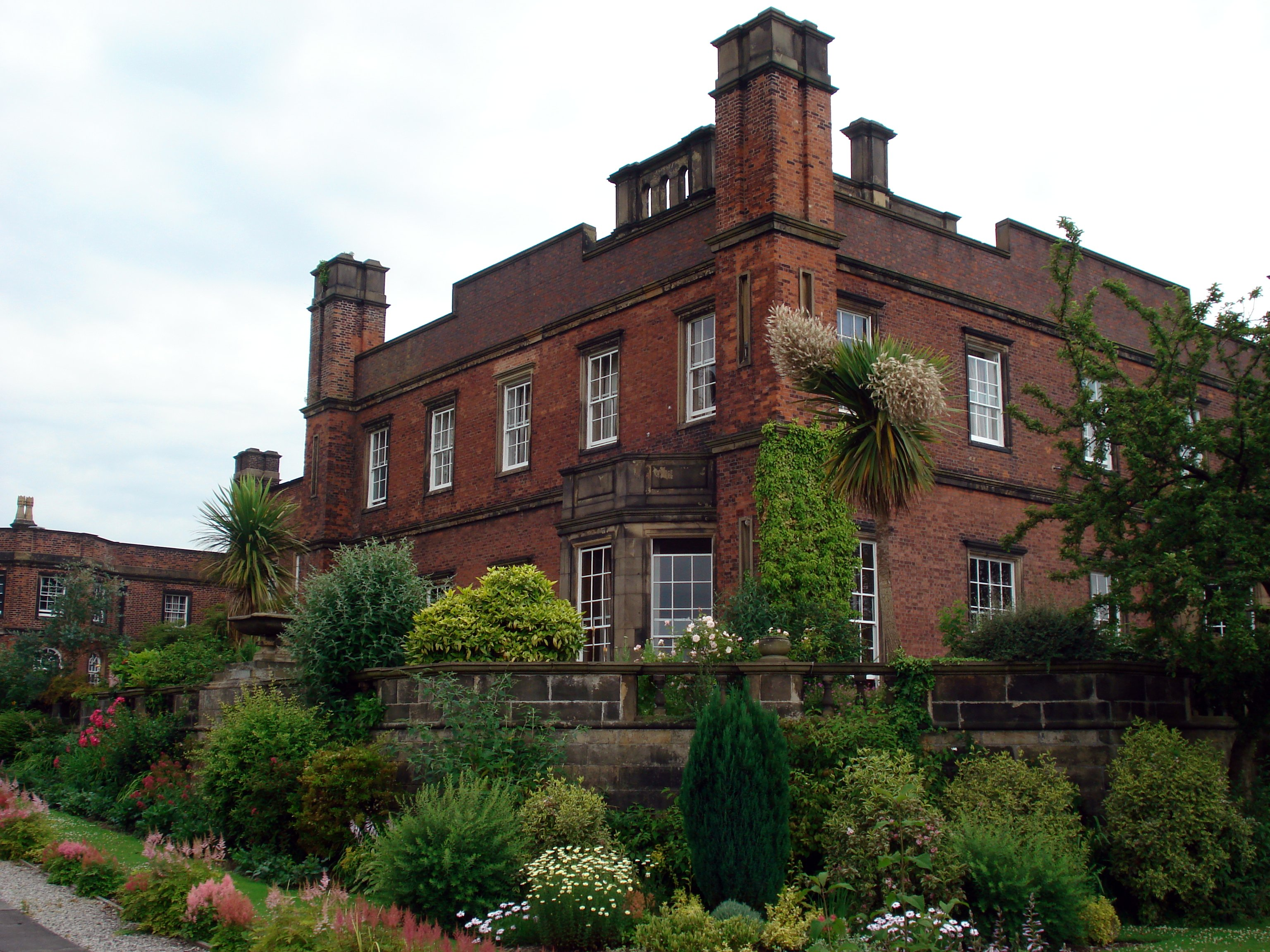
- Cuerden Hall

- Shown within Chorley Borough Location within Lancashire
- Population: 183 (2021)
- OS grid reference: SD565235
- Civil parish: Cuerden
- District: Chorley
- Shire county: Lancashire
- Region: North West
- Country: England
- Sovereign state: United Kingdom
- Post town: PRESTON
- Postcode district: PR5
- Post town: LEYLAND
- Postcode district: PR25
- Dialling code: 01772
- Police: Lancashire
- Fire: Lancashire
- Ambulance: North West
- UK Parliament: Chorley

Cuerden is a village and civil parish of the Borough of Chorley, in Lancashire, England. It is situated between Bamber Bridge and Leyland, and had a population of 77 in 2001. At the 2011 census the population was included within Clayton-le-Woods civil parish. In the 2021 Census, the population was 183.

== History ==
The name speculatively derives from the Welsh cerdin, the plural of cerdinen, "rowan", although the nearby Cuerdale derives from an Anglo-Saxon personal name. It could also be a derivation of 'coeur de lion' or Lionheart. The manor was given to Vivian Molyneux by Roger de Poitou and devolved to the Banastres, Charnocks, Langtons, and Fleetwoods.

The manor house, Cuerden Hall, is a country house begun in the 1717 on the site of a 17th-century house, and extended between 1816 and 1819 by Lewis Wyatt. During the Industrial Revolution, two cotton mills were built by the river by William Clayton and William Eccles, and employed more than seven hundred people in 1848.

St Saviour's Church was built in 1836–37, to a design by the architect Edmund Sharpe.

== Governance ==
Cuerden was a township in the ancient ecclesiastical parish of Leyland and the Leyland hundred. It became part of the Chorley Poor Law Union, formed in 1837, which took responsibility for the administration and funding of the Poor Law and built a workhouse in that area.

== Geography ==
Cuerden covered 800 acres about 4½ miles south east of Preston on the River Lostock on the road between Preston and Wigan. Cuerden Valley Park, south of the M6 and M65 junction, covers 650 acres, half of which is used for agriculture. The park has a lake and was once the estate of Cuerden Hall.

== See also ==
- Listed buildings in Cuerden
- St Saviour's Church, Cuerden
