= Whittle-le-Woods =

Village in Lancashire, England

Coordinates: 53.691°N 2.640°W

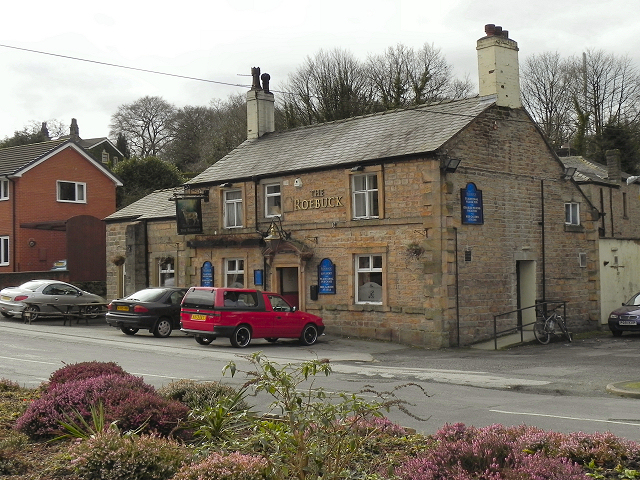
- The Roebuck public house

- Shown within Chorley Borough Location within Lancashire
- Population: 5,434 (2011 Census)
- Demonym: Whittler
- OS grid reference: SD577218
- Civil parish: Whittle-le-Woods
- District: Chorley
- Shire county: Lancashire
- Region: North West
- Country: England
- Sovereign state: United Kingdom
- Post town: CHORLEY
- Postcode district: PR6
- Dialling code: 01257; 01772
- Police: Lancashire
- Fire: Lancashire
- Ambulance: North West
- UK Parliament: Chorley

Whittle-le-Woods (commonly shortened to Whittle) is a village and civil parish of the Borough of Chorley in Lancashire, England. The population of the civil parish at the 2011 census was 5,434.

Whittle-le-Woods lies on the A6, about three miles north of the town of Chorley, and to the south of the city of Preston. It is divided into two areas, the older part on the old coach road running through Waterhouse Green to Brindle and the more modern part on the A6 road where the church of St John is situated. In the north east is St Chad's RC Church and off the A6 is Shaw Hill Hotel, Golf and Country Club centred on the Shaw Hill Georgian mansion.

It has experienced much residential development during the last twenty years. This has established the village as a popular commuter area, as it lies close to Preston and between the M6 and M61 motorways.

Just over a mile to the east of the M61 is the hamlet of Whittle Springs, location of a famous spa which was founded in 1836 and which thousands of people visited from across the country. The Leeds and Liverpool Canal passes a junction in the hamlet, where the south end of the Lancaster Canal formerly continued north to Walton Summit. This is also the start of a flight of locks called Johnson's Hillock Locks, which continue via Heapey and Wheelton in the direction of Blackburn.

Whittle is also known for fishing places, such as Lower Mill off Town Lane and Top Lock. Whittle has many public houses, and it is close to the Shaw Hill golf course on the A6.

== Toponymy ==
The village's name is attested from c. 1160 as Witul, deriving from the Old English hwit + hyll, meaning "white hill". The affix "-le-Woods" is a later addition, meaning "in the woodland".

== Population and demographics ==
At the 2011 census, the civil parish has a population of 5,434, more than double its 1901 population of 2,333. In terms of ethnic composition, the current population is 97.0% white, 1.1% mixed race, 1.4% Asian, 0.3% black, and 0.1% other ethnic groups.

== Notable people ==
- Willie McIver (1876–1934), footballer who played over 300 games, including for Blackburn Rovers
- Walter Crook (1913–1988), football player and manager; played 264 games, mainly for Blackburn Rovers
- Leo Baxendale (1930–2017), cartoonist and publisher including strips in The Beano & The Bash Street Kids

== History ==
Whittle was on the map due to its sandstone quarries, mainly two large quarries on Hill Top Lane. Whittle Hill Quarry is one of the deepest quarries in North West England. These were fed by the canal which took stone that had been excavated to Walton Summit and Wigan.

Shaw Hill was the 18th century home of the Crosse family.

In 1841, Lady Susanna Hoghton of Astley Hall gave the Tithebarn Croft for the benefit of local people in need.

=== Lancaster Canal Southern End ===
Whittle-le-Woods was home to the Walton Summit Branch, a small 3-mile (5 km) stretch of canal, which was supposed to be part of the complete Lancaster Canal between Kendal and Westhoughton, near Wigan. Although it was never completed the two parts (i.e. North Section and South Section) were linked with a 'temporary' tram road. The tram road survived, and the canal did not. Originally, the canal passed through the Whittle Hills, east of the village itself, via a long tunnel, engineered by John Rennie.

The tunnel collapsed in the 1830s and was later split into two tunnels, East and West. Between though as a deep cutting which famously in the 1960s, an engineer from the British Rail and Waterways museum commented "have no problems matching the Shropshire Union canal". The canal was last used in the 1930s, although teenagers navigated the canal days before it was to be destroyed by the M61. Most of the canals bridges and tunnels remain, although they are in a poor condition.

== See also ==
- Listed buildings in Whittle-le-Woods
