= Chorley Borough =

Chorley Borough may refer to:

- Two different rugby league teams which played at Chorley, Lancashire:
  - Blackpool Borough played as Chorley Borough in the 1988–89 season.
  - The side which became Chorley Lynx played as Chorley Borough from 1989 to 1995.
- The medieval borough of Chorley (13th century)
- The Municipal Borough of Chorley (1881–1974)
- The non-metropolitan Borough of Chorley, created in 1974
