= Chorley (disambiguation) =

Chorley is a town in Lancashire, England. It may also refer to

- Borough of Chorley, a local government district containing the town
- Chorley (UK Parliament constituency) containing the town

Chorley may also refer to:

== Places ==
- Chorley, Alderley, Cheshire, England
- Chorley, Cholmondeley, Cheshire, England
- Chorley, Shropshire, in the parish of Stottesdon, England
- Chorley, Staffordshire, in the parish of Farewell and Chorley, England

== Other uses ==
- Chorley (surname)
- Chorley F.C.

== See also ==
- Chorleywood, Hertfordshire, England
