= Coat of arms of Chorley =

English coats of arms

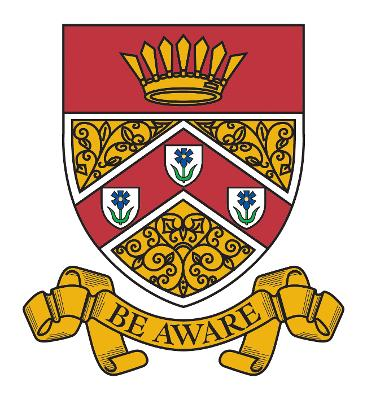
Arms of Borough of Chorley

The coat of arms of the Borough of Chorley was granted alongside borough status in 1882.

== History of arms in Chorley ==
Prior to borough status, the town was governed by Improvement Commissioners who used the arms of the Chorley family:

Blazon: Argent, a chevron gules between three blue bottles slipped azure.

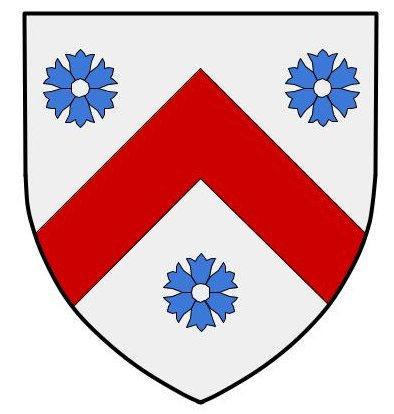
Recreated arms of the Chorley family

In 1881, Chorley became a borough. The next year an official Grant of Arms was made based on the old Commissioners' device:

Blazon;

Arms: Or on a Chevron Gules three Escochoens Argent each charged with a Blue Bottle slipped and leaved proper on a Chief of the second a Crown Vallery of the first

Motto:

1982 until 1988 - 'BEWARE'

1988 and onwards - 'BE AWARE'

The Chorley Rural District Council was officially granted arms on 28 April 1952

=== Blazon; ===
Arms: Argent on a Pale Sable between two Cornflowers stalked leaved and flowered proper a Standish between two Cross Crosslets of the field.

Crest: Out of a Coronet composed of eight Roses Gules barbed and seeded proper set upon a Rim Or a Mount Vert thereon a Bull Argent supporting a Beacon Sable fired proper.

Motto: 'SPECTEMUR AGENDO' - Let us be judged by our deeds.

Origin:

The cornflowers are from the arms of the Chorley family, as in the arms of the Borough of Chorley. The black pale represents the A6 trunk road which runs through the district, and the emblems on it stand for the local families of Standish and Charnock.

The red roses are for Lancashire and the mount and beacon represent Rivington Pike. The beacon supported by a white bull is from the heraldry of the de Hoghtons, and also alludes to farming.

Later the former Borough of Chorley, the Adlington Urban District, the Withnell Urban District and the Chorley Rural District were amalgamated into the current Borough of Chorley under its arms
