= Eccleston, Lancashire =

Village and civil parish in England

Coordinates: 53.647°N 2.726°W

Eccleston
- Village and civil parish
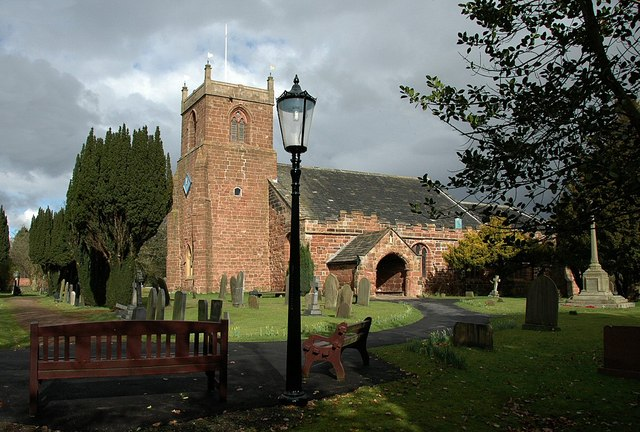
- St. Mary's Church, Eccleston (2009)

- Shown within Chorley Borough Location within Lancashire
- Population: 4,263 (2011 census)
- OS grid reference: SD521169
- Civil parish: Eccleston
- District: Chorley
- Shire county: Lancashire
- Region: North West
- Country: England
- Sovereign state: United Kingdom
- Post town: CHORLEY
- Postcode district: PR7
- Dialling code: 01257
- Police: Lancashire
- Fire: Lancashire
- Ambulance: North West
- UK Parliament: South Ribble

Eccleston is a village and civil parish of the Borough of Chorley in Lancashire, England. It is beside the River Yarrow, and was formerly an agricultural and later a weaving settlement.

== History ==
Its name came from the Celtic word "eglēs" meaning a church, and the Old English word "tūn" meaning a farmstead or settlement, i.e. a settlement by a Romano-British church. Evidence of the settlement dates back hundreds of years; St. Mary's Church dates back to the 14th century AD.

The village was mentioned in the Domesday Book of 1086, the book ordered by William the Conqueror, to detail all settlements and farms in England for the purpose of tax collection.

Ingrave Farm, located on the northern side of the River Yarrow, is built on a moated site of an earlier building thought to date from the medieval period. The partly waterlogged moat about is 15 metres (49 ft) wide and 2 metres (6 ft 7 in) deep in places. About 100 metres (330 ft) to the west is a smaller site about 25 metres (82 ft) square, the moat of which has since been infilled. It was linked to the larger moat by a still waterlogged channel.

Bradley Hall Farm on the eastern side of the village is also on a moated site of an earlier building, thought to be of similar age. Although partially infilled, the moat survives best on the south-east and north-east sides where its width is between 10 and 15 metres (33 and 49 ft) and depth of up to 2 metres (6 ft 7 in). Around the moat there are also three fishponds that were connected to it by water channels. The present farmhouse is excluded from the scheduled monument protection, but it is Grade II listed.

== Population ==
According to the 2011 United Kingdom census, the parish has a population of 4,263.

== Governance ==
Since 2010, Eccleston has been in the constituency of South Ribble for elections for Westminster. Before this, the village was in the constituency of Chorley.

Local government consists of councils at county, district and parish level. At district level, Eccleston is part of the three member Eccleston, Heskin and Charnock Richard ward of Chorley Council, created in 2021 it was previously part of a 3-member ward with Mawdesley From 2002-2021 and before that was combined with Heskin.

== Economy ==
In agrarian times the local speciality was fruit from orchards, few of which now remain. The more recent weaving industry has also passed, as the two local textile mills are now closed. The "Old Mill" building is now being used as an antique, collectable and nostalgia retail space called "Bygone Times".

The "New Mill" was converted into a small village shopping centre which was demolished entirely in 2015 and a new smaller shopping centre built with houses being built on the extra space. Consequently, the village has developed a more suburban role than some of its neighbours.

== Transport ==
The town is served by an hourly bus service to Wigan, Preston, Croston and Chorley (daytimes only) with more infrequent daytime services available to Southport and Ormskirk. The nearest railway stations are at Croston and Euxton Balshaw Lane.

== Education ==
The village has two schools, Eccleston St. Mary's Church of England Primary School and Eccleston Primary School.

== Religion ==
There are three churches in the village, the 14th Century St Mary the Virgin Church of England Church to the north of the village (until the reformation this was formerly the Catholic Church), constructed from distinctive Liverpool sandstone, similar to Euxton Parish Church, Eccleston Methodist Church and St Agnes Roman Catholic Church to the south.

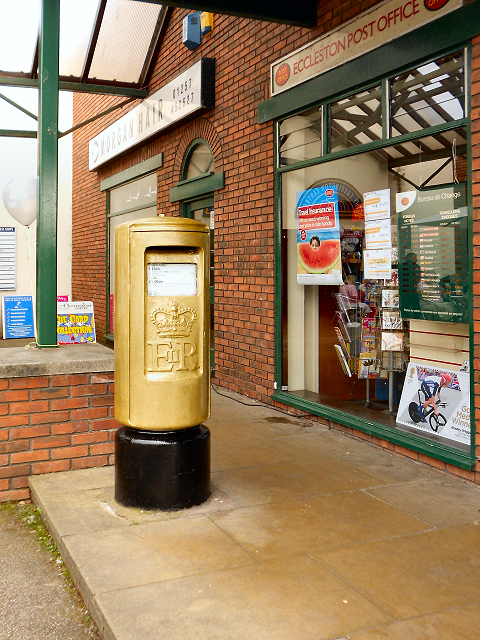
The post box painted gold to celebrate resident Bradley Wiggins' gold medal at the 2012 Summer Olympics

== Recreation ==
The village also has a popular children's play area situated adjacent to the football pitches, popularly known as "the rec", an abbreviation of recreation area.

== Notable people ==
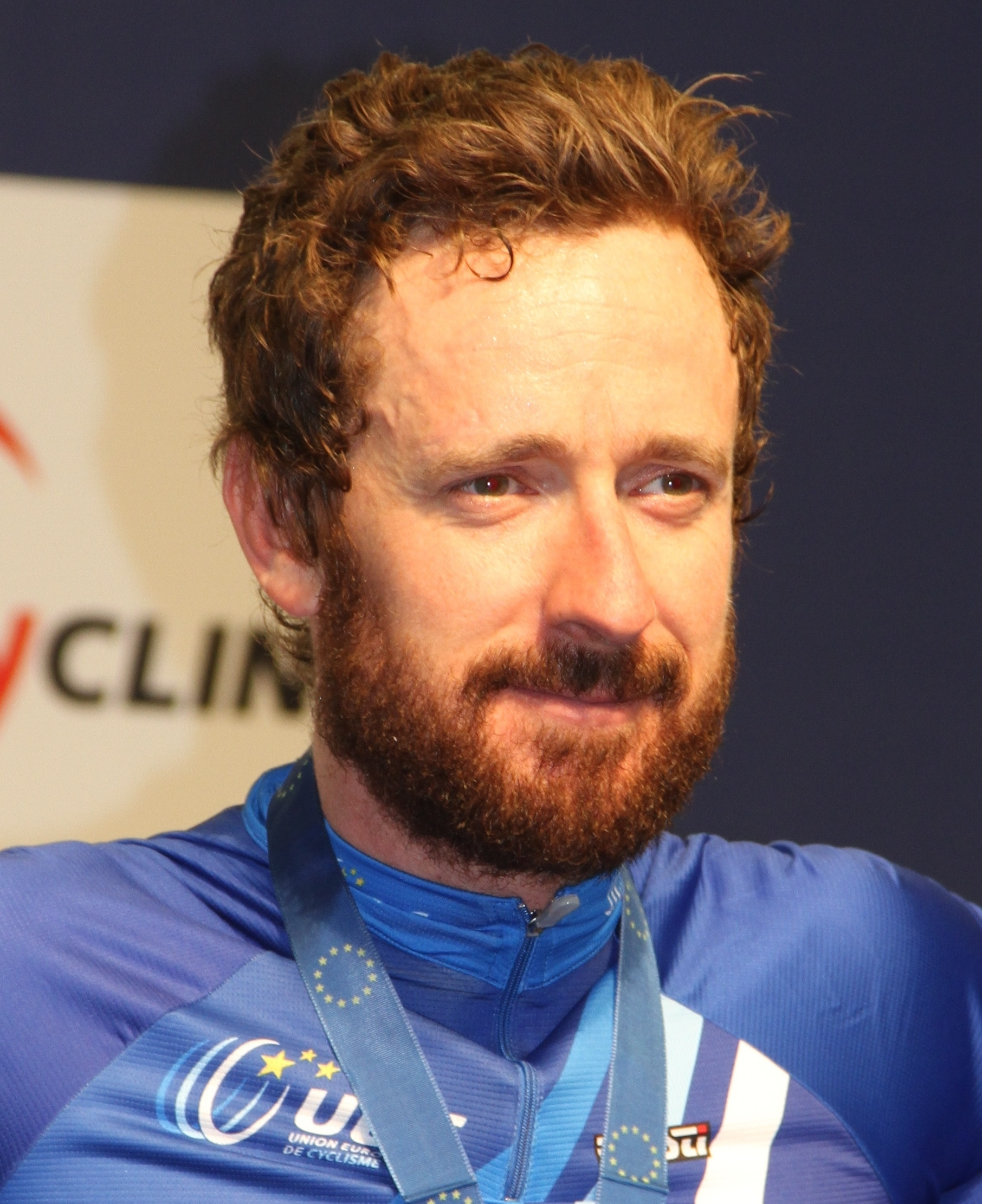
Bradley Wiggins, 2015

- Saint John Finch (c. 1548 - 1584), an English Roman Catholic farmer, became a martyr, beatified in 1929.
- Saint John Rigby (c. 1570 – 1600), an English Roman Catholic layman who became a martyr.
- Thomas Barrow (1747–1813), a British Jesuit, worked in Liège.

=== Sport ===
- David Makinson (born 1961), former cricketer who played 35 First-class cricket matches
- Paul McKenna (born 1977), former footballer, played over 530 games including 418 for Preston North End
- Sir Bradley Wiggins (born 1980), professional cyclist, competed professionally between 2001 and 2016.

== See also ==
- Listed buildings in Eccleston, Lancashire
- Scheduled monuments in Lancashire
