= Limbrick =

Limbrick is a surname. Notable people with the surname include:

- Anthony Limbrick (born 1983), Australian football coach
- David Limbrick, Australian politician
- Garrett Limbrick (born 1965), American football player
- Warren Limbrick, New Zealand Anglican dean

== See also ==
- Limbric, type of cloth
- Limbrick, Lancashire, hamlet
