= Iris Smith (disambiguation) =

Iris Smith is an American freestyle wrestler.

Iris Smith may also refer to:

- Iris Smith, Hunter character played by Cec Verrell
- Iris Smith, candidate in Chorley Council election, 2002
