= Listed buildings in Charnock Richard =

Charnock Richard is a civil parish in the Borough of Chorley, Lancashire, England. The parish contains 12 buildings that are recorded in the National Heritage List for England as designated listed buildings. Of these, two are listed at Grade II*, the middle grade, and the others are at Grade II, the lowest grade. Apart from the village of Charnock Richard, the parish is rural. Most of the listed buildings are, or originated as, farmhouses and farm buildings. The other listed buildings consist of a church, a bridge, a school and schoolmaster's house, and almshouses with associated buildings.

== Key ==
Grade	Criteria
II*	Particularly important buildings of more than special interest
II	Buildings of national importance and special interest

== Buildings ==
Name and location	Photograph	Date	Notes	Grade
Bolton Green Farmhouse; 53.65437°N 2.68034°W		1612	A sandstone house with a slate roof, it is in two storeys. The house has a roughly cruciform plan consisting of a three-bay main range with a porch at the front and a kitchen wing at the rear. The porch is gabled, in two storeys, and contains a doorway with a moulded surround, and a window above with a stepped hood mould and a datestone. The windows are mullioned. Inside are an inglenook, a bressumer and timber-framed partitions.	II*
Barn, Bolton Green Farm; 53.65432°N 2.68006°W	—	17th century (probable)	A sandstone barn with a stone-slate roof, later converted into a hall. It has a rectangular plan, in three bays, and with a south aisle. In the aisle wall are blocked ventilation slits, elsewhere are two doorways (one blocked), and two mullioned windows. The other openings have been altered.	II
Lower House Farmhouse; 53.64106°N 2.66796°W	—	1653	The former farmhouse is in brick with on a stone plinth, with stone quoins and dressings and a concrete tile roof. The house has two storeys and three bays with an outshut at the rear. On the front is a two-storey gabled porch with a moulded surround, a Tudor arched lintel, and a hood mould, above which is a datestone. Some of the windows are mullioned, others have altered glazing. Inside are back-to-back inglenook hearths with bressumers.	II*
Chisnall House; 53.62614°N 2.68682°W	—	Late 17th century	A former farmhouse in sandstone with a stone-slate roof. There are three bays, the first two bays having two storeys and the third bay a single storey. Above the doorway is a large lintel inscribed with letters in relief, now worn. The windows are mullioned, except for a sliding-sash window in the third bay. At the rear is a modern two-storey extension.	II
Tan House Farmhouse; 53.64587°N 2.67646°W	—	Before 1695	The farmhouse consists of two ranges at right angles built at different times. The roofs are partly in slate and partly in stone-slate. The older range is cruck-framed with brick cladding on a stone plinth. It has two storeys and two bays with an outshut at the rear. The later range, dated 1695, in brick with stone dressings, has 2 1/2 storeys and three bays. The windows are of mixed types. Inside the older part are two cruck trusses.	II
Gate piers and mounting block, Bolton Green Farm; 53.65410°N 2.68110°W	—	c. 1700	The pair of gate piers has been incorporated into a garden wall, They are in sandstone, square, and have moulded plinths and capitals with ball finials. The mounting block has four steps and stands on a concrete base.	II
Fisher House Farmhouse; 53.65224°N 2.68631°W	—	Early 18th century (probable)	A small farmhouse containing 17th-century materials in a ruinous condition. It is in sandstone, with a stone-slate roof, in two storeys and two bays. All the windows were mullioned.	II
Pincock Bridge; 53.65525°N 2.67640°W		18th century (or earlier)	The road bridge carries Pincock Brow over the River Yarrow. It was restored after a flood in 1837. The bridge is in sandstone and consists of a single low span that is slightly humped in the centre. It has pilastered abutments and rounded coping.	II
Boiler house, Bolton Green Farm; 53.65444°N 2.68012°W	—	18th century (probable)	Originating as a farm building, it is in sandstone with a slate roof. The building consists of a rectangular single cell in two storeys. It has a corner buttress, modern double doors, and a ventilation opening. Other openings have been blocked, including a mullioned window.	II
Christ Church; 53.63661°N 2.67732°W		1856–60	The church was designed by Edward Harrison, it has Perpendicular features, and is built in sandstone with roofs of blue and purple slate. It consists of a nave, a chancel with a polygonal apse, and a west tower. The tower has four stages, and contains a west doorway, a west window, and three clock faces. At the top is a battlemented parapet and prominent gargoyles. Inside the church is a scissors-braced hammerbeam roof.	II
School and master's house 53.63604°N 2.67403°W	—	1858	The building is in sandstone with slate roofs, it has a T-shaped plan, and is in Gothic style. The school is in a single storey and has four bays, with a bellcote on the east gable. Adjacent to the school is a privy house. At right angles to the school is a porch and the master's house. The latter has two storeys and two bays, with a gabled porch. The railings in front of the house are included in the listing.	II
Almhouses, house and chapel 53.63580°N 2.67367°W	—	1898	The buildings are all in sandstone with slate roofs, and in Gothic style. They include of a row of four single-storey almshouses, all under one roof, with a central gable containing a coat of arms. Each house has a gabled porch and mullioned windows. Attached to them by an arcaded screen is a former washhouse, and this is attached in a similar way to a matron's house incorporating a chapel with a bellcote.	II
