= Listed buildings in Eccleston, Lancashire =

Eccleston is a civil parish in the Borough of Chorley, Lancashire, England. The parish contains 16 buildings that are recorded in the National Heritage List for England as designated listed buildings. Of these, three are listed at Grade II*, the middle grade, and the others are at Grade II, the lowest grade. The parish contains the village of Eccleston, which is surrounded by agricultural land. Most of the listed buildings are houses, farmhouses (or houses that originated as farmhouses), and farm buildings. The other listed buildings are the parish church and structures in its churchyard, a public house, a former school, a bridge, and a former savings bank.

== Key ==
Grade	Criteria
II*	Particularly important buildings of more than special interest
II	Buildings of national importance and special interest

== Buildings ==
Name and location	Photograph	Date	Notes	Grade
Church of the Blessed Virgin Mary; 53.65485°N 2.73333°W		14th century	The oldest part of the church is the base of the tower, and there were later alterations, expansions, and restorations. It is built in sandstone with stone-slate roofs. The church consists of a nave, a south aisle, a chancel with a south chapel, and a west tower. The tower is in three stages, and has diagonal buttresses, louvred bell openings, a clock face, and a straight parapet with corner posts, each surmounted by a weathervane.	II*
Re-used Calvary cross slab 53.65474°N 2.73344°W		Medieval	The gritstone slab is carved with a Calvary cross on two steps and a large swaord. It was originally inside the Church of the Blessed Virgin Mary and was to the memory of an unknown man. The slab was re-used in the 18th century to commemorate John Rigby, who died in 1766.	II*
Manor House Farmhouse; 53.65269°N 2.73510°W	—	16th century (probable)	The farmhouse was enlarged in the 17th century. It is in brick on a stone plinth with stone dressings, all roughcast, and it has a stone-slate roof. The house is in two storeys and an attic, and has a T-shaped plan, consisting of a front two-bay range and a two-bay rear wing, with a lean-to kitchen in the angle. Many of the windows are mullioned. Inside is an inglenook fireplace, a bressumer, and timber-framed partitions.	II
Re-used ledger slab 53.65491°N 2.73283°W		1584	The sandstone slab was originally inside the Church of the Blessed Virgin Mary. It was re-used in 1812 and placed in the churchyard. The slab is incised with two full-length figures lying side by side, over which is a later inscription.	II*
Bradley Hall; 53.64903°N 2.71211°W	—	Early 17th century	A farmhouse that was much enlarged in the 19th century, it is stuccoed with stone quoins and plinth, and a slate roof. The house has two storeys, and is in a U-shaped plan, with a three-bay front range, and wings from the rear of the first and third bays. The windows are sashes, some of which are sliding sashes. The moated site on which the building stands is a scheduled monument.	II
Wood End Farmhouse; 53.64973°N 2.70705°W	—	17th century	The farmhouse, which was altered in the 19th century, is in stuccoed brick on a stone plinth, and has a slate roof. It is in an L-shaped plan, consisting of a two-bay range with a two-bay cross-wing on the left. The farmhouse has two storeys, and there is a porch in the angle of the wings. The windows are sashes, one of which is a sliding sash. Inside is an inglenook and a large bressumer.	II
102 and 104 Towngate; 53.65030°N 2.73118°W	—	1659	Originally a farmhouse, later converted into two dwellings, the building is in brick on a stone plinth with stone dressings and a slate roof. It has two storeys and a three-bay front with an added bay at the left. Between the original second and third bays is a two-storey gabled porch with an open doorway containing wooden benches. Above this is a large sandstone lintel inscribed with the date. The windows are sashes. The added left bay is pebbledashed, with a modern porch and windows.	II
Red House Farmhouse; 53.64466°N 2.73101°W	—	1673	The former farmhouse was extended in 1931. It is in brick, mainly pebbledashed and partly rendered, with a tiled roof. The house has two storeys, and has a three-bay main front, with a projecting gabled wing to the first bay, and a small bay to the left of this. On the front is a two-storey gabled porch containing wooden benches. Most of the windows are mullioned, and others are sliding sash windows.	II
Headstone; 53.65471°N 2.73334°W	—	1698	The headstone is in the churchyard of the Church of the Blessed Virgin Mary. It is in sandstone and is carved in relief with scrollwork and an inscription.	II
Parr Hall; 53.65027°N 2.72888°W	—	1721	Originally a farmhouse, later two houses, a wing was added at the rear in the 19th century, and the building was remodelled in 1934. It is in brick with sandstone dressings, and has a slate roof. The building formerly had three storeys that have been reduced to two storeys and an attic. It has a T-shaped plan, the front of the main range having two bays. On the front is a doorway with a semicircular canopy above which is a datestone. The windows contain altered glazing. The large rear wing has a flight of stone steps leading to a first-floor entrance.	II
Former cowhouse, Parr Hall; 53.65037°N 2.72941°W	—	Early 18th century	The cowhouse, later used as a shop, is in brick on a sandstone plinth and has a corrugated steel roof. Originally in two bays, a third bay was added later. On the east side are three segmental-headed doorways, two of which have been converted into windows, and there is a blocked loading door above. On the west side are three segmental-headed windows with ventilation slits above.	II
201 The Green; 53.64629°N 2.72583°W	—	Mid 18th century	Originally the farmhouse of Cook's Farm, later used as a house, it is in painted brick with a stone-slate roof. The house has two storeys and an L-shaped plan, with a symmetrical two-bay front range, an outshut to the rear, and a lean-to extension on the left. Most of the windows are casements, with sliding sash windows in the extension and the outshut.	II
Eccleston Bridge; 53.65450°N 2.73500°W		18th century	The bridge carries the B5250 road over the River Yarrow. It is built in sandstone and consists of a single segmental arch with voussoirs, keystones, pilasters, and plain parapets pointed in the centre.	II
Farmer's Arms public house and adjoining buildings 53.65003°N 2.73152°W		Mid 18th century	The buildings are in brick, the public house painted, with roofs of slate and stone-slate. The public house has two storeys and a two-bay front, with a lower two-storey extension to the right. To the left are former stables and cottages, also in two storeys. The windows are sashes.	II
Eccleston Old School; 53.64963°N 2.72966°W		1814	Originally a school, and later used as a parish hall, the building is in sandstone with a hipped slate roof, and is in Gothic style. It has a rectangular plan and two storeys. On the front are a doorway to the left and five casement windows, all with pointed arches. Also on the front is an inscribed plaque.	II
Bank House; 53.64969°N 2.72984°W	—	1849	Built as a savings bank, and later used as a house, it is in sandstone with a slate roof, and in Gothic style. It has two storeys and a symmetrical three-bay front. In the centre is a former doorway converted into a window, with an inscribed plaque above. The outer bays contain two-light windows with arched heads.	II
