= 2002 Chorley Borough Council election =

2002 UK local government election

Elections to Chorley Borough Council were held on 2 May 2002. The whole council was up for election with boundary changes since the last election in 2000 reducing the number of seats by one. The council stayed under no overall control.

After the election the composition of the council was:

Party	Seats	±
Labour	22	▼2
Conservative	16	▲1
Liberal Democrat	6	▼1
Independent	3	▲1

== Election result ==
Chorley local election result 2002
Party	Seats	Gains	Losses	Net gain/loss	Seats %	Votes %	Votes	+/−
Labour	22			▼2	46.8	45.1	48,637	
Conservative	16			▲1	34.0	34.2	36,881	
Liberal Democrats	6			▼1	12.8	13.3	14,309	
Independent	3			▲1	6.4	7.1	7,619	
UKIP	0			Steady	0.0	0.4	401	

== Ward results ==
=== Adlington and Anderton ===
Adlington and Anderton (3)
Party	Candidate	Votes	%	±%
Labour	✓ Catherine Hoyle	1,887	21.6	
Labour	✓ Michael Davies	1,580	18.1	
Labour	✓ Florence Mary Molyneux	1,413	16.2	
Conservative	Ivy Leigh	1,027	11.8	
Conservative	Betty Lawson	1,020	11.7	
Conservative	William Lawson	1,014	11.6	
Liberal Democrats	Philip William Pilling	795	9.1	
Turnout				

=== Astley and Buckshaw ===
Astley and Buckshaw (2)
Party	Candidate	Votes	%	±%
Labour	✓ Laura Jane Lennox	875	27.2	
Conservative	✓ Mark Perks	851	26.5	
Conservative	Patricia Mary Haughton	834	25.9	
Labour	Margaret Rose Fielden	656	20.4	
Turnout				

=== Brindle and Hoghton ===
Brindle and Hoghton
Party	Candidate	Votes	%	±%
Conservative	✓ David Dickinson	823	69.5	
Liberal Democrats	Stephen Charlesworth	182	15.4	
Labour	Beverley Gore	175	15.1	
Majority		641	54.1	
Turnout		1,184		

=== Chisnall ===
Chisnall (2)
Party	Candidate	Votes	%	±%
Conservative	✓ Harold Heaton	1,028	26.6	
Conservative	✓ Edward Malcolm Smith	699	18.1	
Labour	Jon Davies	594	15.3	
Labour	Margaret M. Lees	516	13.3	
Independent	Alan Samuel Cornwell	410	10.6	
Liberal Democrats	Glyn Jones	379	9.8	
Liberal Democrats	Linda Eubank	246	6.4	
Turnout				

=== Chorley East ===
Chorley East (3)
Party	Candidate	Votes	%	±%
Labour	✓ Raymond Parr	1,658	24.9	
Labour	✓ Patricia Mary Wilson	1,651	24.7	
Labour	✓ Terence Brown	1,536	23.0	
Independent	Melville Coombes	711	10.7	
Conservative	Jacqueline C. Bettney	596	8.9	
Liberal Democrats	Jean Mellor	521	7.8	
Turnout				

=== Chorley North East ===
Chorley North East (3)
Party	Candidate	Votes	%	±%
Labour	✓ Dennis Edgerley	1,624	23.1	
Labour	✓ Adrian Lowe	1,505	21.4	
Labour	✓ Keith Lowe	1,419	20.2	
Conservative	James Henry Fleming	795	11.3	
Conservative	Elvi Livesey	683	9.7	
Liberal Democrats	Eileen Anne Smith	640	8.7	
UKIP	John Graeme Frost	401	5.7	
Turnout				

=== Chorley North West ===
Chorley North West (3)
Party	Candidate	Votes	%	±%
Independent	✓ Ralph Snape	2,973	31.8	
Independent	✓ Joyce Snape	2,612	27.9	
Labour	✓ Robert Gordon Crabtree	1,161	12.4	
Conservative	Peter Malpas	1,011	10.8	
Liberal Democrats	Linda Norman	669	7.1	
Conservative	Peter William Higham	491	5.2	
Conservative	Elsie May Perks	449	4.8	
Turnout				

=== Chorley South East ===
Chorley South East (3)
Party	Candidate	Votes	%	±%
Labour	✓ Thomas McGowan	1,508	20.5	
Labour	✓ Anthony Stephen Holgate	1,377	18.7	
Labour	✓ Christopher Michael Snow	1,282	17.4	
Conservative	Geoffrey Goodspeed	959	13.0	
Conservative	Sheila Marsden	931	12.7	
Conservative	Barbara Ann Higham	788	10.7	
Liberal Democrats	David Porter	510	6.9	
Turnout				

=== Chorley South West ===
Chorley South West (3)
Party	Candidate	Votes	%	±%
Labour	✓ Roy Lees	1,522	26.4	
Labour	✓ Anthony Gee	1,498	26.0	
Labour	✓ John Gerard Wilson	1,457	25.3	
Conservative	Dorothy Livesey	657	11.4	
Conservative	Kevan George Haughton	632	11.9	
Turnout				

=== Clayton-le-Woods and Whittle-le-Woods ===
Clayton-le-Woods and Whittle-le-Woods (3)
Party	Candidate	Votes	%	±%
Conservative	✓ James Eric Bell	1,816	20.7	
Conservative	✓ John Philip Walker	1,466	16.7	
Conservative	✓ Nigel Harvey Baxter	1,418	16.2	
Labour	Sharon A. Gray	905	10.3	
Liberal Democrats	Glenda Charlesworth	869	9.9	
Liberal Democrats	Stuart Brian Harding	861	9.8	
Labour	Darren M. Woodruff	772	8.8	
Labour	George W. Harvey	673	7.7	
Turnout				

=== Clayton-le-Woods North ===
Clayton-le-Woods North (3)
Party	Candidate	Votes	%	±%
Liberal Democrats	✓ Peter George Buckley	909	11.9	
Liberal Democrats	✓ Stephen John Fenn	890	11.7	
Liberal Democrats	✓ William Richard Mellor	875	11.5	
Conservative	Roger William Livesey	871	11.4	
Conservative	Alan Cullens	869	11.4	
Labour	Jean Elizabeth Cronshaw	861	11.3	
Conservative	Magdalene Margaret Cullens	853	11.2	
Labour	James Freeman	795	10.4	
Labour	Anthony Holden	700	9.2	
Turnout				

=== Clayton-le-Woods West and Cuerden ===
Clayton-le-Woods West and Cuerden (2)
Party	Candidate	Votes	%	±%
Labour	✓ Lesley Elizabeth Brownlee	916	24.5	
Conservative	✓ Thomas Bedford	827	22.1	
Conservative	Samuel Andrew Chapman	790	21.1	
Labour	Edward Anthony Murphy	749	20.0	
Liberal Democrats	Gail Patricia Ormston	457	12.2	
Turnout				

=== Coppull ===
Coppull (3)
Party	Candidate	Votes	%	±%
Liberal Democrats	✓ Kenneth William Ball	1,570	18.8	
Liberal Democrats	✓ Stella Marie Walsh	1,503	18.0	
Liberal Democrats	✓ Patricia Cuerden	1,373	16.5	
Labour	Andrew Birchall	1,313	15.7	
Labour	John Murphy	1,294	15.5	
Labour	Peter Maddock	1,290	15.5	
Turnout				

=== Eccleston and Mawdesley ===
Eccleston and Mawdesley (3)
Party	Candidate	Votes	%	±%
Labour	✓ Alan Whittaker	1,798	21.0	
Conservative	✓ Michael Iddon	1,455	17.0	
Conservative	✓ Francis Culshaw	1,429	16.7	
Labour	Thomas Henry Titherington	1,400	16.4	
Conservative	Brian Twist	1,325	15.5	
Labour	Edward Vincent Forshaw	1,150	13.4	
Turnout				

=== Euxton North ===
Euxton North (2)
Party	Candidate	Votes	%	±%
Labour	✓ Thomas Gray	1,086	28.2	
Labour	✓ Daniel Peter Gee	989	25.7	
Conservative	Rosemary Russell	773	20.1	
Conservative	Gordon Marshall Alexander Mitchell	769	20.0	
Liberal Democrats	Mary Buckley	234	6.1	
Turnout				

=== Euxton South ===
Euxton South (2)
Party	Candidate	Votes	%	±%
Conservative	✓ Geoffrey Russell	1,053	26.9	
Conservative	✓ Peter Goldsworthy	1,036	25.5	
Labour	Mary Gray	965	24.7	
Labour	Marion Lowe	855	21.9	
Turnout				

=== Heath Charnock and Rivington ===
Heath Charnock and Rivington
Party	Candidate	Votes	%	±%
Conservative	✓ Mary Patricia Case	732	64.3	
Labour	June Molyneaux	407	35.7	
Majority		325	28.5	
Turnout		1,139		

=== Lostock ===
Lostock (2)
Party	Candidate	Votes	%	±%
Independent	✓ Margaret Ann Iddon	913	24.4	
Conservative	✓ Doreen Dickinson	894	23.9	
Labour	David Massam	836	22.3	
Conservative	George Anthony Rigby	691	18.5	
Labour	David C. Lloyd	409	10.9	
Turnout				

=== Pennine ===
Pennine
Party	Candidate	Votes	%	±%
Conservative	✓ Marie Elizabeth Gray	645	55.0	
Liberal Democrats	Janet Ross-Mills	350	29.8	
Labour	Peter Wilson	178	15.2	
Majority		295	25.2	
Turnout		1,173		

=== Wheelton and Withnell ===
Wheelton and Withnell (2)
Party	Candidate	Votes	%	±%
Conservative	✓ Iris Elaine Smith	1,137	30.1	
Labour	✓ Christopher Howard	884	23.4	
Conservative	Simon Parkinson	746	19.7	
Labour	Paul Anthony Lowe	514	13.6	
Liberal Democrats	Shelagh Graham	502	13.3	
Turnout				
