= Listed buildings in Heath Charnock =

Heath Charnock is a civil parish in the Borough of Chorley, Lancashire, England. The parish contains 18 buildings that are recorded in the National Heritage List for England as designated listed buildings. Of these, one is listed at Grade II*, the middle grade, and the others are at Grade II, the lowest grade. The parish is mainly rural, and most of the listed buildings are houses and associated structures, farmhouses and farm buildings. The Leeds and Liverpool Canal passes through the parish, and there are five listed buildings connected with this, four bridges and an aqueduct. The other listed structure is a milepost.

== Key ==
Grade	Criteria
II*	Particularly important buildings of more than special interest
II	Buildings of national importance and special interest

== Buildings ==
Name and location	Photograph	Date	Notes	Grade
Hall o' th' Hill; 53.63030°N 2.60163°W		Early to mid 17th century	A country house, later altered and used as a golf club house. It is in sandstone with a slate roof, is in three storeys, and has a symmetrical five-bay plan. The outer bays contain three-storey, five-sided bay windows with mullioned and transomed windows. Many of the other windows are mullioned. The central doorway has a moulded architrave. At the rear of the right end is a short staircase wing.	II*
Dill Hall; 53.63221°N 2.58179°W		17th century (probable)	Originally a farmhouse, later divided into two dwellings. They are in sandstone with roofs of slate and stone-slate, and have two storeys. Each house is in two bays, with extensions at the rear. Some of the windows are mullioned, and others are casements.	II
Holland Fold Farmhouse; 53.63624°N 2.60188°W	—	1680	A sandstone house with a stone slate roof, in two storeys with an attic. It has two bays, an outshut to the rear, and a barn attached at the left end. On the front is a porch with a round-headed arch and voussoirs. Most of the windows are mullioned. Inside the house is an inglenook, and between the house and barn is a timber-framed partition with wattle and daub infill.	II
Johnson's Farmhouse; 53.64833°N 2.59769°W		1684	A former farmhouse in stone with a concrete tiled roof, it has a long rectangular plan and incorporates a former barn under the same roof. It has two storeys, and on the south front is a datestone and windows, some of which are mullioned, and others are casements. Inside is some timber-framing.	II
Hallsworth Fold Farmhouse; 53.63643°N 2.59451°W	—	1698	The former farmhouse is in sandstone with roofs of slate and stone-slate. It has an L-shaped plan, the main range being the older, and the rear wing at the left dating from 1706. There are two storeys, and each range is in two bays. On the front is a two-storey gabled porch. There are two doorways with inscribed lintels, and the windows are mullioned. Inside is an inglenook and a bressumer.	II
Barn, Nightingale's Farm; 53.62169°N 2.61295°W	—	1705	The barn is in stone with a stone-slate roof. It has a rectangular plan of five bays, with concrete extensions at the ends. The openings include wagon doorways, other doorways, ventilation holes, and windows, some of which were formerly mullioned and others being modern inserts.	II
Barn, Shaw Place; 53.62564°N 2.58147°W	—	1705	A sandstone barn with a slate roof, in a rectangular plan of six bays. It contains a wagon entrance, doorways, windows, oval bull's eyes windows, and an owl hole.	II
Outbuilding, Johnson's Farm; 53.64832°N 2.59748°W	—	1716	The outbuilding is in stone with a concrete tiled roof. It has a square plan, is in a single cell, and has two storeys. In the west gabled end is a doorway on the ground floor and a blocked doorway in the upper floor. The east end contains a datestone, and on the north side are two slit openings.	II
Barn, Hall o' th' Hill Farm; 53.62981°N 2.60094°W		Early 18th century (probable)	The barn is in sandstone with a concrete tiled roof. It has a rectangular plan with six bays and an extension to the south. The barn contains ventilation slits, wagon entrances, doorways, and windows, some of which have been blocked or altered. On the apex of the west gable is a finial.	II
Building, Shaw Place; 53.62589°N 2.58201°W	—	Early 18th century (probable)	The sandstone building has a stone-slate roof, and is in a rectangular plan of seven bays with two storeys. The building contains doorways, windows, one of which is mullioned, oval bull's eyes windows, and a square pitching hole.	II
Gate piers, Shaw Place; 53.62603°N 2.58181°W	—	18th century	The two gate piers are in the garden wall. They are in stone, and consist of tall rusticated pillars with square caps and large ball finials.	II
Rawlinson House; 53.62873°N 2.59559°W	—	Late 18th century (probable)	A former farmhouse in sandstone with a stone-slate roof. It has two storeys, and is in two bays, with another bay added later to the left. Above the doorway is a segmental canopy and a datestone. The windows were originally mullioned and most have been replaced by casements.	II
Canal Aqueduct; 53.63495°N 2.61161°W		1790s	The aqueduct carries the Leeds and Liverpool Canal over the River Yarrow. It is in stone and consists of a single high elliptical arch, and has a moulded cornice, curved parapets, and sloping abutments.	II
Canal Bridge Number 71; 53.62240°N 2.61251°W		1790s (probable)	The bridge carries Rawlinson Lane over the Leeds and Liverpool Canal. It is in stone and consists of a single elliptical arch with a triple keystone. At the ends are buttressed piers, and the parapets have rounded coping.	II
Canal Bridge Number 72; 53.62678°N 2.61080°W		1790s (probable)	The bridge, also known as Idle Bridge, is an accommodation bridge over the Leeds and Liverpool Canal. It is in stone and consists of a single elliptical arch with a triple keystone. At the ends are buttressed piers, and the parapets have rounded coping.	II
Canal Bridge Number 73; 53.63336°N 2.61125°W		1790s (probable)	The bridge, also known as Giles' Bridge, carries a track leading to Bretter's Farm over the Leeds and Liverpool Canal. It is in stone and consists of a single high elliptical arch with a triple keystone. At the ends are buttressed piers. The parapets have rounded coping and simple railings.	II
Canal Bridge Number 74; 53.63572°N 2.61260°W		1790s (probable)	The bridge, also known as Winstanley, or Ridding, Bridge, is an accommodation bridge over the Leeds and Liverpool Canal. It is in stone and consists of a single elliptical arch. At the ends are buttressed piers, and the parapets have rounded coping.	II
Milepost; 53.62579°N 2.61934°W	—	1837	The milepost is in cast iron, and has a wide stem on a low fluted pillar that carries a rectangular panel with a segmental head. The head contains a crest and the word "DUXBURY", and it is surmounted by ball finials. Inscribed on the panel are the distances in miles to Wigan and to Chorley.	II
