= Bedford Corn Exchange =

Municipal building in Bedford, England

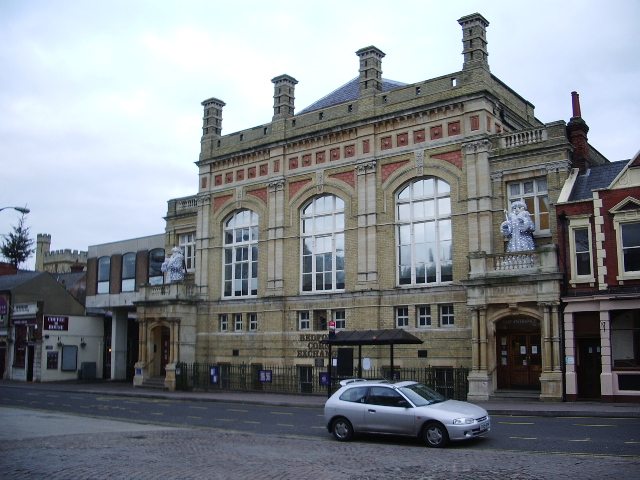
- Corn Exchange (front facade)

- Shown in Bedfordshire
- 52.1360°N 0.4674°W
- Location: St Paul's Square, Bedford

History
- Built: 1874

Site notes
- Architect(s): John Ladds and William Powell
- Architectural style: Italianate style

Listed Building – Grade II
- Official name: Bedford Corn Exchange
- Designated: 13 May 2022
- Reference no.: 1480129

The Corn Exchange is an events and concert venue located on St Paul's Square in the Castle area of Bedford, Bedfordshire, England. The structure, which was commissioned as a corn exchange, is a Grade II listed building.

== History ==
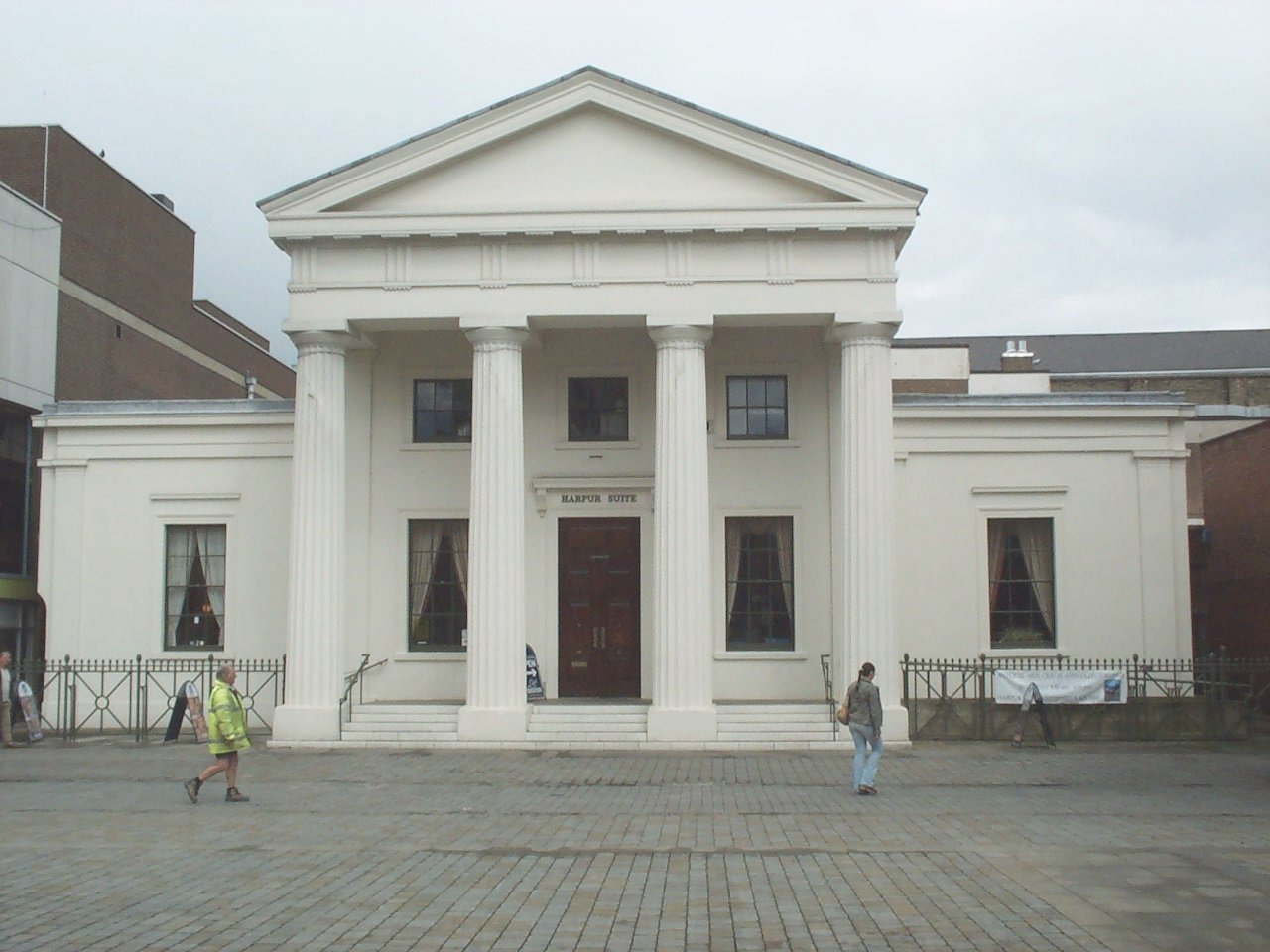
The Harpur Suite, part of the Corn Exchange complex since 1972

In the mid-1840s, a group of local businessmen decided to form a private company, known as the "Bedford Corn Exchange Company", to finance and commission a corn exchange for the town. The first corn exchange in Bedford, later referred to as the "Floral Hall", was located in the north-east corner of St Paul's Square and was opened on 1 May 1850. By the early 1870s, it was considered too small, and civic officials decided to commission a larger building. The company that had commissioned the first corn exchange was wound up at that time.

The foundation stone for the new building was laid by the Lord Lieutenant of Bedfordshire, Francis Cowper, 7th Earl Cowper, on 21 October 1872. It was designed by John Ladds and William Powell in the Italianate style, built in brick with stone dressings at a cost of £9,000 and was officially opened by Francis Russell, 9th Duke of Bedford on 15 April 1874. The design involved a symmetrical main frontage of five bays facing onto St Paul's Square. The central section, of three bays, which was slightly projected forward, was fenestrated with large segmentally headed windows with foliated keystones on the first floor. The bays were separated by pilasters with foliated capitals which supported a stone entablature which was decorated with terracotta panels. At roof level there was a modillioned cornice, a parapet and four chimney stacks. The outer bays featured porches formed by pairs of columns with scrolled capitals supporting entablatures bearing the words "corn exchange" and surmounted by balustraded parapets. The entrance bays, which were lower than the central section, were fenestrated by mullioned and transomed windows on the first floor, with cornices and balustraded parapets above. Internally, the principal room was the main double-height assembly hall.

The use of the building as a corn exchange declined significantly in the wake of the Great Depression of British Agriculture in the late 19th century. However, in the early 20th century, the building was re-purposed as an events and concert venue.

During the Second World War, the BBC Music and Religious Departments moved to Bedford when it became too dangerous for them to be based in London or their previous wartime home, Bristol. The BBC Symphony Orchestra used the building for public concerts between September 1941 and July 1945. The BBC Proms, which had been performed in The Queen's Hall in London until it was destroyed by bombs on 10 May 1941 and then operated from the Royal Albert Hall until that also became too dangerous, transferred to the Corn Exchange for the rest of the 1944 season. Performers at the Corn Exchange during the Second World War included Glenn Miller, Bing Crosby, Marlene Dietrich and Vera Lynn. The venue remained popular in the 1960s and performers at that time included the rock band, The Who, in September 1966.

Bedford's Assembly Rooms, which originally accommodated the General Library and Literary and Scientific Institute and are situated to the immediate northwest of the Corn Exchange, were integrated into the complex and re-named the Harpur Suite in 1972. A bust of Glenn Miller who, while serving with the American Band of the Supreme Headquarters Allied Expeditionary Force, broadcast from the building in July 1944 and then performed there again in August 1944, was designed by Patricia Finch and installed in a niche on the front of the building in 1994.

The Philharmonia Orchestra began a residency at the Corn Exchange in 1995. The building continues to be a major entertainment centre and performers at the venue for the Spring 2013 season included Marcus Brigstocke, Joe Calzaghe, Chas & Dave, The Drifters, Hawkwind, Lee Hurst, Jimeoin, Milton Jones, Russell Kane, Sean Lock, Showaddywaddy, and the Philharmonia Orchestra.

== See also ==
- Corn exchanges in England
- Bedford Civic Theatre
- University of Bedfordshire Theatre
