= William Henry Powell (architect) =

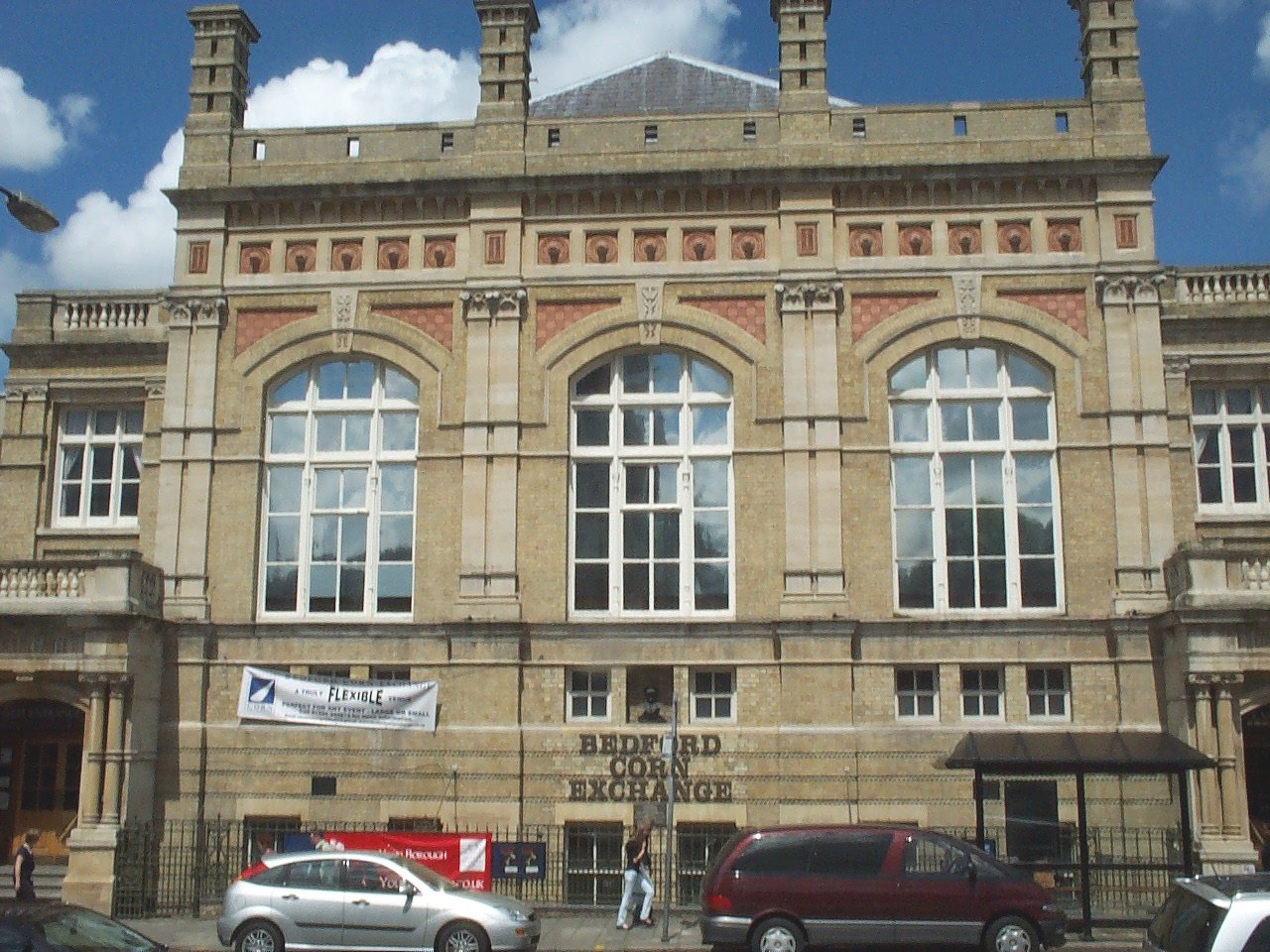
Corn Exchange, Bedford 1872-74

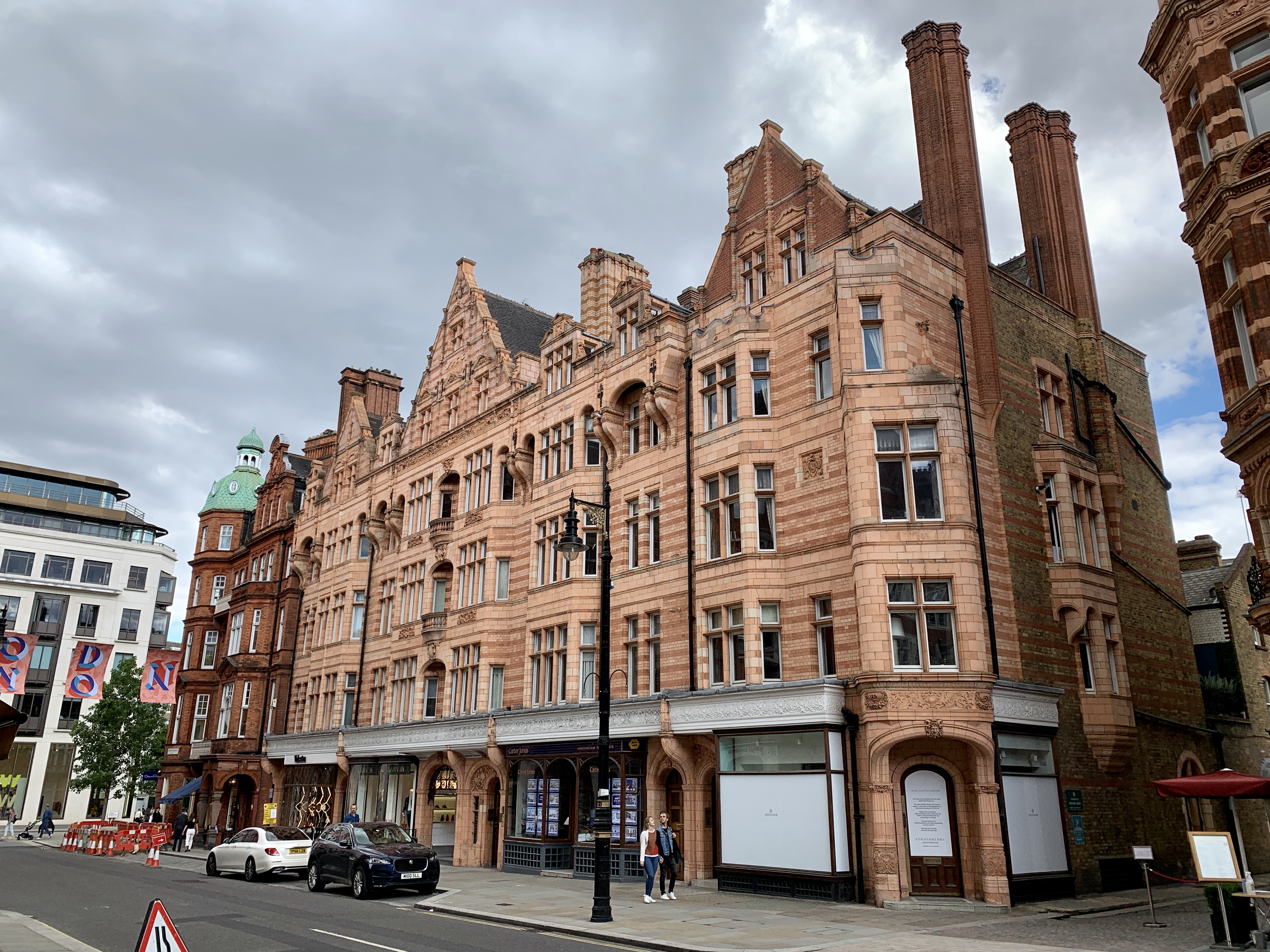
125 Mount Street, London 1886-87

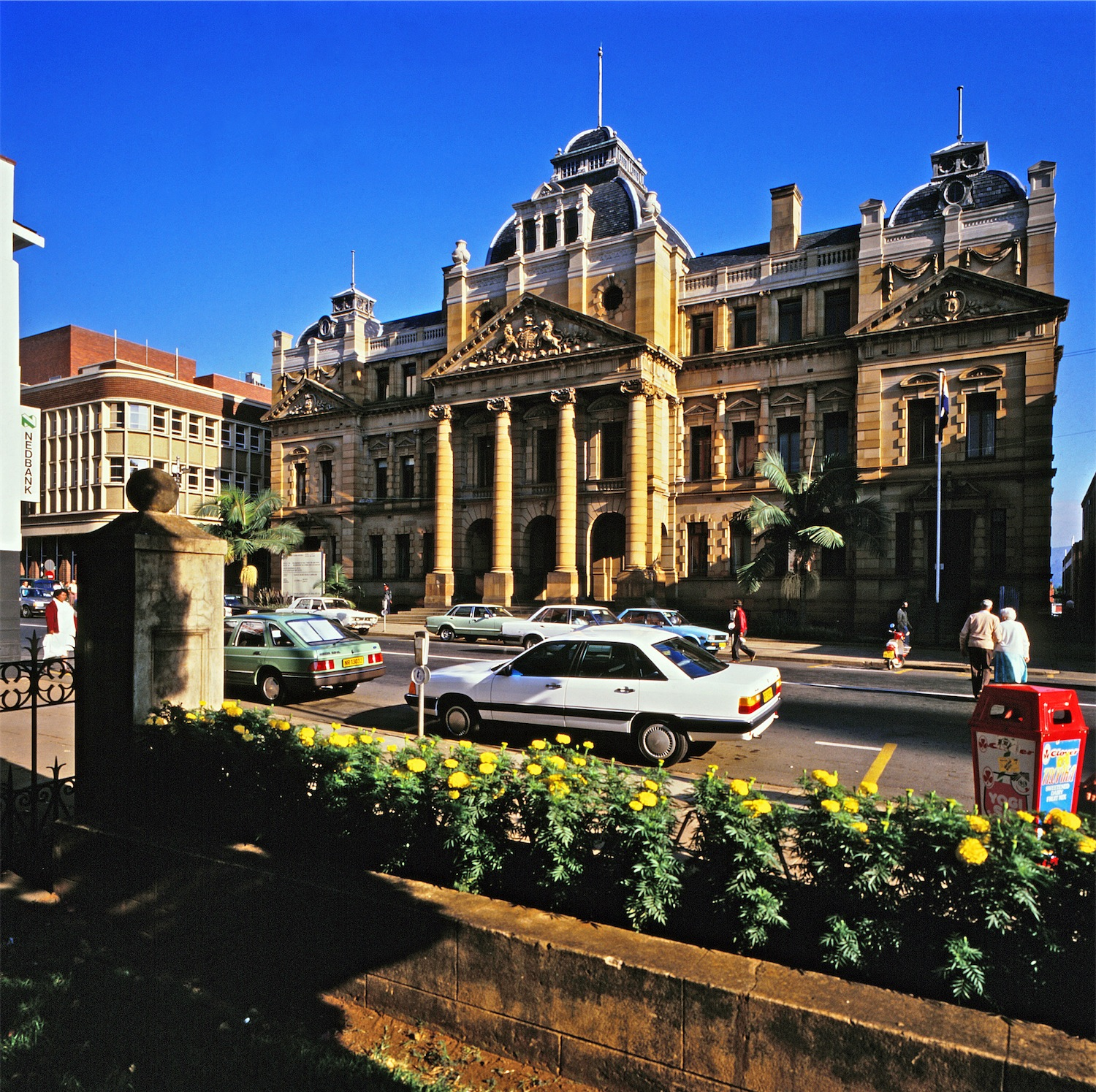
Old Colonial Building, Pietermaritzburg, South Africa 1897 - 1901

William Henry Powell FRIBA (1847 - 7 June 1900) was an architect primarily based in London and South Africa.

== Architectural career ==
He was articled to Joseph Gardner of Folkestone from 1864 to 1867 and remained as his assistant until he moved to be assistant to Sydney Smirke for one year. He later formed a partnership with John Ladds as Ladds and Powell which lasted until around 1890 when he emigrated to South Africa.

In South Africa he set up a practice in Durban. On his death in 1900, his eldest son William continued the practice in Durban.

He was nominated ARIBA in 1873 and FRIBA in 1887.

== Personal life ==
He was born in 1847 in Lewes, Sussex, the son of Revd. William Powell (b. 1810) and Matilda Spencer Blaine (1810 - 1891).

He married Clara Welch (1852 - 1920), daughter of J.D. Welch of Herne Hill on 23 April 1873 at St Paul's Church, Herne Hill, and they had five sons:

- William Powell (b. 1874)
- Sydney Powell (b. 1877)
- John Stewart Powell (b. 1885)
- Owen Powell (b. 1886)
- Norman Spencer Powell (b. 1893)

In 1889 he was cited in a divorce case by Ralph Thomas, a solicitor in practice in Chancery Lane on the grounds of his wife's adultery with Powell. To escape the ensuing scandal, in 1890 he moved with his family to Ridge Road, Morningside, Durban, South Africa.

== Works ==
- The Corn Exchange, Bedford 1872-74
- Chorley Town Hall, Lancashire 1875
- Terrace of shops and flats, 125-9 Mount Street, London 1886-87 Grade II listed
- Durban Club 1890
- Public Baths, Field Street, Durban 1891
- Durban High School 1894
- Victoria Club, Langalibalele Street, Durban, 1895
- Victoria Hall, Maritzburg College, 1897
- Old Colonial Building, Pietermaritzburg, South Africa 1897 - 1901
