= Thomas Barrow (Jesuit) =

- Born: 1747
- Died: 1813 (aged 65–66)

Thomas Barrow (1747–1813) was a British Jesuit.

== Life ==
Barrow was born at Eccleston near Chorley, Lancashire on 17 September 1747, and educated at St. Omer.

Barrow entered the Society of Jesus at Watten in 1764. After the temporary suppression of the society in 1773, he rendered great services to the new English Academy at Liège, and subsequently to Stonyhurst College.

At the peace of Amiens, Barrow was sent to Liège to look after the property of his brethren, as well as the interests of the nuns of the Holy Sepulchre (now settled at New Hall, Chelmsford). He died at Liège on 12 June 1813.

== Works ==
Dr. Oliver calls him a prodigy of learning, but the only published specimens of his erudition are two sets of verses in Hebrew and Greek, in honour, respectively, of the Prince-Bishop of Liège, François-Charles de Velbrück (1772), and François-Antoine-Marie de Méan, the last Prince-Bishopric of Liège (1792).
