= Charnock Richard =

Village in Lancashire, England

Coordinates: 53.634°N 2.674°W

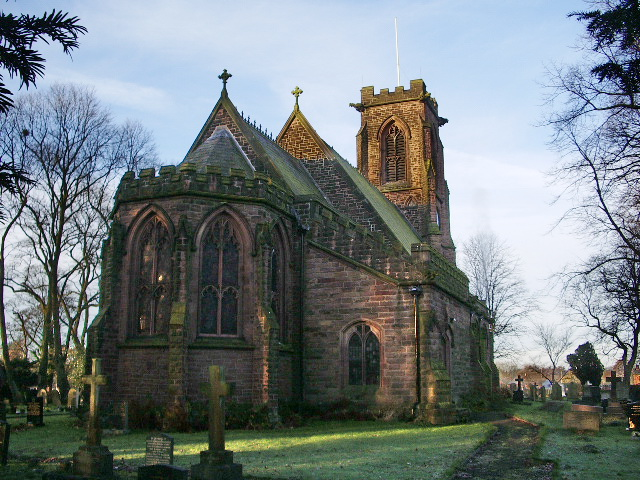
- Christ Church, Charnock Richard

- Shown within Chorley Borough Location within Lancashire
- Population: 1,800 (2021 Census)
- OS grid reference: SD555155
- Civil parish: Charnock Richard
- District: Chorley
- Shire county: Lancashire
- Region: North West
- Country: England
- Sovereign state: United Kingdom
- Post town: CHORLEY
- Postcode district: PR7
- Dialling code: 01257
- Police: Lancashire
- Fire: Lancashire
- Ambulance: North West
- UK Parliament: Chorley

Charnock Richard is a small village and civil parish in the Borough of Chorley, Lancashire, in England. The population of the civil parish taken at the 2011 census was 1,748.

== History ==
The village was named in the early 13th century by the local landowner who gave the township his first name of Richard, to distinguish it from neighbouring Heath Charnock. It is situated on the A49 road, which leads from Preston to Wigan.

The manor house, Park Hall, dates from the 10th century. It was the home of Henry de Lea who was beheaded, along with Adam Banastre, on Leyland Moor in 1315, after the abortive Banastre Rebellion.

== Local amenities ==
Charnock Richard services, probably the area's most famous landmark, is a motorway service area, between junctions 27 and 28 of the M6 motorway. It was the first service station on the M6 when it opened in 1963 and is operated by Welcome Break. Next to it stands the derelict Camelot Theme Park, which closed in November 2012 due to insufficient visitors and financial problems.

Charnock Richard Pasture is just off Freemans Lane, and is a Site of Special Scientific Interest. Christ Church, a church of the Church of England, was built in 1860.

== Sport ==
The village football club, Charnock Richard F.C., plays at Mossie Park on Charter Lane.

Charnock Richard Golf Club, which opened in 1994, was a parkland golf course on the main A49 Preston Road and is set in 140 acres (57 ha). It closed in July 2013, after being bought by businessman Dave Whelan.

== See also ==
- Listed buildings in Charnock Richard
