= 2026 Chorley Borough Council election =

2026 English local government election

- 7 May 2026

14 out of 42 seats to Chorley Borough Council 22 seats needed for a majority
- Registered: 88,469
- Turnout: 36,410; 41.2%
	First party	Second party	Third party
Leader	Alistair Bradley		Alan Platt
Party	Labour	Reform	Conservative
Last election	39 seats, 60.5%	Did not stand	3 seats, 26.8%
Seats before	36	1	4
Seats after	29	7	4
Seat change	▼8	▲7	Steady
	Fourth party	Fifth party
Party	Green	Independent
Last election	0 seats 10.0%	Did not stand
Seats before	0	1
Seats after	1	1
Seat change	▲1	Steady
- Results of the 2026 Chorley Council election
Leader before election
Alistair Bradley
Labour
Leader after election
Alistair Bradley
Labour

The 2026 Chorley Borough Council election took place on 7 May 2026 to elect members of Chorley Borough Council in Lancashire, England. This was on the same day as other local elections.

Labour retained overall control of the council, but with a reduced majority.

== Summary ==
=== Council composition ===
After 2024 election		Before 2026 election		After 2026 election	
Party	Seats	Party	Seats	Party	Seats
Labour	39	Labour	36	Labour	29
Conservative	3	Conservative	4	Conservative	4
Reform	0	Reform	1	Reform	7
Independent	0	Independent	1	Independent	1
Green	0	Green	0	Green	1

Changes 2024–2026:

- March 2025: Zara Khan (Labour) resigns – by-election held May 2025
- May 2025:
  - Martin Topp (Reform) gains by-election from Labour
  - Samantha Martin (Labour) resigns – by-election held June 2025
- June 2025: Aidy Riggott (Conservative) gains by-election from Labour
- February 2026: Chris Snow (Labour) suspended from party

=== Election result ===
2026 Chorley Borough Council election
Party	This election				Full council			This election		
Party	Candidates	Seats	Net	Seats %	Other	Total	Total %	Votes	Votes %	+/−
Labour	{{{candidates}}}	5	▼8	35.7%	24	29	69.0%	12,103	33.3%	▼27.2
Conservative	{{{candidates}}}	1	Steady	7.1%	3	4	9.5%	5,814	16.0%	▼10.8
Reform	{{{candidates}}}	7	▲7	50.0%	0	7	16.7%	13,048	35.9	New
Independent	{{{candidates}}}	0	Steady	0.0%	1	1	2.3%	21	0.1%	New
Green	{{{candidates}}}	1	▲1	7.1%	0	1	2.3%	4,662	12.8%	▲2.8
Liberal Democrats	{{{candidates}}}	0	Steady	0.0%	0	0	0.0%	612	1.6%	Steady
TUSC	{{{candidates}}}	0	Steady	0.0	0	0	0.0	54	0.1%	▼1.1

== Incumbents ==
Ward	Incumbent councillor	Party	Re-standing
Adlington & Anderton	June Molyneaux	Labour	Yes
Buckshaw & Whittle	Dedrah Moss	Labour	Yes
Chorley East	Martin Topp (Note: Elected at the 2025 Chorley East by-election.)	Reform	Yes
Chorley North & Astley	Alistair Morwood	Labour	Yes
Chorley North East	Jenny Whiffen	Labour	Yes
Chorley North West	Matthew Lynch	Labour	No
Chorley South East & Heath Charnock	Samir Khan	Labour	Yes
Chorley South West	Terry Howarth	Labour	Yes
Clayton East, Brindle & Hoghton	Michelle Beach	Labour	Yes
Clayton West & Cuerden	Neville Whitham	Labour	Yes
Coppull	Ryan Towers	Labour	No
Croston, Mawdesley & Euxton South	Alan Platt	Conservative	Yes
Eccleston, Heskin & Charnock Richard	Arjun Singh	Labour	Yes
Euxton	Tommy Gray	Labour	No

== Ward Results ==
=== Adlington & Anderton ===
Adlington & Anderton
Party	Candidate	Votes	%	±%
Labour Co-op	June Molyneux*	1,266	46.4	▼15.6
Reform	Graham Thornton	928	34.0	New
Conservative	Neil Baglow	280	10.3	▼22.1
Green	Amy Hardcastle	257	9.4	▲3.8
Majority		338	12.4	▼17.2
Turnout		2,731	45.0	▲8.3
Labour Co-op hold		Swing		

=== Buckshaw & Whittle ===
Buckshaw & Whittle
Party	Candidate	Votes	%	±%
Labour	Dedrah Moss*	824	32.1	▼15.8
Reform	Craig Tommony	781	30.4	New
Conservative	Christine Turner	589	22.9	▼18.9
Green	Rachel Smith	375	14.6	▲4.3
Majority		43	1.7	▼4.3
Turnout		2,569	35.1%	▲5.9
Registered electors				
Labour hold		Swing		

=== Chorley East ===
Chorley East
Party	Candidate	Votes	%	±%
Reform	Martin Topp*	778	39.7	New
Labour	Ian Cardwell	677	34.6	▼36.0
Green	Louise Hall	296	15.1	▲4.4
Conservative	Mark Grandi	171	8.7	▼9.9
TUSC	Carole Sasaki	37	1.9	New
Majority		101	5.1	N/A
Turnout		1,959	32.5	▲5.2
Reform gain from Labour		Swing		

=== Chorley North & Astley ===
Chorley North & Astley
Party	Candidate	Votes	%	±%
Reform	Mark Perks	944	39.3	New
Labour	Alistair Morwood*	820	34.2	▼24.4
Conservative	Jeffrey Green	327	13.6	▼17.0
Green	Jon Royle	310	12.9	▲2.1
Majority		124	5.1	N/A
Turnout		2,401	38.9	▲10.9
Registered electors				
Reform gain from Labour		Swing		

=== Chorley North East ===
Chorley North East
Party	Candidate	Votes	%	±%
Labour	Jen Whiffen*	1,470	51.3	▼19.5
Reform	Paul Hazzard	768	26.8	New
Conservative	Wendy Paterson	350	12.2	▼9.4
Green	Mark Tebbutt	214	7.5	▼0.1
Liberal Democrats	David Golden	64	2.2	New
Majority		702	24.5	▼5.0
Turnout		2,866	44.4	▲7.4
Registered electors				
Labour hold		Swing		

=== Chorley North West ===
Chorley North West
Party	Candidate	Votes	%	±%
Labour Co-op	Emma Walker	1,093	42.1	▼22.0
Reform	Shaz Malik	727	28.0	New
Conservative	Peter Malpas	403	15.5	▼7.7
Green	Anne Calderbank	375	14.4	▲4.2
Majority		366	14.1	▼13.0
Turnout		2,598	43.4	▲8.0
Registered electors				
Labour hold		Swing		

=== Chorley South East & Heath Charnock ===
Chorley South East & Heath Charnock
Party	Candidate	Votes	%	±%
Reform	Mark Hill	1,196	42.7	New
Labour	Samir Khan*	939	33.5	▼24.7
Green	Jane Weston	365	13.0	▲4.8
Conservative	Diana Khan	301	10.7	▼18.7
Majority		257	9.2	N/A
Turnout		2,801	41.03	▲11.0
Reform gain from Labour		Swing		

=== Chorley South West ===
Chorley South West
Party	Candidate	Votes	%	±%
Green	Olga Cash	866	39.7	▲5.6
Reform	Barry Young	774	35.5	New
Labour	Terry Howarth*	423	19.4	▼37.4
Conservative	Dorothy Livesey	120	5.5	▼3.6
Majority		92	4.2	N/A
Turnout		2,183	37.0	▲7.7
Green gain from Labour		Swing		

=== Clayton East, Brindle & Hoghton ===
Clayton East, Brindle & Hoghton
Party	Candidate	Votes	%	±%
Reform	Ellie Close	1,017	39.7	New
Labour	Michelle Beach*	717	28.0	▼18.5
Conservative	Greg Morgan	400	15.6	▼28.8
Green	Amy Coxley	263	10.3	▲1.2
Liberal Democrats	Stephen Fenn	149	5.8	New
TUSC	Geoff Fielden	17	0.7	New
Majority		300	11.7	N/A
Turnout		2,563	37.8	▲4.7
Reform gain from Labour		Swing		

=== Clayton West & Cuerden ===
Clayton West & Cuerden
Party	Candidate	Votes	%	±%
Reform	Lesley Durose	1,153	38.8	New
Labour	Neville Whitham*	989	33.3	▼29.8
Conservative	Sam Chapman	477	16.1	▼8.8
Green	Simon Cash	233	7.8	▲0.1
Liberal Democrats	Alexandrea Simpson	115	3.8	▼0.5
Majority		164	5.5	N/A
Turnout		2,967	43.1	▲11.4
Registered electors				
Reform gain from Labour		Swing		

=== Coppull ===
Coppull
Party	Candidate	Votes	%	±%
Reform	Joe McCartney	1,057	47.3	New
Labour	Steve Holgate	520	23.3	▼47.8
Green	Debbie Brotherton	421	18.8	▲10.7
Conservative	Harold Heaton	162	7.3	▼13.5
Liberal Democrats	Mark Frost	71	3.2	New
Majority		537	24.1	N/A
Turnout		2,231	35.3	▲11.9
Registered electors				
Reform gain from Labour		Swing		

=== Croston, Mawdesley & Euxton South ===
Croston, Mawdesley & Euxton South
Party	Candidate	Votes	%	±%
Conservative	Alan Platt*	1,207	39.2	▼5.7
Reform	Mark Wade	997	32.4	New
Labour Co-op	Caroline Turner	462	15.0	▼26.3
Green	Josh Collins	264	8.6	▼0.3
Liberal Democrats	John Wright	127	4.1	▼0.7
Independent	Barrie Duckworth	21	0.6	New
Majority		210	6.8	▲3.2
Turnout		3,078	49.5	▲14.6
Registered electors				
Conservative hold		Swing		

=== Eccleston, Heskin & Charnock Richard ===
Eccleston, Heskin & Charnock Richard
Party	Candidate	Votes	%	±%
Labour	Arjun Singh*	997	36.6	▼26.6
Reform	Fred Laithwaite	950	34.9	New
Conservative	Ethan Howarth	558	20.5	▼7.9
Green	Sef Churchill	127	4.6	▼0.4
Liberal Democrats	Rowan Power	86	3.1	▼0.3
Majority		47	1.7	▼33.0
Turnout		2,718	46.8	▲14.3
Registered electors				
Labour hold		Swing		

=== Euxton ===
Euxton
Party	Candidate	Votes	%	±%
Reform	Jonathan Close	978	36.9	New
Labour	Gillian Sharples	906	34.2	▼27.8
Conservative	Geoff Turner	469	17.7	▼14.4
Green	Pauline Summers	296	11.2	▲5.3
Majority		72	2.7	N/A
Turnout		2,649	43.1	▲3.9
Reform gain from Labour		Swing		
