= David Makinson (cricketer) =

English cricketer (born 1961)

Personal information
- Full name: David John Makinson
- Born: 12 January 1961 (age 65); Eccleston, Lancashire, England
- Batting: Right-handed
- Bowling: Left-arm fast-medium

Domestic team information
- Years: Team
- 1989–1996: Cheshire
- 1984–1988: Lancashire

Career statistics
Competition	First-class	List A
Matches	35	52
Runs scored	486	118
Batting average	22.09	9.83
100s/50s	–/1	–/–
Top score	58*	23
Balls bowled	4,849	2,215
Wickets	70	50
Bowling average	35.51	33.98
5 wickets in innings	1	–
10 wickets in match	–	–
Best bowling	5/60	4/28
Catches/stumpings	10/–	7/–
- Source: Cricinfo, 5 December 2011

David John Makinson (born 12 January 1961) is a former English cricketer who played in first-class and List A matches for Lancashire. He also appeared in List A matches for Cumberland. He now plays for Leyland Cricket Club. Makinson was a right-handed batsman who bowled left-arm fast-medium. He was born in Eccleston, Lancashire.
