= Chorley Town Hall =

Municipal building in Chorley, Lancashire, England

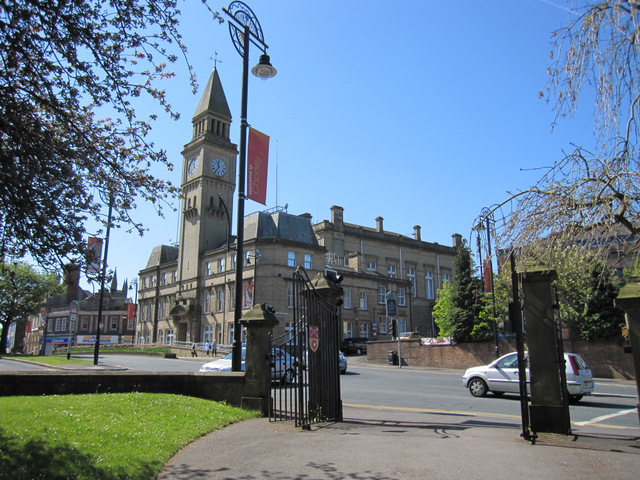
- Chorley Town Hall from St Laurence's churchyard

- Location in Lancashire Location in Chorley Borough
- 53.6540°N 2.6332°W
- Location: Chorley

History
- Built: 1879

Site notes
- Architect(s): John Ladds and William Henry Powell
- Architectural style: Italianate style

Chorley Town Hall is a municipal building in Market Street in Chorley, Lancashire, England.

== History ==
The first town hall, which was commissioned by a local mercer and philanthropist, John Hollinshead of Hollinshead Hall, was built on the east side of Market Street and completed in 1802. It accommodated the local public offices as well as the local lock-up. After the first town hall became too cramped, civic leaders decided to procure a new town hall: the site they selected on the west side of Market Street had been occupied by the Gillibrand Arms Public House.

The new building, which was designed in the Italianate style by John Ladds and William Henry Powell, was completed in 1879. The design involved a symmetrical main frontage with five bays facing onto Market Street with the end bays slightly projected forward; the central section, which also slightly projected forward, featured a doorway on the ground floor with brackets supporting a pediment containing a carved tympanum with a tall clock tower above (the clock and bells were by Gillett, Bland & Co.); there were sash windows on the first and second floors. The principal rooms were a large assembly hall, which later became known as the Lancastrian Room, the council chamber and town clerk's office.

The town hall became the headquarters of the new Municipal Borough of Chorley in 1881. In the early years the basement was used for a butter market and, in the early 20th century, the assembly room was used as a cinema. Meanwhile the old town hall was demolished in the 1930s. The building remained the local seat of government when the enlarged Borough of Chorley was formed in 1974. In the 1980s, a control centre was established in the basement for the protection of civic leaders in the event of a nuclear attack. Although most council officers and their departments relocated to the Civic Offices in Union Street in the late 20th century, council meetings continued to be held in the town hall.

An extensive programme of refurbishment works at the town hall was completed in 2005. The works, which were designed by Seed Architects, involved re-instatement of the main entrance under the clock tower and the creation of a glass-roofed atrium with glass passenger lifts to facilitate easy movement of customers within the building. After several incidents involving damage to facilities and abuse of staff, the Lancastrian Room ceased to be available for private hire in 2009.
