= 2021 Chorley Borough Council election =

2021 UK local government election

- 6 May 2021

42 out of 42 seats to Chorley Borough Council 22 seats needed for a majority
	First party	Second party
Leader	Alistair Bradley	John Walker
Party	Labour	Conservative
Seats before	37	8
Seats after	29	13
Seat change	▼6	▲5
Popular vote	43,115	34,515
Percentage	49.3%	39.5%
Swing	▼3.3%	▲3.4%
- The winner of each seat in the 2021 Chorley Borough Council election
Leader before election
Alistair Bradley
Labour
Leader after election
Alistair Bradley
Labour

Council elections for the Borough of Chorley were held on 6 May 2021 as part of the 2021 United Kingdom local elections.

Due to new boundaries for the district, all wards elected three councillors at this election before returning to its normal cycle of electing a third of councillors each year.

The result was a hold for the ruling Labour group.

== Results summary ==
The results of the 2021 elections are summarised below.

2021 Chorley Borough Council election
Party	This election			Full council			This election		
Party	Seats	Net	Seats %	Other	Total	Total %	Votes	Votes %	+/−
Labour	29	▼3	69.05	29	29	69.04	43,115	49.3	-3.3
Conservative	13	▲3	30.95	13	13	30.95	34,515	39.5	+3.4
Green	0	Steady	0.00	0	0	0.00	6,051	6.9	+3.1
Liberal Democrats	0	Steady	0.00	0	0	0.00	1,808	2.1	-2.3
Independent	0	▼2	0.00	0	0	0.00	1,768	2.0	+2.0

== Ward results ==
=== Adlington & Anderton ===
Adlington & Anderton
Party	Candidate	Votes	%	±%
Labour	Kim Snape	1,436	59.6	
Labour	Peter Francis Wilson	1,232	51.1	
Labour	June Molyneaux	1,205	50.0	
Conservative	Jeffrey Johnstone Green	795	33.0	
Conservative	Neil Gardiner Baglow	790	32.8	
Conservative	Paul Edward Lowe	738	30.6	
Green	Sally Felton	237	9.8	
Liberal Democrats	Phillip William Pilling	167	6.9	
Majority				
Turnout		2,409	39.12	
Labour win (new seat)				
Labour win (new seat)				
Labour win (new seat)				

=== Buckshaw & Whittle ===
Buckshaw & Whittle
Party	Candidate	Votes	%	±%
Conservative	Aidy Riggott	1,039	46.4	
Conservative	John Phillip Walker	941	42.0	
Conservative	Christine Turner	869	38.8	
Labour	Dedrah Cecilia Moss	837	37.4	
Labour	Fiona Mary Gibson	753	33.6	
Labour	Michelle Le Marinel	677	30.2	
Green	Rachel Smith	256	11.4	
Independent	Stuart Anthony Clewlow	255	11.4	
Liberal Democrats	Gail Patricia Ormston	139	6.2	
Liberal Democrats	David Golden	112	5.0	
Liberal Democrats	Rowan Patrick Power	56	2.5	
Independent	Darrell Fisher Dunn	50	2.2	
Majority				
Turnout		2,240	32.46	
Conservative win (new seat)				
Conservative win (new seat)				
Conservative win (new seat)				

=== Chorley East ===
Chorley East
Party	Candidate	Votes	%	±%
Labour	Hasina Khan	1,070	60.6	
Labour	James Steven Nevett	1,066	60.3	
Labour	Zara Khan	992	56.1	
Conservative	Marie Elizabeth Gray	409	23.1	
Conservative	Patricia Mary Houghton	386	21.8	
Conservative	Sandra Mercer	360	20.4	
Green	Carl Antony Nuttall	227	12.8	
Majority				
Turnout		1,767	29.15	
Labour win (new seat)				
Labour win (new seat)				
Labour win (new seat)				

=== Chorley North & Astley ===
Chorley North & Astley
Party	Candidate	Votes	%	±%
Labour	Adrian Lowe	1,054	48.5	
Labour	Jean Margaret Sherwood	953	43.9	
Labour	Alistair William Morwood	899	41.4	
Conservative	Grep Chapman	736	33.9	
Conservative	James Andrew Siswick	710	32.7	
Conservative	Stuart Jamieson	694	31.9	
Independent	Mark Perks	359	16.5	
Green	Kath Becker	332	15.3	
Majority				
Turnout		2,173	36.01	
Labour win (new seat)				
Labour win (new seat)				
Labour win (new seat)				

=== Chorley North East ===
Chorley North East
Party	Candidate	Votes	%	±%
Labour	Margaret Mary France	1,513	55.4	
Labour	Gordon France	1,375	50.3	
Labour	Jenny Whiffen	1,137	41.6	
Conservative	Peter Malpas	1,036	37.9	
Conservative	Clive Tattum	937	34.3	
Conservative	Greg Morgan	933	34.2	
Green	Finty Maye Royle	309	11.3	
Green	Jon Royle	239	8.8	
Majority				
Turnout		2,731	49.27	
Labour win (new seat)				
Labour win (new seat)				
Labour win (new seat)				

=== Chorley North West ===
Chorley North West
Party	Candidate	Votes	%	±%
Labour	Aaron Beaver	1,352	55.0	
Labour	Sarah Elizabeth Jane Ainsworth	1,338	54.5	
Labour	Matthew John Lynch	1,143	46.5	
Conservative	Carole Margaret Billouin	732	29.8	
Conservative	Geoffrey Turner	707	28.8	
Conservative	Mick Muncaster	702	28.6	
Green	Nicola Adshead	320	13.0	
Green	Anne Frances Calderbank	286	11.6	
Green	Mark Worsley Tebbutt	213	8.7	
Majority				
Turnout		2,456	41.37	
Labour win (new seat)				
Labour win (new seat)				
Labour win (new seat)				

=== Chorley South East & Heath Charnock ===
Chorley South East & Heath Charnock
Party	Candidate	Votes	%	±%
Labour	Alistair Ward Bradley	1,346	57.6	
Labour	Bev Murray	1,103	47.2	
Labour	Samir Kahn	938	40.2	
Conservative	Ryan Anthony Kevin Grogan	817	35.0	
Conservative	Gillian Jamieson	771	33.0	
Conservative	Craig Southern	624	26.7	
Green	Eileen Larysa Hathaway	233	10.0	
Green	Emma Jayne Kilburn	226	9.7	
Green	Martin James Hathaway	182	7.8	
TUSC	Jenny Hurley	152	6.5	
Majority				
Turnout		2,336	35.00	
Labour win (new seat)				
Labour win (new seat)				
Labour win (new seat)				

=== Chorley South West ===
Chorley South West
Party	Candidate	Votes	%	±%
Labour	Karen Margaret Derbyshire	951	52.3	
Labour	Roy Lees	942	51.8	
Labour	Terry Howarth	875	48.2	
Conservative	Kevin Michael Brown	382	21.0	
Green	Andy Hunter-Rossall	380	20.9	
Conservative	Susan Margaret Morris	377	20.7	
Green	Olga Maria Gomez-Cash	350	19.3	
Green	Jane Elizabeth Weston	342	18.8	
Conservative	Martin Andrew Topp	336	18.5	
Majority				
Turnout		1,817	33.33	
Labour win (new seat)				
Labour win (new seat)				
Labour win (new seat)				

=== Clayton East, Brindle & Hoghton ===
Clayton East, Brindle & Hoghton
Party	Candidate	Votes	%	±%
Conservative	Alan Cullens	948	38.7	
Conservative	Sam Chapman	925	37.8	
Labour	Peter Alexander Gabbott Peter	842	34.4	
Conservative	Marie Walker	823	33.6	
Labour	Ann Elizabeth Harrison	703	28.7	
Independent	Steve Williams	579	23.7	
Labour	Ryan Lee James Quick	564	23.0	
Independent	Mike Graham	525	21.5	
Green	Jackie Robinson	292	11.9	
Liberal Democrats	Stephen John Fenn	234	9.6	
Majority				
Turnout		2,447	35.70	
Conservative win (new seat)				
Conservative win (new seat)				
Labour win (new seat)				

=== Clayton West & Cuerden ===
Clayton West & Cuerden
Party	Candidate	Votes	%	±%
Labour	Mark Clifford	1,415	51.2	
Conservative	Magdalene Margaret Cullens	1,098	39.7	
Conservative	William Simmance	1,052	38.1	
Conservative	Jocelyn Mary Morgan	1,050	38.0	
Labour	Yvonne Marie Hargreaves	957	34.6	
Labour	Neville Grant Whitman	852	30.8	
Green	Clare Elizabeth Hales	379	13.7	
Green	Robert Stewart Wade	270	9.8	
Liberal Democrats	Glenda Charlesworth	230	8.3	
Liberal Democrats	Richard Llewellyn Chandler-Jones	107	3.9	
Majority				
Turnout		2,763	42.15	
Labour win (new seat)				
Conservative win (new seat)				
Conservative win (new seat)				

=== Coppull ===
Coppull
Party	Candidate	Votes	%	±%
Labour	Alex Martin Hilton	1,127	58.8	
Labour	Julia Louise Berry	1,110	57.9	
Labour	Steve Holgate	1,047	54.6	
Conservative	Paul Leadbetter	566	29.5	
Conservative	Valerie Marie Caunce	508	26.5	
Conservative	Scott Henry Caunce	505	26.3	
Green	Catherine Frances Hunter-Rossall	159	8.3	
Majority				
Turnout		1,917	31.35	
Labour win (new seat)				
Labour win (new seat)				
Labour win (new seat)				

=== Croston, Mawdesley & Euxton South ===
Croston, Mawdesley & Euxton South
Party	Candidate	Votes	%	±%
Conservative	Keith Iddon	1,555	55.8	
Conservative	Martin William Boardman	1,346	48.3	
Conservative	Alan John Platt	1,307	46.9	
Labour	Caroline Elizabeth Turner	786	28.2	
Labour	Paul Mark Sloan	715	25.7	
Labour	Pam Sloan	669	24.0	
Liberal Democrats	John Patrick Wright	416	14.9	
Green	John Clare	339	12.2	
Majority				
Turnout		2,785	44.78	
Conservative win (new seat)				

=== Eccleston, Heskin & Charnock Richard ===
Eccleston, Heskin & Charnock Richard
Party	Candidate	Votes	%	±%
Labour	Alan Whittaker	1,294	51.1	
Conservative	Harold Heaton	1,073	42.4	
Conservative	John Derek Dalton	941	37.2	
Labour	Martin John Fisher	893	35.3	
Conservative	Andrew Quickfall	820	32.4	
Labour	Gillian Frances Sharples	719	28.4	
Green	Dominique Clare	267	10.6	
Liberal Democrats	Mark Robert Frost	214	8.5	
Majority				
Turnout		2,530	43.80	
Labour win (new seat)				
Conservative win (new seat)				
Conservative win (new seat)				

=== Euxton ===
Euxton
Party	Candidate	Votes	%	±%
Labour	Danny Gee	1,186	47.8	
Conservative	Debra Platt	1,171	47.2	
Labour	Tommy Gray	1,080	43.5	
Conservative	Philip Preston	1,018	41.0	
Conservative	Rosemary Russell	988	39.8	
Labour	Catherine Ann Donegan	969	39.0	
Green	Richard Taylor Kilburn	213	8.6	
Liberal Democrats	Diane Elizabeth Curtis	133	5.4	
Majority				
Turnout		2,482	41.88	
Labour win (new seat)				
Conservative win (new seat)				
Labour win (new seat)				
