= John Ladds =

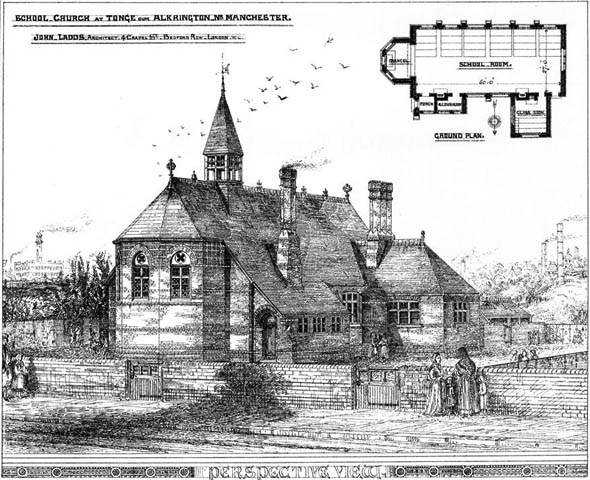
Ladds' design for the church school in Alkrington

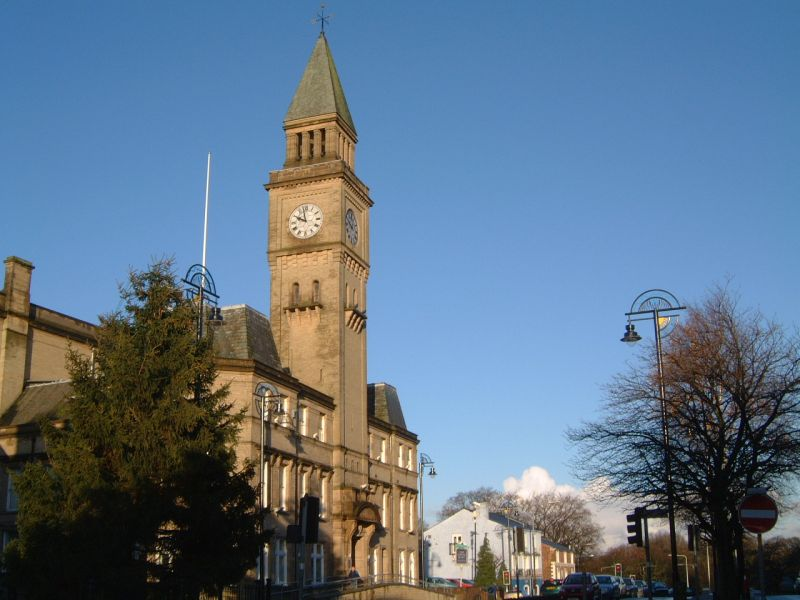
Chorley Town Hall 1875

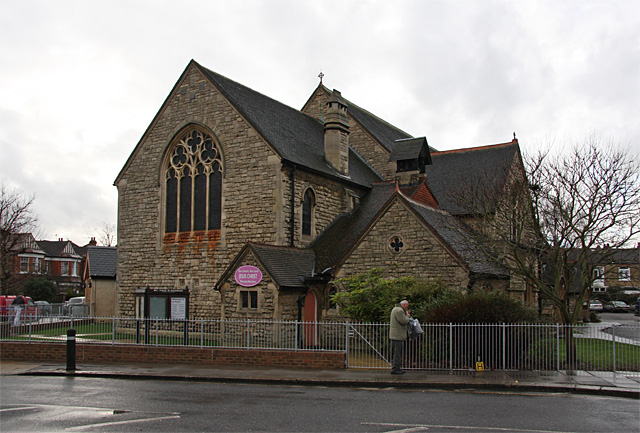
St Paul's Church, Long Lane, Finchley, London 1885-86

John Ladds, RIBA, (22 April 1835 – 15 October 1926) was an English architect known for his work on churches and schools, including several church-affiliated schools.

== Life ==
He was born on 22 April 1835 at Ellington, Cambridgeshire, the son of William Ladds (1798 - 1882) and Ann Inskip (1799 - 1875). He was the eighth child of 12.

He married Cecilia Townshend Kent (1832 - 1922) in St Clement Danes on 19 January 1867 and they had the following children:

- Sidney Inskip Ladds (1868 - 1950; who became an architect)
- Amy Cope Ladds (1868 - 1922)
- Harriet Cecilia Ladds (1871 - 1940)
- Mabel Mary Ladds (1872 - 1952)

Shortly after his marriage, he and his wife moved to 4 Chapel Street, Bedford Row, London. By 1881 he was living in the parish of St. George Martyr, Borough London. In the 1891 England and Wales Census his address was given as 7 Doughty Street, St. Pancras, London, where he remained until at least 1901. In 1911 his address was given as 93 Pemberton Road, Harringay, and it was in Harringay that he practised as an architect for the remainder of his career as an architect.

Ladds was also an amateur watercolour artist. His works included one looking towards his Harringay home from Finsbury Park.

He died on 15 October 1926 and left and estate valued at £3,560 10s 9d.

== Works ==
From around 1871, he worked in partnership with William Henry Powell (1847 - 1900) as Ladds and Powell, until Powell emigrated to South Africa around 1890.

His designs include:

- St John's Church, Lawley, Shropshire 1865 Grade II listed
- National School in Newport, Shropshire 1872
- The Corn Exchange, Bedford 1872-74
- Bowlee School, Rhodes near Manchester 1875
- Church School, Tonge, Alkrington, Lancashire 1875
- Chorley Town Hall, Lancashire 1875
- Christ Church, Marton Cum Grafton, North Yorkshire 1876 Grade II listed
- Kimbolton Grammar School, Cambridgeshire 1877
- St James' Church, Canterbury Street, Chorley, Lancashire 1878
- Chancel redecoration, Church of St John the Evangelist, Waterbeach, Cambridgeshire 1879-80
- Boxmoor Schools, Hemel Hempstead, Hertfordshire 1880
- Rivington and Blackrod High School, Rivington Lane, Rivington, Bolton 1881-82
- St Paul's Church, Finchley, London 1886
- Queen Elizabeth's School for Girls, Barnet Hill, High Barnet, London 1890 (extensions and rebuilding)
- New reredos, St Mary's Church, East Farleigh, Kent 1894
- Ophthalmic Hospital, Judd Street, London 1911-12

Some of Ladds' watercolours and drawings are held in the collection of The Norris Museum
