= Bedford Civic Theatre =

Civic Theatre
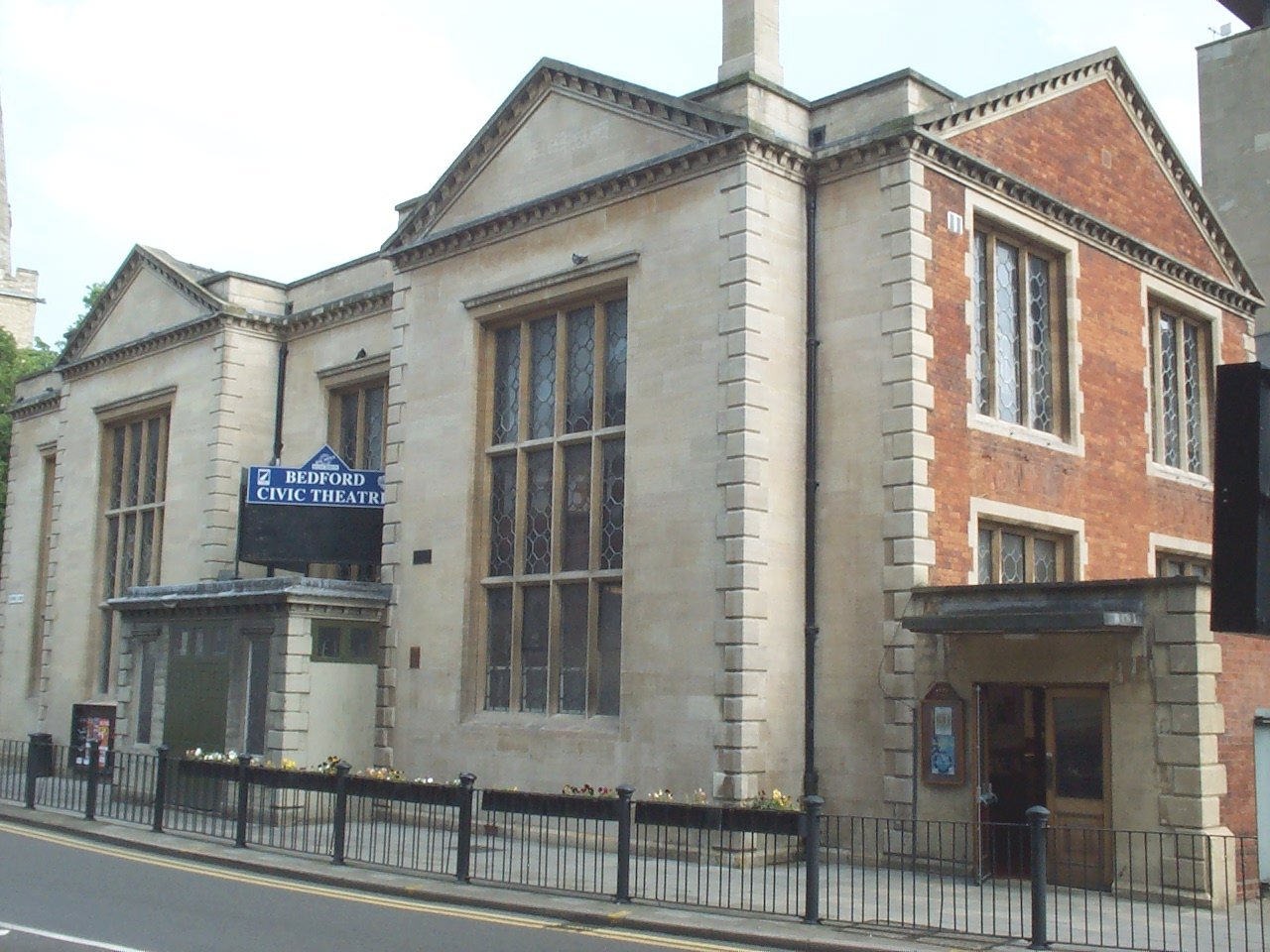

- Location within Bedfordshire
- Address: Horne Lane; Bedford, Bedfordshire; England
- Coordinates: 52.13466°N 0.46917°W
- Owner: Bedford Borough Council
- Operator: Corn Exchange, Bedford
- Capacity: 270
- Type: Local authority
- Designation: Listed Building Grade II
- Current use: Council Customer Service Centre

Construction
- Opened: 1952
- Closed: 2012
- Architect: James Horsford

The Bedford Civic Theatre was a theatre located on Horne Lane in the town centre of Bedford, Bedfordshire, England. The theatre operated from 1952 to its closure in 2012. The former theatre building is now used as a Council Customer Service Centre.

== History ==
First opened in 1952, the theatre was owned by Bedford Borough Council, and operated by the Corn Exchange, Bedford. It hosted a variety of events, exhibitions and performances, and groups such as the Bedford Dramatic Society, The Bradgate Players, Swan Theatre Company, Bedford Amateur Operatic Society and Bedford Marianettes regularly produced plays and musicals in the venue. The Bedford Pantomime Company started off producing a traditional pantomime at the theatre each Christmas before moving to the Corn Exchange. The Bedfringe festival, a pre-Edinburgh Fringe festival opened in 2007 and used the Civic Theatre as its main venue.

The building that housed the theatre is a Grade II Listed Building. It was built in 1859-1860 as the assembly hall of Bedford School. The architect was James Horsford, who also designed the former St Luke’s Church in St Peter’s Street. When the school relocated to its current site in 1891, the building was sold to the town council, and became part of the Town Hall, and was used as a council chamber and meeting room. The stage and proscenium arch were installed in about 1900. The name Civic Theatre was given to it by the late Weyman Mackay, a leading light in am-dram circles after Second World War, about the time that it was refurbished as a theatre around 1948-52. There used to be a plaque in the entrance foyer, but this was thrown away during the last redecoration in about 1995.

=== Closure ===
In April 2010, Bedford Borough Council announced its intention to close the Civic Theatre, converting the building into a 'one-stop-shop' for council services. The plans form part of a redevelopment of the surrounding area, which will include the demolition of Bedford Town Hall.

The Theatre was documented on The Theatres Trust website and was listed by the Trust in the 2010 Directory of Theatre Buildings At Risk.

A local campaign to Save Our Civic made up from members of the Amateur Dramatic Societies in Bedford and the surrounding area and other users of the Civic Theatre opposed the closure and conversion of the Theatre. They were supported by Patrick Hall, the town's former Member of Parliament, and Richard Fuller the current MP. However the Civic Theatre was closed in 2012, and the building now houses a Customer Service Centre for Bedford Borough Council.

== See also ==
- Bedford Corn Exchange
- University of Bedfordshire Theatre
