= Municipal Borough of Chorley =

Former local government area in the UK

Coordinates: 53.653°N 2.632°W

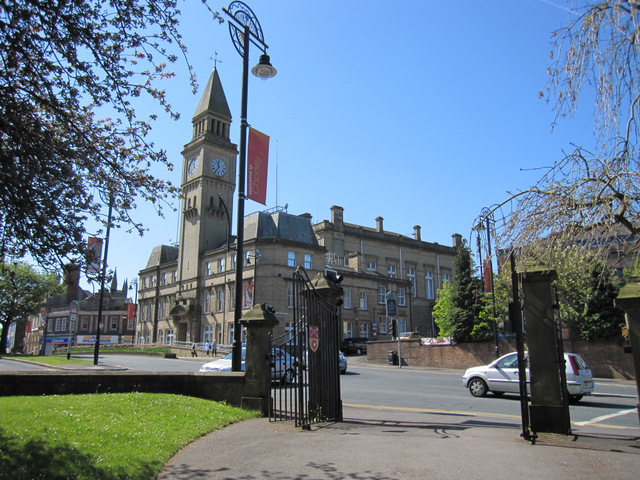
- Chorley Town Hall from St Laurence's Churchyard.
- Area
  - 1911: 3,614 acres (14.6 km^{2})
  - 1961: 4,283 acres (17.3 km^{2})
- Population
  - 1881: 19,478
  - 1961: 31,315
- History
  - Created: 1881
  - Abolished: 1974
  - Succeeded by: Borough of Chorley
- Status: Municipal borough (1881–1974)
  - HQ: Chorley Town Hall

The Municipal Borough of Chorley was a local government district in the administrative county of Lancashire, England, with municipal borough status and coterminate with the town of Chorley.

== History ==
Lying within the boundaries of the historic county of Lancashire since the early 12th century, Chorley was originally a township in the ancient parish of Croston until 1793 when it became a civil and ecclesiastical parish in its own right. Following the Poor Law Amendment Act 1834, Chorley joined with other townships (or civil parishes) in the area to become head of the Chorley Poor Law Union on 26 January 1837 which took responsibility for the administration and funding of the Poor Law within that Union area.

Although Chorley had been an independent civil parish since 1793, the old-fashioned government by a chief and deputy parish constables, with assistants, continued until 1853, when a Board of Improvement Commissioners was formed. Ten years later, the Commissioners held a meeting on 29 October 1863 and they duly adopted portions of the Public Health Act 1848 and the Local Government Act 1858.

In 1881, under the Municipal Corporations Act 1835, a charter of incorporation was obtained for the town. The Municipal Borough of Chorley was governed by a mayor and council of eight aldermen and twenty-four councillors, chosen equally from four wards — North, East, South and West. The borough's population remained roughly static in the 20th century, with the 1911 census showing 30,315 people and the 1961 census showing 31,315. It was enlarged by gaining 669 acres (2.7 km^{2}) from parts of the civil parishes of Duxbury, Euxton and Heath Charnock in 1934.

Under the Local Government Act 1972, the municipal borough was abolished on 1 April 1974 and its former area became the core of the larger non-metropolitan Borough of Chorley.

== Demography ==
Population changes of Chorley, 1881–1961

Year	Population	±%
1881	19,478	—
1891	23,087	+18.5%
1901	26,852	+16.3%

Year	Population	±%
1911	30,315	+12.9%
1921	30,581	+0.9%
1931	30,796	+0.7%

Year	Population	±%
1939	30,265	−1.7%
1951	32,640	+7.8%
1961	31,315	−4.1%

== List of mayors ==
The following is a list of mayors of the Municipal Borough of Chorley:

- 1881–1883: Augustus William Smethurst
- 1883–1884: Thomas Anderton
- 1884–1885: Thomas Whittle
- 1885–1886: John Heald
- 1886–1887: Thomas Forrester
- 1887–1889: Arthur George Leigh
- 1889–1891: Sir Henry Fleming Hibbert
- 1891–1893: John Whittle
- 1893–1894: James Lawrence
- 1894–1896: Thomas Howarth
- 1896–1897: Humphrey Norris Whittle
- 1897–1900: Bertram Jackson
- 1900–1902: George Thomas Brown (1st term)
- 1902–1904: Henry Bradley
- 1904–1905: George Thomas Brown (2nd term)
- 1905–1907: James Sharples
- 1907–1909: James Winder Stone
- 1909–1911: Henry William Hitchen
- 1911–1912: Alban Jolly
- 1912–1913: William Henry Killick
- 1913–1915: Ralph Hindle
- 1915–1917: James Turner
- 1917–1920: Lewis Wilson
- 1920–1922: John Fearnhead
- 1922–1924: John Sharples (1st term)
- 1924–1925: John Karfoot
- 1925–1925: John Sharples (2nd term)
- 1925–1927: Arnold Gillett (1st term)
- 1927–1930: Ernest Ashton
- 1930–1931: Arnold Gillett (2nd term)
- 1931–1933: Bertha Maud Gillett
- 1933–1935: Peter Henry Hodgkinson
- 1935–1936: William Wilcock (1st term)
- 1936–1939: Ralph Gent
- 1939–1942: Tom Hamer
- 1942–1944: Fredric Brindle
- 1944–1946: John Green
- 1946–1947: Richard Evans
- 1947–1949: Ernest Warburton
- 1949–1950: Samuel Cookson
- 1950–1951: George Brown Fletcher
- 1951–1952: Charles Williams
- 1952–1953: Thomas Heaton
- 1953–1954: Edith May Edwards
- 1954–1955: Bertram Harry Gaskell
- 1955–1956: William Wilcock (2nd term)
- 1956–1957: Willie Lowe
- 1957–1958: Thomas Grime
- 1958–1959: Edith Cunliffe
- 1959–1960: Constance Monks
- 1960–1961: Wilfred Rawcliffe MBE JP
- 1961–1962: George Reginald Rigby
- 1962–1963: Alic Robert Sheppard
- 1963–1964: David Dunn
- 1964–1965: Ian Sellars
- 1965–1966: Tom Clifton Shorrock
- 1966–1967: George Frederick Jones
- 1967–1968: Annie Forshaw
- 1968–1969: Walter Bleasdale
- 1969–1970: Adam Barnes
- 1970–1971: Thomas Rowlandson
- 1971–1972: Henry Vickers Davies
- 1972–1973: Dennis Edmund Seabrook
- 1973–1974: William Wilcock (3rd term)
