= Limbric =

Kind of cotton cloth

Limbric was a kind of cotton cloth with a fine warp and a soft, lustrous weft. Limbric has a peculiar construction with more pick density than the ends per inch. The fabric was used for dresses and casement curtains. Made in Limbrick, Lancashire, England originally. Standard dimensions of 72x100 were used, with a warp of 64s and a weft of 30s. The superior quality of cloth was produced by using combed yarns.

Moreen was another ribbed structure that was similar to Lambric.
