= Chorley (surname) =

Chorley is a surname. Notable people with the surname include:

- Ben Chorley (born 1982), English football player
- Charles Chorley (c. 1810 – 1874), English journalist and man of letters
- Henry Fothergill Chorley (1808–1872), English music critic
- John Rutter Chorley (1806–1867), English scholar of Spanish literature
- Matt Chorley (born 1982), British broadcaster
- Richard Chorley (1927–2002), English geographer
- Baron Chorley, peer of the United Kingdom
