= Heath Charnock =

Village in Lancashire, England

Coordinates: 53.625°N 2.613°W

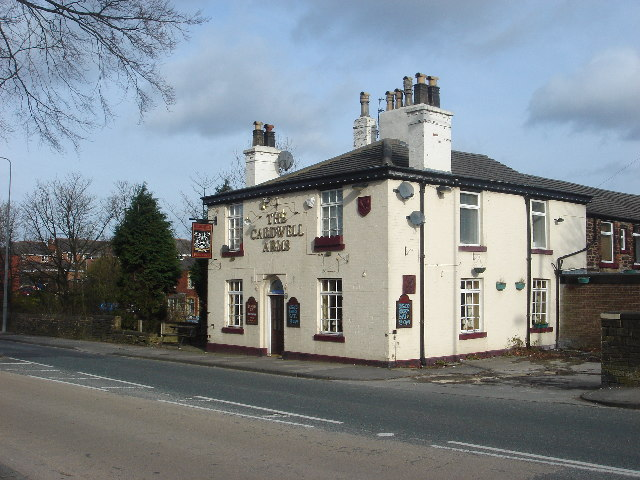
- The Cardwell Arms public house

- Shown within Chorley Borough Location within Lancashire
- Population: 2,026 (2011 Census)
- OS grid reference: SD595145
- Civil parish: Heath Charnock
- District: Chorley
- Shire county: Lancashire
- Region: North West
- Country: England
- Sovereign state: United Kingdom
- Post town: CHORLEY
- Postcode district: PR6, PR7
- Dialling code: 01257
- Police: Lancashire
- Fire: Lancashire
- Ambulance: North West
- UK Parliament: Chorley

Heath Charnock is a small village and civil parish of the Borough of Chorley in Lancashire, England. According to the United Kingdom Census 2001 it has a population of 2,065, reducing to 2,026 at the 2011 Census.

== Location ==
Heath Charnock is next to Adlington and Anderton. The civil parish includes the hamlet of Limbrick.

== History ==
Heath Charnock has been variously recorded as Charnock in 1271; Cernok, Heath Charnock, Hest Chernnoke, Est Chernoke in 1278, Chernocke Gogard in 1284, Hechernok, Heghchernok, Hethevchernoc, Hethchernok, Gogardeschernok and Hethchernock in 1292.

In the Middle Ages Heath Charnock was part of the Penwortham fee held by Randle de Marsey and then by the Ferrers. By 1288 there were two subordinate manors, one held by Thomas Banastre and one by William Gogard. The Banastre manor was acquired by John de Harrington and then the first Lord Mounteagle whose family held it until 1574 when it was sold to Thomas Walmsley and Robert Charnock. Walmsley sold his portion to Thomas Standish of Duxbury whose family eventually acquires the Charnock portion.

William Gogard was styled 'lord of Heath Charnock' and the township often called Charnock Gogard up to the 17th century. By sales and partitions this manor eventually disappeared except for a portion known as Hall o' th' Hill which was held by the Asshawe family by marriage but which was never a manor.

The hearth tax return for 1666 shows that there were 68 hearths in the township, 18 were accounted for in the houses of William Radley and Peter Shaw.

The Street was another ancient estate held by a family of the same name.

== Governance ==
Heath Charnock was a township in the Standish ecclesiastical parish in the Leyland hundred in Lancashire. It became part of the Chorley Rural Sanitary District from 1875 to 1894, and part of the Chorley Rural District from 1894 to 1974.

Since 1974, it has been a civil parish of the Borough of Chorley which is governed by 47 councillors, elected for four year terms to represent wards in the borough. In May 2010 the constitution of the Chorley council was Conservatives had 27 seats, Labour 15 seats, Liberal Democrats 3 seats and Independents 2 seats. Heath Charnock is part of the Chorley South East and Heath Charnock ward and has two Labour councillors, and one Reform Councillor. Chorley Council is part of the Lancashire County Council created in 1889 under the Local Government Act 1888 and reconstituted under the Local Government Act 1972. Heath Charnock is part of the Chorley Rural East ward and is represented by a Labour councillor

Heath Charnock is part of the Chorley parliamentary constituency which elected Lindsay Hoyle as Member of Parliament for the Labour party at the 2010 General Election, and in 2024 as The Speaker.

== Geography ==
The township is crossed by the River Yarrow and its eastern boundary is the Upper Rivington Reservoir. The land rises to the north east reaching a height of 650 feet (200 m). It covers an area of 1,599 acres (6.47 km^{2}) including 58 acres (230,000 m^{2}) of inland water, (the reservoir). The township was mostly agricultural, but there were brick works, stone quarries and a cotton mill operating in the early 20th century.

== Transport ==
The A6 road passes through Heath Charnock, connecting Chorley and Adlington, and the Bolton to Chorley road branches off to Horwich.There are roads to Wigan and Rivington. The M61 crosses the township north to south and is accessed at junction 6, Horwich, and junction 8, Chorley.

The Manchester, Bolton to Preston railway passes through Heath Charnock, with the nearest station is at Adlington.

The Leeds and Liverpool Canal passes through the township.

== See also ==
- Listed buildings in Heath Charnock
- Limbric
