= Borough of Chorley =

Coordinates: 53.653°N 2.632°W

- Borough and non-metropolitan district
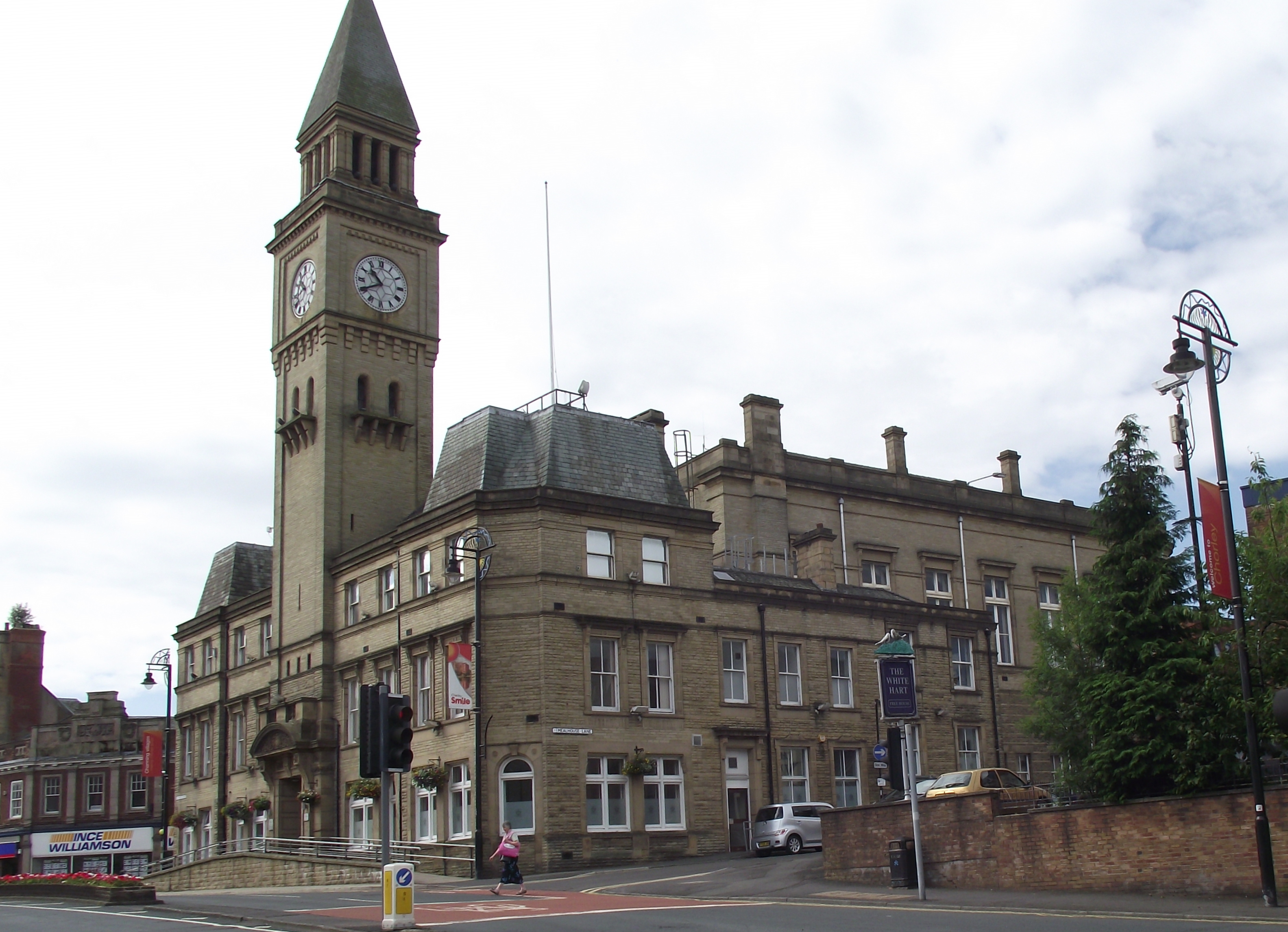
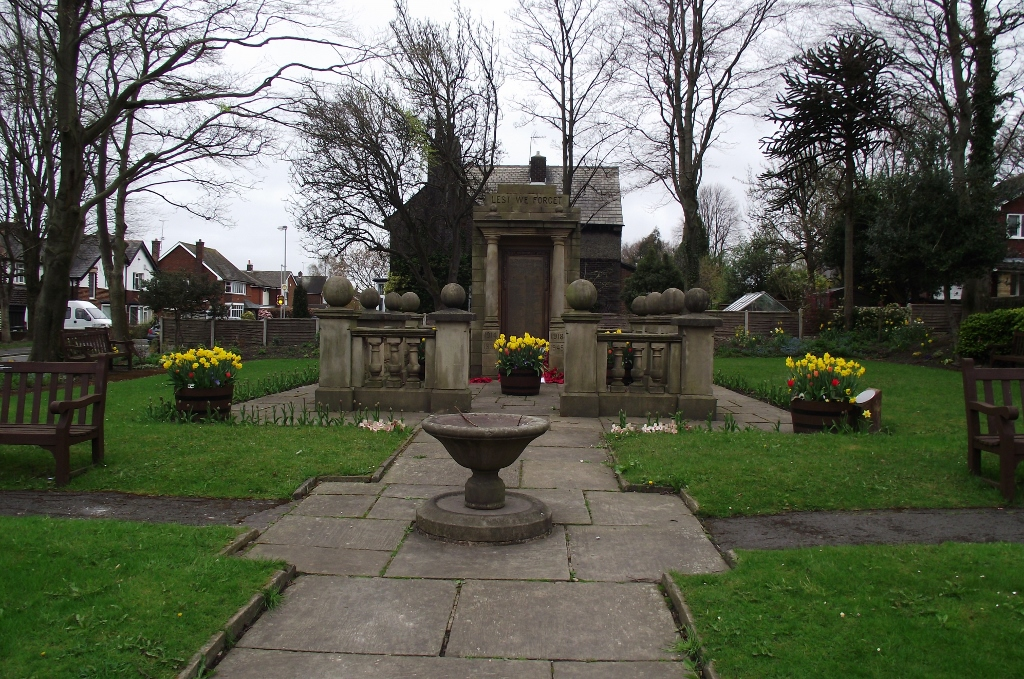
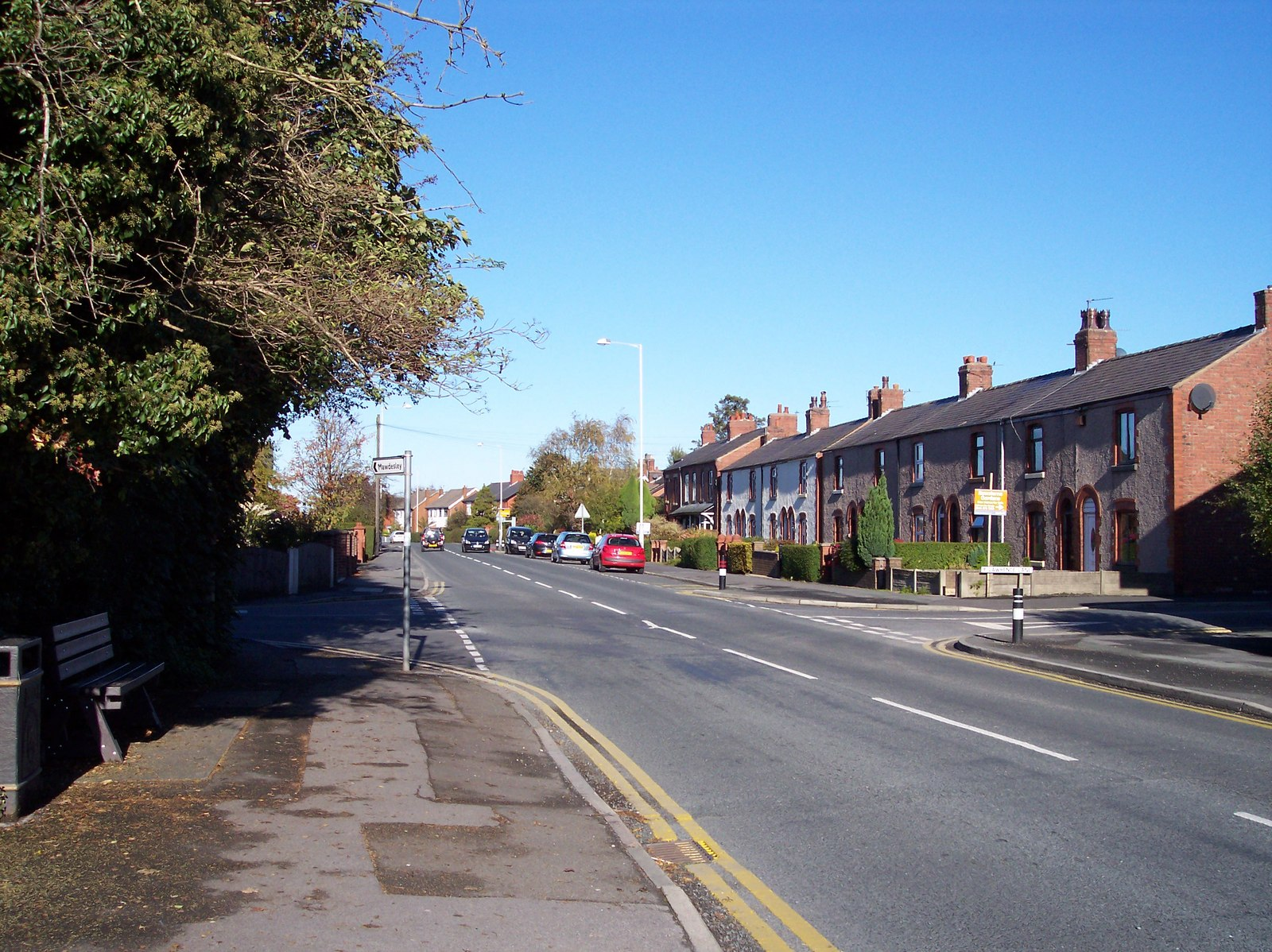
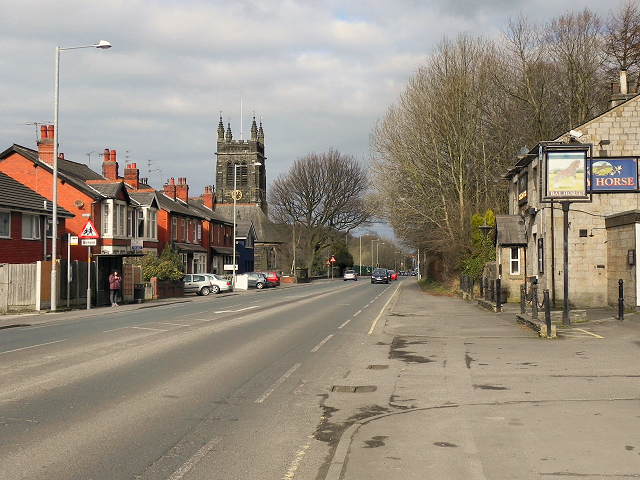
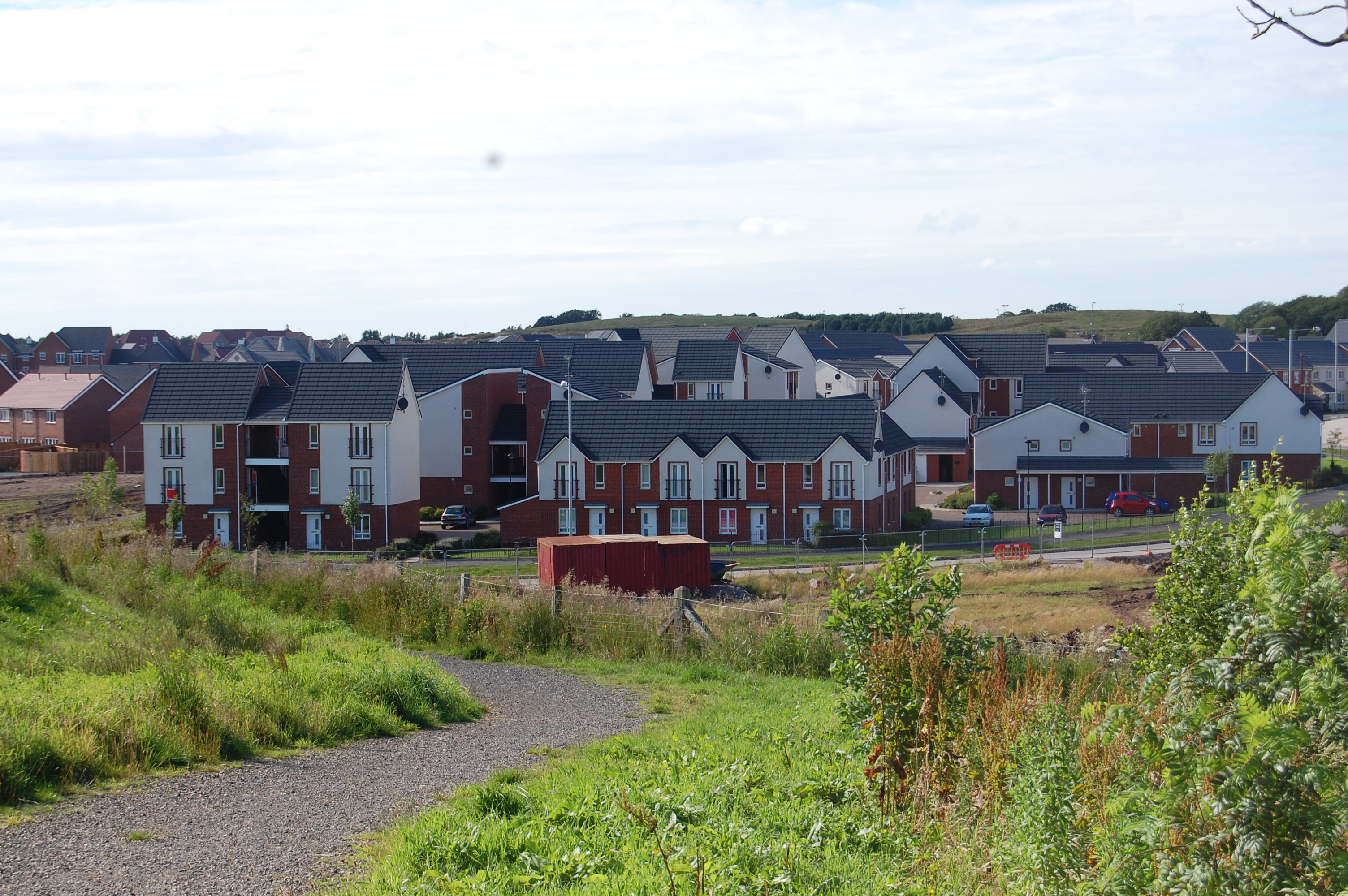
- From left to right; Top: Chorley town hall; Middle: Adlington war memorial and Eccleston village centre; Bottom: Whittle-le-Woods village centre and part of Buckshaw Village crossing the Chorley and South Ribble boundaries

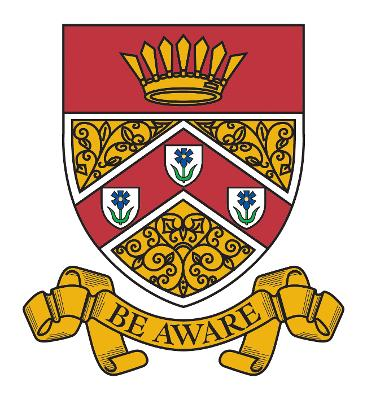
- Coat of arms

- Shown within Lancashire and England
- Sovereign state: United Kingdom
- Constituent country: England
- Region: North West England
- Ceremonial county: Lancashire
- Founded: 1 April 1974
- Admin. HQ: Chorley

Government
  - Type: Chorley Borough Council
  - MPs: Lindsay Hoyle (Speaker) Paul Foster (Labour)

Area
  - Total: 78 sq mi (203 km^{2})
  - Rank: 144th

Population (2024)
  - Total: 120,839
  - Rank: Ranked 206th
  - Density: 1,540/sq mi (595/km^{2})

Ethnicity (2021)
  - Ethnic groups: List: 95.6% White; 1.9% Asian; 1.5% Mixed; 0.6% Black; 0.4% other

Religion (2021)
  - Religion: List: 61.5% Christianity; 30.9% no religion; 5.1% not stated; 1.4% Islam; 0.5% other; 0.3% Hinduism; 0.2% Buddhism; 0.1% Sikhism; 0.1% Judaism
- Time zone: UTC+0 (Greenwich Mean Time)
  - Summer (DST): UTC+1 (British Summer Time)
- Postcode areas: PR6–PR7-PR25-PR26, BL6, L40
- Area codes: 01257, 01204, 01254, 01704, 01772
- ISO 3166-2: –
- ONS code: 30UE (ONS); E07000118 (GSS)
- OS grid reference: SD5817
- NUTS 3: –

The Borough of Chorley is a local government district with borough status in Lancashire, England. It is named after the town of Chorley, which is an unparished area. The borough extends to several villages and hamlets including Adlington, Buckshaw Village, Croston, Eccleston, Euxton and Whittle-le-Woods.

The neighbouring districts are West Lancashire, South Ribble, Blackburn with Darwen, Bolton and Wigan.

== History ==
The town of Chorley had been governed by improvement commissioners from 1853. The commissioners were reconstituted as a local board in 1863. The board was in turn replaced in 1881 when the town was made a municipal borough.

The modern district was created on 1 April 1974 under the Local Government Act 1972, covering the area of four former districts, which were all abolished at the same time:

- Adlington Urban District
- Chorley Municipal Borough
- Chorley Rural District
- Withnell Urban District

The new district was named Chorley, and the borough status previously held by the town was passed to the new district on the day that it came into being, allowing the chair of the council to take the title of mayor, continuing Chorley's series of mayors dating back to 1881.

Under current local government reorganisation plans, all district councils in Lancashire, as well as the county council, will be abolished in 2028, with the district becoming part of a new, controversially named South Lancashire unitary authority.

== Governance ==
Chorley Council

Type
- Type: Non-metropolitan district

History
- Founded: 1 April 1974

Leadership
- Mayor: Debra Platt, Conservative since 19 May 2026
- Leader: Alistair Bradley, Labour since 15 May 2012
- Chief Executive: Chris Sinnott since January 2023

Structure
- Seats: 42 councillors
- Graph of the party split among 42 seats.
- Political groups: Administration (29) Labour (29) Other parties (13) Reform (6) Conservative (4) Green (1) Independent (2)

Elections
- Voting system: First past the post
- Last election: 7 May 2026

Meeting place
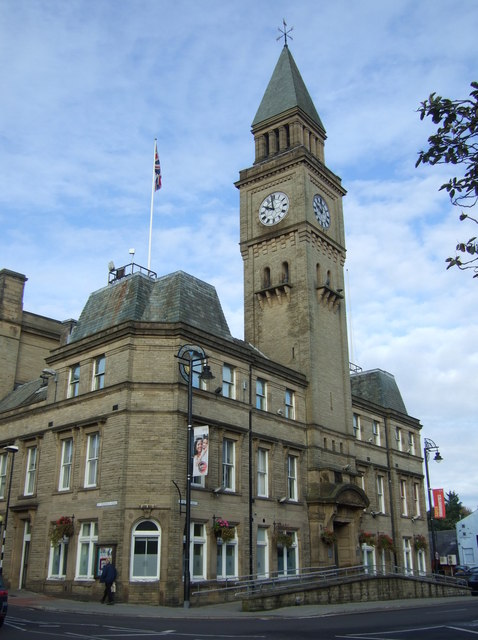
- Town Hall, Market Street, Chorley, PR7 1DP

Website
- www.chorley.gov.uk

Chorley Borough Council, which styles itself "Chorley Council", provides district-level services. County-level services are provided by Lancashire County Council. Much of the borough is also covered by civil parishes, which form a third tier of local government.

=== Political control ===
The council has been under Labour majority control since 2012.

The first election to the reformed borough council was held in 1973, initially operating as a shadow authority alongside the outgoing authorities before coming into its powers on 1 April 1974. Political control of the council since 1974 has been as follows:

Party in control	Years
No overall control	1974–1976
Conservative	1976–1983
No overall control	1983–1990
Labour	1990–1991
No overall control	1991–1995
Labour	1995–2000
No overall control	2000–2006
Conservative	2006–2011
No overall control	2011–2012
Labour	2012–present

=== Leadership ===
The role of mayor is largely ceremonial in Chorley. Political leadership is instead provided by the leader of the council. The leaders since 1985 have been:

Councillor	Party	From	To
Jim Moorcroft	Conservative		1985
John Holt	Conservative	1985	Mar 1986
Jim Moorcroft	Conservative	1986	May 1989
Jean Rigby	Conservative	May 1989	May 1990
John Wilson	Labour	May 1990	May 2006
Peter Goldsworthy	Conservative	16 May 2006	May 2012
Alistair Bradley	Labour	15 May 2012	

=== Composition ===
Following the 2026 election, and subsequent changes of allegiance up to September 2026, the composition of the council is as follows:

Party	Councillors
Labour	29
Reform	6
Conservative	4
Green	1
Independent	2
Total	42

The next election is due in 2027.

=== Elections ===
Since the last boundary changes in 2020 the council has comprised 42 councillors representing 14 wards, with each ward electing three councillors. Elections are held three years out of every four, with a third of the council (one councillor for each ward) elected each time for a four year term of office. Lancashire County Council elections are held in the fourth year of the cycle when there are no borough council elections.

The wards are:

1. Adlington & Anderton
2. Buckshaw & Whittle
3. Chorley East
4. Chorley North East
5. Chorley North West
6. Chorley North & Astley
7. Chorley South East & Heath Charnock
8. Chorley South West
9. Clayton East, Brindle & Hoghton
10. Clayton West & Cuerden
11. Coppull
12. Croston, Mawdesley & Euxton South
13. Eccleston, Heskin & Charnock Richard
14. Euxton

The Chorley constituency was coterminous with the borough from 1997 until 2010 when Croston, Eccleston, Bretherton and Mawdesley were transferred to the South Ribble constituency. The current Member of Parliament for Chorley is Lindsay Hoyle, who was first elected to the seat in 1997.

=== Premises ===
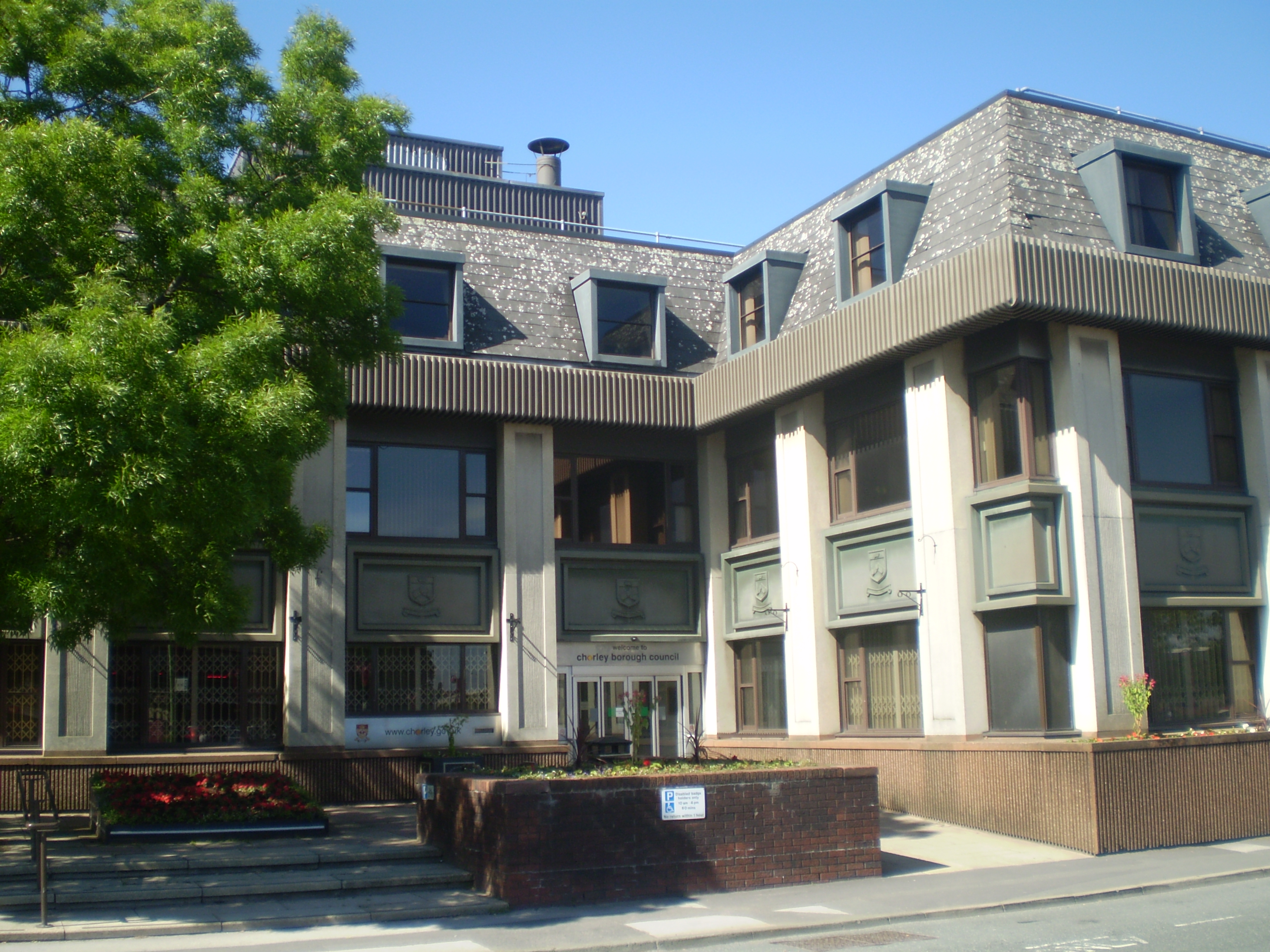
Civic Offices, Union Street

The council's main offices are at the Civic Offices on Union Street in Chorley. Council meetings are held at Chorley Town Hall on Market Street, which had been completed in 1879 for the old local board.

== Parishes ==
Parishes in Chorley Borough

The borough contains 23 civil parishes. The parish council for Adlington takes the style "town council". The central part of the borough, roughly corresponding to the pre-1974 borough of Chorley, is an unparished area.

1. Adlington
2. Anderton
3. Anglezarke
4. Astley Village
5. Bretherton
6. Brindle
7. Charnock Richard
8. Clayton-le-Woods
9. Coppull
10. Croston
11. Cuerden
12. Eccleston
13. Euxton
14. Heapey
15. Heath Charnock
16. Heskin
17. Hoghton
18. Mawdesley
19. Rivington
20. Ulnes Walton
21. Wheelton
22. Whittle-le-Woods
23. Withnell

== Settlements ==
Towns, villages and hills in the Borough of Chorley

== Freedom of the Borough ==
The following people and military units have received the Freedom of the Borough of Chorley.

=== Individuals ===
- Sir Henry Hibbert: 25 September 1922.
- James Winder Stone: 25 September 1922.
- Arnold Gillett: 17 June 1931.
- J. Fearnhead: 12 July 1944.
- Douglas Hacking, 1st Baron Hacking: 30 November 1946.
- Bertha Maude Gillett: 24 November 1960.

=== Military Units ===
- The Queen's Lancashire Regiment: 2005.
- 5 General Medical Support Regiment RAMC: 2007.
- The Duke of Lancaster's Regiment: 2007.
- 3 Medical Regiment: 6 June 2015.
- The Lancashire Constabulary.
