= 2016 Chorley Borough Council election =

2016 UK local government election

The 2016 Chorley Borough Council election took place on 5 May 2016 to elect members of Chorley Borough Council in England. This was on the same day as other local elections.

== Council make-up ==
After the election, the composition of the council was:

Party political make-up of Chorley Council
Party	Seats						Current Council (2016)
Party	2010	2011	2012	2014	2015	2016	Current Council (2016)
Labour	15	20	24	32	30	30	
Conservative	27	23	20	13	14	14	
Independent	2	2	2	2	3	3	
Lib Dems	3	2	1	0	0	0	

== Election result ==
Chorley local election result 2016
Party	Seats	Gains	Losses	Net gain/loss	Seats %	Votes %	Votes	+/−
Labour	10	0	0	Steady	68.8	52.9	13,780	−0.5
Conservative	4	0	0	Steady	25.0	28.6	7,444	−3.5
Independent	1	0	0	Steady	6.3	7.2	1,862	+0.0
UKIP	0	0	0	Steady	0.0	6.3	1,652	+2.2
Liberal Democrats	0	0	0	Steady	0.0	4.3	1,115	+2.2
Green	0	0	0	Steady	0.0	0.7	183	−0.4

== Results map ==
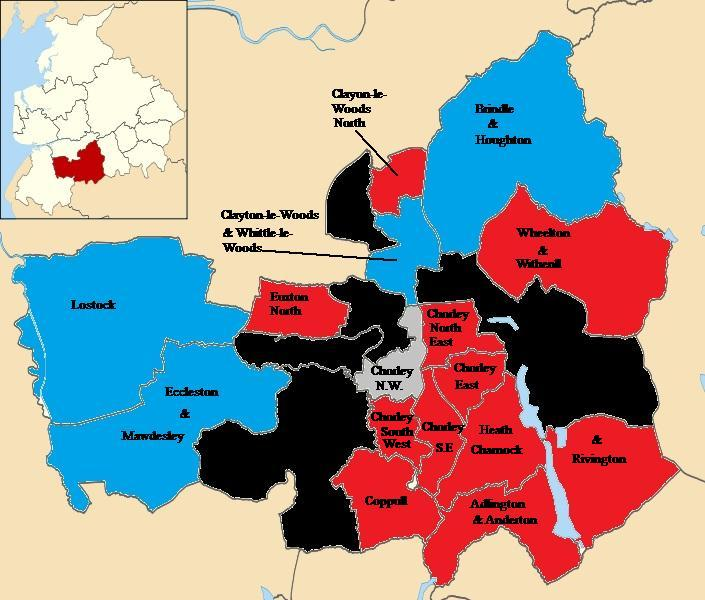
2016 results

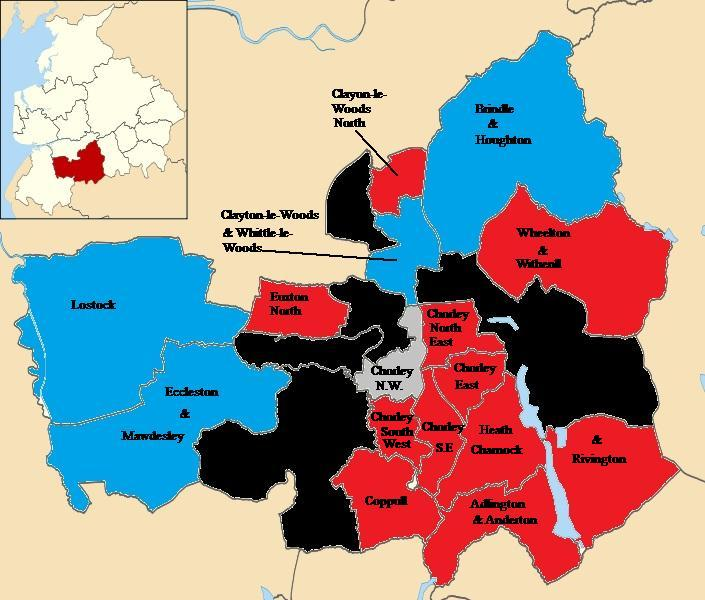
Previous 2012 results

== Ward results ==
=== Adlington and Anderton ===
Adlington and Anderton
Party	Candidate	Votes	%	±%
Labour	✓ Peter Francis Wilson	1,425	61.4	
Conservative	Dorothy Livesey	598	25.8	
Green	Andrew Whitson	183	7.9	
Liberal Democrats	Philip William Pilling	113	4.9	
Majority		827	35.7	
Turnout		2,319	40.4	
Labour hold		Swing		

=== Brindle and Hoghton ward ===
Brindle and Hoghton
Party	Candidate	Votes	%	±%
Conservative	✓ Sheila Mary Long	350	44.3	−19.4
Independent	Steve Williams	315	39.9	N/A
Labour	Yvonne Marie Hargreaves	125	15.8	−20.5
Majority		35	4.4	
Turnout		790	47.3	
Conservative hold		Swing	−29.7	

=== Chorley East ward ===
Chorley East
Party	Candidate	Votes	%	±%
Labour	✓ Zara Khan	1,176	67.4	−7.0
UKIP	Christopher Suart	348	19.9	N/A
Conservative	Aidy Riggott	222	12.7	−3.8
Majority		828	47.4	
Turnout		1,746	35.0	
Labour hold		Swing		

=== Chorley North East ward ===
Chorley North East
Party	Candidate	Votes	%	±%
Labour	✓ Adrian Lowe	1,049	63.7	−0.2
Conservative	Philip Adrian Ellis Loynes	331	20.1	+1.5
UKIP	Tommy Shorrock	268	16.3	+3.0
Majority		718	43.6	
Turnout		1,648	34.2	
Labour hold		Swing	−0.9	

=== Chorley North West ward ===
Chorley North West
Party	Candidate	Votes	%	±%
Independent	✓ Joyce Snape	1,547	64.3	−7.7
Labour	Anthony Stephen Holgate	547	22.7	+3.7
Conservative	Sandra Mercer	182	7.6	−1.4
UKIP	Julia Winifred Mary Smith	129	5.4	N/A
Majority		1,000	41.6	
Turnout		2,405	52.5	
Independent hold		Swing	-5.7	

=== Chorley South East ward ===
Chorley South East
Party	Candidate	Votes	%	±%
Labour Co-op	✓ Alistair Ward Bradley	1,261	62.8	+3.4
Conservative	Dominic Keiran Jewell	452	22.5	−5.3
UKIP	Shaun Jones	243	12.1	N/A
Liberal Democrats	David Porter	52	2.6	N/A
Majority		809	40.3	
Turnout		2,008	36.4	
Labour Co-op hold		Swing	+4.4	

=== Chorley South West ward ===
Chorley South West
Party	Candidate	Votes	%	±%
Labour	✓ Anthony Gee	1,351	73.7	+3.5
Conservative	Mrs. Sarah Louise Kiley	483	26.3	−3.5
Majority		868	47.3	
Turnout		1,834	31.1	
Labour hold		Swing	+3.5	

=== Clayton-le-Woods and Whittle-le-Woods ward ===
Clayton-le-Woods and Whittle-le-Woods
Party	Candidate	Votes	%	±%
Conservative	✓ John Philip Walker	1,126	46.1	−12.5
Labour	Mark Edward Clifford	962	39.4	−2.0
UKIP	Andrew Anthony Romanienko	203	8.3	N/A
Liberal Democrats	Glenda Charlesworth	151	6.2	N/A
Majority		164	6.7	
Turnout		2,442	38.0	
Conservative hold		Swing	−5.3	

=== Clayton-le-Woods North ward ===
Clayton-le-Woods North
Party	Candidate	Votes	%	±%
Labour	✓ Jean Elizabeth Cronshaw	1,027	61.8	+3.4
Conservative	Eileen Whiteford	636	38.2	−3.4
Majority		391	23.5	
Turnout		1,663	33.7	
Labour hold		Swing	+3.4	

=== Coppull ward ===
Coppull
Party	Candidate	Votes	%	±%
Labour	✓ Jane Louise Fitzsimons	832	48.6	−8.7
Liberal Democrats	Simon Thomson	610	35.6	+4.3
Conservative	Harold Heaton	271	15.8	+4.5
Majority		222	13.0	
Turnout		1,713	35.6	
Labour hold		Swing	−6.5	

=== Eccleston and Mawdesley ward ===
Eccleston and Mawdesley
Party	Candidate	Votes	%	±%
Conservative	✓ Henry William Caunce	953	46.1	−0.5
Labour	Stanley Joseph Ely	823	39.8	−2.4
UKIP	Mark Smith	292	14.1	+3.0
Majority		130	6.3	
Turnout		2,068	41.8	
Conservative hold		Swing	+1.0	

=== Euxton North ward ===
Euxton North
Party	Candidate	Votes	%	±%
Labour	✓ Danny Gee	1,108	72.4	+18.6
Conservative	Alan John Platt	254	16.6	−18.3
UKIP	Jeffrey Flinders Mallinson	169	11.0	−0.4
Majority		854	55.8	
Turnout		1,531	44.2	
Labour hold		Swing	+18.5	

=== Heath Charnock and Rivington ward ===
Heath Charnock and Rivington
Party	Candidate	Votes	%	±%
Labour Co-op	✓ Kim Snape	663	70.5	+15.1
Conservative	Peter Malpas	277	29.5	−2.9
Majority		386	41.1	
Turnout		940	54.4	
Labour Co-op hold		Swing	+9.0	

=== Lostock ward ===
Lostock
Party	Candidate	Votes	%	±%
Conservative	✓ John Derek Dalton	602	45.4	−10.6
Labour	Alan Whittaker	534	40.3	−3.7
Liberal Democrats	John Patrick Wright	189	14.3	N/A
Majority		68	5.1	
Turnout		1,325	39.2	
Conservative hold		Swing	−3.5	

=== Wheelton and Withnell ward ===
Wheelton and Withnell
Party	Candidate	Votes	%	±%
Labour	✓ Christopher France	897	55.9	−2.9
Conservative	Andrew James Snowden	707	44.1	+2.9
Majority		190	11.8	
Turnout		1,604	50.3	
Labour hold		Swing	−2.9	
