= 2015 Chorley Borough Council election =

2015 UK local government election

The 2015 Chorley Borough Council election took place on 7 May 2015 to elect members of Chorley Borough Council in England. This was on the same day as other local elections.

== Results Map ==
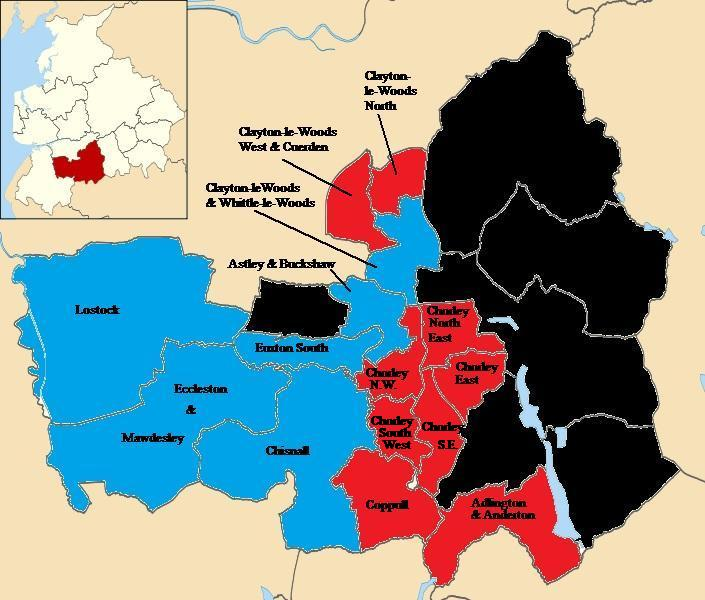
Previous 2011 results

== Council make-up ==
Party political make-up of Chorley Council
Party	Seats					Current Council (2015)
Party	2010	2011	2012	2014	2015	Current Council (2015)
Labour	15	20	24	32	30	
Conservative	27	23	20	13	14	
Independent	2	2	2	2	3	
Lib Dems	3	2	1	0	0	

== Election result ==
Chorley local election result 2015
Party	Seats	Gains	Losses	Net gain/loss	Seats %	Votes %	Votes	+/−
Labour	8	0	1	▼1	53.3	45.5	21,900	−3.5
Conservative	7	1	0	▲1	46.7	39.1	18,808	+0.8
UKIP	0	0	0	Steady	0	12.2	5,892	+8.1
Liberal Democrats	0	0	0	Steady	0	2.0	982	−4.2
Green	0	0	0	Steady	0	1.2	567	N/A

== Ward results ==
=== Adlington and Anderton ward ===
Adlington and Anderton
Party	Candidate	Votes	%	±%
Labour	June Molyneux	1,936	46.5	
Conservative	Charlotte Annaliese Woods	1,285	30.9	
UKIP	Stuart Rickaby	693	16.7	N/A
Liberal Democrats	Philip William Pilling	248	6.0	
Majority		651	15.6	
Turnout		4,162	70.7	
Labour hold		Swing		

=== Astley and Buckshaw ward ===
Astley and Buckshaw
Party	Candidate	Votes	%	±%
Conservative	Mark Perks	1,518	49.6	
Labour	Dan Croft	1,194	39.0	
UKIP	Jeffrey Flinders Mallinson	351	11.5	
Majority		324	10.6	
Turnout		3,063	70.7	
Conservative hold		Swing		

=== Chisnall ward ===
Chisnall
Party	Candidate	Votes	%	±%
Conservative	Paul Leadbetter	1,433	61.4	
Labour	Anthony Stephen Holgate	899	38.6	
Majority		534	22.9	
Turnout		2,332	71.9	
Conservative hold		Swing		

=== Chorley East ward ===
Chorley East
Party	Candidate	Votes	%	±%
Labour	Terry Brown	1,861	58.1	
Conservative	Mike Devaney	642	20.0	
UKIP	Christopher Suart	554	17.3	
Green	Robert Dale Daykin	148	4.6	
Majority		1,219	38.1	
Turnout		3,205	62.2	
Labour hold		Swing		

=== Chorley North East ward ===
Chorley North East
Party	Candidate	Votes	%	±%
Labour	Marion Lowe	1,651	53.2	
Conservative	Tom Norris	770	24.8	
UKIP	Thomas Anthony Shorrock	526	16.9	
Green	Claire Louise Ashworth	159	5.1	
Majority		881	28.4	
Turnout		3,106	62.3	
Labour hold		Swing		

=== Chorley North West ward ===
Chorley North West
Party	Candidate	Votes	%	±%
Labour	Aaron Beaver	1,636	47.6	
Conservative	Peter Malpas	1,321	38.4	
UKIP	Julia Winifred Mary Smith	479	13.9	
Majority		315	9.2	
Turnout		3,436	73.1	
Labour hold		Swing		

=== Chorley South East ward ===
Chorley South East
Party	Candidate	Votes	%	±%
Labour	Paul James Walmsley	1,812	49.6	
Conservative	Sarah Louise Kiley	1,130	30.9	
UKIP	Shaun Jones	578	15.8	
Liberal Democrats	David Porter	134	3.7	
Majority		682	18.7	
Turnout		3,654	66.4	
Labour hold		Swing		

=== Chorley South West ward ===
Chorley South West
Party	Candidate	Votes	%	±%
Labour	Margaret May Lees	1,855	51.7	
Conservative	Harold Heaton	1,087	30.3	
UKIP	Phillip Smith	646	18.0	
Majority		768	21.4	
Turnout		3,588	60.2	
Labour hold		Swing		

=== Clayton le Woods and Whittle-le-Woods ward ===
Clayton le Woods and Whittle-le-Woods
Party	Candidate	Votes	%	±%
Conservative	Ian Gregory Morgan	2,061	45.0	
Labour	Mark Edward Clifford	1,585	34.6	
UKIP	David George Humphries	594	13.0	
Liberal Democrats	Glenda Charlesworth	345	7.5	
Majority		476	10.4	
Turnout		4,585	70.2	
Conservative hold		Swing		

=== Clayton le Woods North ward ===
Clayton le Woods North
Party	Candidate	Votes	%	±%
Labour	Steve Murfitt	1,404	45.8	
Conservative	Magda Cullens	1,144	37.3	
Green	Gillian Sarah Hargreaves	260	8.5	
Liberal Democrats	Stephen John Fenn	255	8.3	
Majority		260	8.5	
Turnout		3,063	58.7	
Labour hold		Swing		

=== Clayton le Woods West and Cuerden ===
Clayton le Woods West and Cuerden
Party	Candidate	Votes	%	±%
Conservative	Alan Cullens	1,227	51.8	
Labour	Dave Rogerson	1,142	48.2	
Majority		85	3.6	
Turnout		2,369	70.0	
Conservative gain from Labour		Swing		

=== Coppull ward ===
Coppull
Party	Candidate	Votes	%	±%
Labour	Paul Clark	1,659	52.9	
Conservative	Joshua John Nelson	782	24.9	
UKIP	Mark Smith	695	22.2	N/A
Majority		877	28.0	
Turnout		3,136	64.6	
Labour hold		Swing		

=== Eccleston and Mawdesley ward ===
Eccleston and Mawdesley
Party	Candidate	Votes	%	±%
Conservative	Martin William Boardman	1,856	50.5	
Labour	Helen Margaret Bradley	1,377	37.5	
UKIP	Richard George Croll	442	12.0	N/A
Majority		479	13.0	
Turnout		3,675	74.0	
Conservative hold		Swing		

=== Euxton South ward ===
Euxton South
Party	Candidate	Votes	%	±%
Conservative	Debra Platt	1,017	43.9	
Labour	Stuart Anthony Clewlow	963	41.6	
UKIP	Philip Hayward	334	14.4	
Majority		54	2.3	
Turnout		2,314	72.2	
Conservative hold		Swing		

=== Lostock ward ===
Lostock
Party	Candidate	Votes	%	±%
Conservative	Doreen Dickinson	1,535	62.4	
Labour	Stanley Joseph Ely	926	37.6	
Majority		609	24.8	
Turnout		2,461	72.7	
Conservative hold		Swing		
