= 2008 Chorley Borough Council election =

2008 UK local government election

The 2008 Chorley Borough Council elections took place on 1 May 2008. One third of the council was up for election.

== Election result ==
Chorley local election result 2008
Party	Seats	Gains	Losses	Net gain/loss	Seats %	Votes %	Votes	+/−
Conservative	8	2	0	▲2	53.3	45.7	11,872	-0.9
Labour	5	0	1	▼1	33.3	35.1	9,128	-3.1
Independent	1	0	1	▼1	6.7	10.4	2,699	+4.4
Liberal Democrats	1	0	0	Steady	6.7	7.8	2,016	-0.5
New Party	0	0	0	Steady	0.0	1.1	276	+0.1

== Results map ==
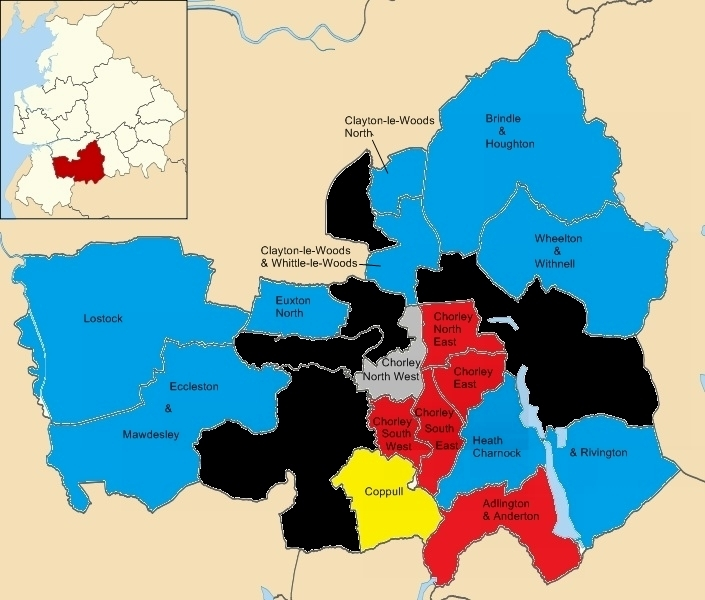
2008 results

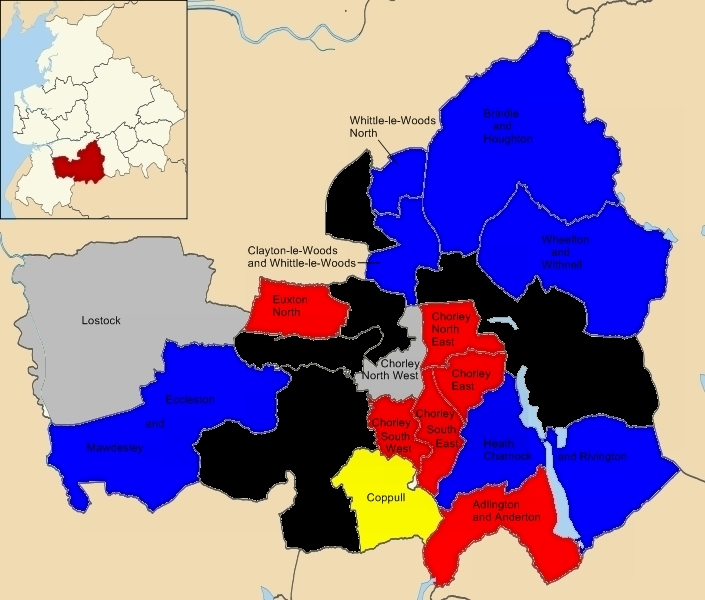
Previous 2004 results

== Ward results ==
=== Adlington and Anderton ===
Adlington and Anderton
Party	Candidate	Votes	%	±%
Labour Co-op	✓ Peter Wilson	1,103	44.5	−1.2
Conservative	Eric Catterall	1,079	43.6	+7.0
Liberal Democrats	Philip Ling	294	11.9	+1.1
Majority		24	1.0	−8.1
Turnout		2476	44.4	
Labour hold		Swing	−4.1	

=== Brindle and Hoghton ward ===
Brindle and Hoghton
Party	Candidate	Votes	%	±%
Conservative	✓ David Dickinson	648	81.6	+29.3
Labour	Neil Caton	146	18.4	+6.2
Majority		502	63.2	+30.3
Turnout		794	46.0	
Conservative hold		Swing	+11.6	

=== Chorley East ward ===
Chorley East
Party	Candidate	Votes	%	±%
Labour Co-op	✓ Julia Berry	974	62.4	+1.9
Conservative	Nicola Gregory	587	37.6	+13.3
Majority		387	24.8	−11.3
Turnout		1561	32.2	
Labour hold		Swing	-5.7	

=== Chorley North East ward ===
Chorley North East
Party	Candidate	Votes	%	±%
Labour Co-op	✓ Adrian Lowe	764	45.2	−5.1
Conservative	Simon Parkinson	650	38.5	+3.5
New Party	Colin Denby	276	16.3	+1.6
Majority		114	6.7	−8.6
Turnout		1,690	35.0	
Labour hold		Swing	−4.3	

=== Chorley North West ward ===
Chorley North West
Party	Candidate	Votes	%	±%
Independent	✓ Joyce Snape	2,055	76.3	−9.0
Labour	Jonathan Pryor	337	12.5	+5.0
Conservative	Barbara Higham	302	11.2	+3.9
Majority		1718	63.8	−14.0
Turnout		2,694	53.0	−1.5
Independent hold		Swing	−7.0	

N.B. Percentage change in Chorley North-West is taken from when a Snape last faced the electorate.

=== Chorley South East ward ===
Chorley South East
Party	Candidate	Votes	%	±%
Labour Co-op	✓ Alistair Ward Bradley	890	46.2	+2.7
Conservative	Eleanor Smith	834	43.3	−1.2
Liberal Democrats	David Porter	204	10.6	−1.4
Majority		56	2.9	+4.0
Turnout		1,928	40.0	
Labour hold		Swing	+2.0	

=== Chorley South West ward ===
Chorley South West
Party	Candidate	Votes	%	±%
Labour	✓ Anthony Gee	831	51.8	+9.7
Conservative	Dorothy Livesey	772	48.2	+16.1
Majority		59	3.7	−6.3
Turnout		1,603	28.5	
Labour hold		Swing	−3.2	

=== Clayton-le-Woods and Whittle-le-Woods ward ===
Clayton-le-Woods and Whittle-le-Woods
Party	Candidate	Votes	%	±%
Conservative	✓ John Walker	1,353	65.5	+8.4
Labour	Frances Maguire	387	18.7	−2.2
Liberal Democrats	Glenda Charlesworth	326	15.8	−6.2
Majority		966	46.8	+11.6
Turnout		2,066	37.0	
Conservative hold		Swing	+5.3	

=== Clayton-le-Woods North ward ===
Clayton-le-Woods North
Party	Candidate	Votes	%	±%
Conservative	✓ Alan Cullens	897	53.1	+11.7
Labour	Steve Murfitt	499	29.5	−6.6
Liberal Democrats	Stephen John Fenn	294	17.4	−5.1
Majority		398	23.6	+18.3
Turnout		1,690	34.9	
Conservative hold		Swing	+9.2	

=== Coppull ward ===
Coppull
Party	Candidate	Votes	%	±%
Liberal Democrats	✓ Stella Walsh	898	51.2	−0.1
Labour	Peter Gore	588	33.5	+0.9
Conservative	Stephen Royce	269	15.3	−0.8
Majority		310	17.7	−1.1
Turnout		1,755	36.6	
Liberal Democrats hold		Swing	−0.5	

=== Eccleston and Mawdesley ward ===
Eccleston and Mawdesley
Party	Candidate	Votes	%	±%
Conservative	✓ Henry Caunce	1,306	57.8	−2.4
Labour	Alan Whittaker	956	42.2	+2.4
Majority		350	15.5	−4.8
Turnout		2,262	48.2	
Conservative hold		Swing	−2.4	

=== Euxton North ward ===
Euxton North
Party	Candidate	Votes	%	±%
Conservative	✓ Debra Platt	908	54.9	+1.2
Labour	Danny Gee	745	45.1	−1.2
Majority		163	9.9	+2.5
Turnout		1,653	46.8	+3.3
Conservative gain from Labour		Swing	+1.2	

=== Heath Charnock and Rivington ward ===
Heath Charnock and Rivington
Party	Candidate	Votes	%	±%
Conservative	✓ Patricia Mary Case	573	72.3	+2.5
Labour	Paul James Walmsley	220	27.7	−2.5
Majority		353	44.5	+4.9
Turnout		793	46.0	
Conservative hold		Swing	+2.5	

Lostock
Party	Candidate	Votes	%	±%
Conservative	✓ Simon Moulton	846	56.8	+19.2
Independent	Margaret Iddon	644	43.2	−3.0
Majority		202	13.6	+22.2
Turnout		1,490	44.0	
Conservative gain from Independent		Swing	+11.1	

N.B. Percentage change in Lostock is taken from when Margaret Iddon last faced the electorate.

=== Wheelton and Withnell ward ===
Wheelton and Withnell
Party	Candidate	Votes	%	±%
Conservative	✓ Shaun Smith	848	55.1	+8.0
Labour	Chris France	690	44.9	+12.7
Majority		158	10.3	−4.6
Turnout		1,538	38.2	
Conservative hold		Swing	−2.4	
