= 2004 Chorley Borough Council election =

2004 UK local government election

Elections to Chorley Borough Council were held on 10 June 2004. One third of the council was up for election and the council stayed under no overall control.

After the election, the composition of the council was:

Party	Seats	±
Labour	21	▼1
Conservative	20	▲2
Liberal Democrat	3	▼1
Independent	3	Steady

Party political make-up of Chorley Council
Party	Seats				Current Council (2014)
Party	2010	2011	2012	2014	Current Council (2014)
Labour	15	20	24	32	
Conservative	27	23	20	13	
Independent	2	2	2	2	
Lib Dems	3	2	1	0	

== Election result ==
Chorley local election result 2004
Party	Seats	Gains	Losses	Net gain/loss	Seats %	Votes %	Votes	+/−
Conservative	6	2	0	▲2	40.0	36.0	11,169	−2.9
Labour	6	0	1	▼1	40.0	34.0	10,525	−9.1
Independent	2	0	0	Steady	13.3	11.9	3,692	+9.7
Liberal Democrats	1	0	1	▼2	6.7	18.1	5,602	+2.3

== Results Map ==
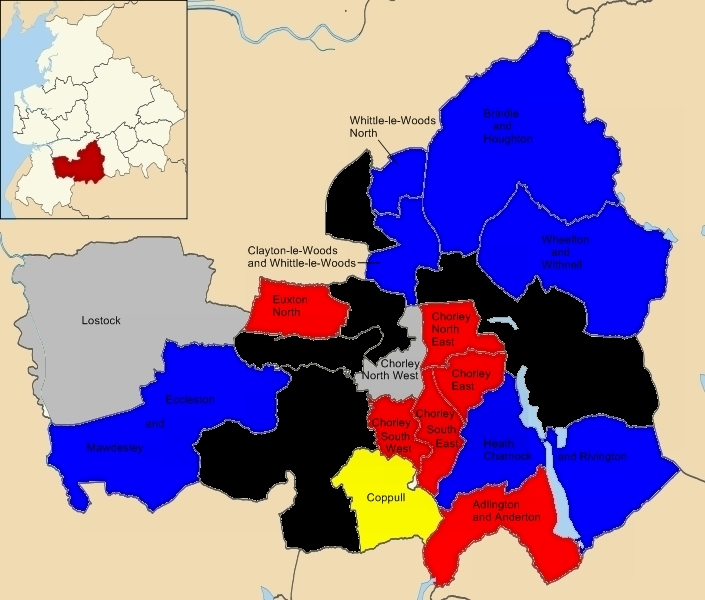
2004 results

== Ward results ==
=== Adlington and Anderton ===
Adlington and Anderton
Party	Candidate	Votes	%	±%
Labour	Michael Davies	1,226	43.8	−0.2
Conservative	Paul Barron	1,105	39.5	+1.6
Liberal Democrats	Philip William Pilling	469	16.8	−1.3
Majority		121	4.3	−1.8
Turnout		2,800	52.6	
Labour hold		Swing		

=== Brindle and Hoghton ward ===
Brindle and Hoghton
Party	Candidate	Votes	%	±%
Conservative	David Dickinson	521	52.3	−17.2
Independent	Stephen Williams	193	19.4	+19.4
Labour	Michael Graham	122	12.2	−2.9
Independent	Graham Dixon	91	9.1	+9.1
Liberal Democrats	William Mellor	69	6.9	−8.5
Majority		328	32.9	−21.2
Turnout		996	56.9	
Conservative hold		Swing		

=== Chorley East ward ===
Chorley East
Party	Candidate	Votes	%	±%
Labour	Mary Wilson	1,038	51.9	−7.9
Conservative	Elvi Livesey	443	22.2	+1.7
Liberal Democrats	Jean Mellor	309	15.5	+15.5
Independent	Thomas Fawcett	209	10.5	−9.2
Majority		595	29.7	−9.6
Turnout		1,999	40.6	
Labour hold		Swing		

=== Chorley North East ward ===
Chorley North East
Party	Candidate	Votes	%	±%
Labour	Adrian Lowe	913	41.3	−11.9
Liberal Democrats	Christopher Blackburn	679	30.7	+16.9
Conservative	Simon Parkinson	618	28.0	−5.0
Majority		234	10.6	−9.6
Turnout		2,210	45.0	
Labour hold		Swing		

=== Chorley North West ward ===
Chorley North West
Party	Candidate	Votes	%	±%
Independent	Joyce Snape	2,290	77.0	+77.0
Conservative	Magdalene Cullens	375	12.6	−29.4
Liberal Democrats	Linda Norman	220	7.4	−12.9
Independent	Philip Baker	88	3.0	+3.0
Majority		1,915	64.4	
Turnout		2,973	60.1	
Independent hold		Swing		

=== Chorley South East ward ===
Chorley South East
Party	Candidate	Votes	%	±%
Labour	Ms. Margaret Lees	999	45.1	−6.2
Conservative	Dorothy Livesey	768	34.7	+0.1
Liberal Democrats	David Porter	446	20.2	+6.1
Majority		231	10.4	−6.3
Turnout		2,213	46.9	
Labour hold		Swing		

=== Chorley South West ward ===
Chorley South West
Party	Candidate	Votes	%	±%
Labour	Anthony Gee	841	47.4	−10.8
Conservative	Elsie Perks	482	27.1	+2.5
Liberal Democrats	Ms. Linda Eubank	453	25.5	+8.3
Majority		359	20.3	−13.3
Turnout		1,776	38.4	
Labour hold		Swing		

=== Clayton-le-Woods and Whittle-le-Woods ward ===
Clayton le Woods and Whittle-le-Woods
Party	Candidate	Votes	%	±%
Conservative	John Walker	1,361	51.4	+3.5
Liberal Democrats	Glenda Charlesworth	679	25.6	−0.3
Labour	Sharon Gray	608	23.0	−3.2
Majority		682	25.8	+4.1
Turnout		2,648	50.5	
Conservative hold		Swing		

=== Clayton-le-Woods North ward ===
Clayton le Woods North
Party	Candidate	Votes	%	±%
Conservative	Alan Cullens	813	39.6	+2.8
Liberal Democrats	Stephen John Fenn	736	35.9	−0.1
Labour	David Unsworth	502	24.5	−2.7
Majority		77	3.7	+2.9
Turnout		2,051	41.4	
Conservative gain from Liberal Democrats		Swing		

=== Coppull ward ===
Coppull
Party	Candidate	Votes	%	±%
Liberal Democrats	Stella Walsh	1,187	48.4	+6.0
Labour	Beverley Gore	966	39.4	−6.2
Conservative	Stephen Royce	299	12.2	+0.2
Majority		221	9.0	
Turnout		2,452	50.4	
Liberal Democrats hold		Swing		

=== Eccleston and Mawdesley ward ===
Eccleston and Mawdesley
Party	Candidate	Votes	%	±%
Conservative	Henry Caunce	1,358	53.8	+2.4
Labour	Helen Margaret Bradley	1,168	46.2	−2.3
Majority		190	7.6	+4.7
Turnout		2,526	54.8	
Conservative hold		Swing		

=== Euxton North ward ===
Euxton North
Party	Candidate	Votes	%	±%
Labour	Daniel Gee	1,016	53.3	
Conservative	Rosemary Russell	890	46.7	
Majority		126	6.6	
Turnout		1,906	55.1	
Labour hold		Swing		

=== Heath Charnock and Rivington ward ===
Heath Charnock and Rivington
Party	Candidate	Votes	%	±%
Conservative	Mary Case	661	69.8	+5.5
Labour	Florence Molyneaux	286	30.2	−5.5
Majority		375	39.6	+11.0
Turnout		947	54.8	
Conservative hold		Swing		

=== Lostock ward ===
Lostock
Party	Candidate	Votes	%	±%
Independent	Margaret Iddon	821	46.2	N/A
Conservative	Simon Moulton	667	37.6	−17.5
Labour	Patricia Tack	288	16.2	−28.7
Majority		154	8.6	
Turnout		1,776	54.2	
Independent hold		Swing		

=== Wheelton and Withnell ward ===
Wheelton and Withnell
Party	Candidate	Votes	%	±%
Conservative	Shaun Smith	808	47.1	
Labour	Christopher Howard	552	32.2	
Liberal Democrats	Shelagh Graham	355	20.7	
Majority		256	14.9	
Turnout		1,715	53.4	
Conservative gain from Labour		Swing		
