= 2012 Chorley Borough Council election =

2012 UK local government election

Elections to Chorley Borough Council were held on 3 May 2012. One third of the council was up for election and the Labour Party won majority control from the Conservative-Liberal Democrat Coalition. Labour gaining control of this council was notable as David Cameron visited the town in 2006 when the Conservative Party gained control saying "this is the beginning." Nick Robinson of the BBC asked on the election coverage, "then what is it now?"

== Council make-up ==
After the election, the composition of the council was:

Party political make-up of Chorley Council
Party	Seats			Current Council (2012)
Party	2010	2011	2012	Current Council (2012)
Labour	15	20	24	
Conservative	27	23	20	
Independent	2	2	2	
Lib Dems	3	2	1	

== Election result ==
Chorley local election result 2012
Party	Seats	Gains	Losses	Net gain/loss	Seats %	Votes %	Votes	+/−
Labour	11	4	0	▲4	68.8	53.4	14,194	+3.4
Conservative	4	0	3	▼3	25.0	32.1	8,531	−5.9
Independent	1	0	0	Steady	6.3	7.2	1,906	+5.2
UKIP	0	0	0	Steady	0	4.1	1,088	+0.1
Liberal Democrats	0	0	1	▼1	0	2.1	555	−3.9
Green	0	0	0	Steady	0	1.1	293	+1.1

== Results map ==
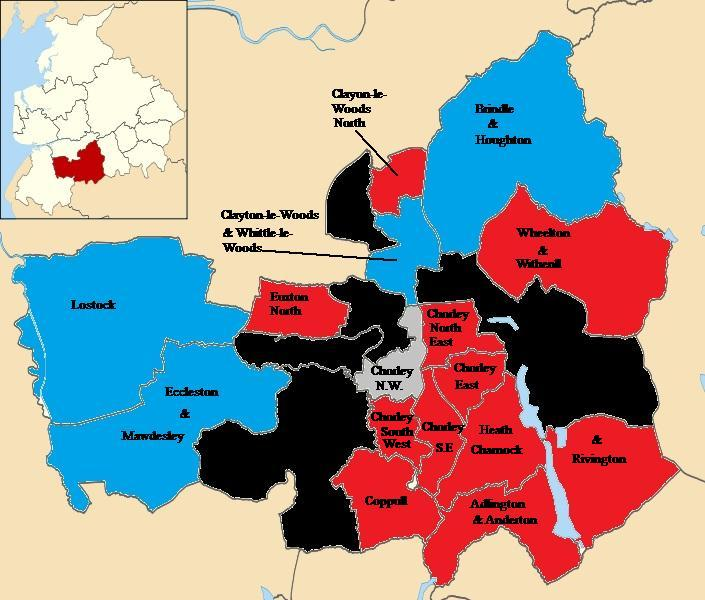
2012 results

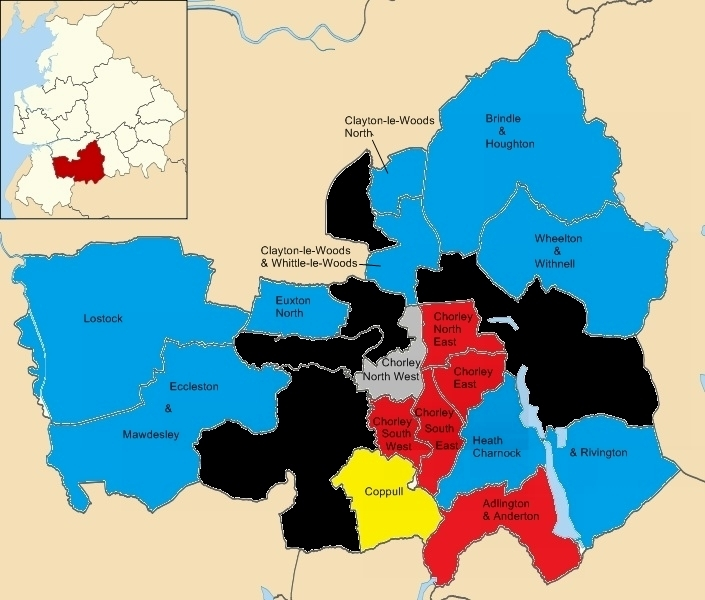
Previous 2008 results

== Ward results ==
=== Adlington and Anderton ===
Adlington and Anderton (2)
Party	Candidate	Votes	%	±%
Labour	✓ Peter Wilson	1,290		
Labour	✓ Graham Dunn	1,241		
Conservative	Mike Devaney	580		
Conservative	Elliot Matthews	473		
UKIP	Hayden Clewlow	340		
Turnout		3,924		
Labour hold		Swing		
Labour hold		Swing		

=== Brindle and Hoghton ward ===
Brindle and Hoghton
Party	Candidate	Votes	%	±%
Conservative	✓ David Dickinson	430	63.7	−17.9
Labour	Chris Caton	244	36.3	+17.9
Majority		186	27.6	
Turnout		674	39.2	
Conservative hold		Swing	−17.9	

=== Chorley East ward ===
Chorley East
Party	Candidate	Votes	%	±%
Labour Co-op	✓ Julia Berry	1,151	74.4	−2.0
Conservative	Simon Parkinson	253	16.5	+1
Green	Alan Leach	144	9.3	N/A
Majority		898	58.0	−2.0
Turnout		1,548	31.9	
Labour hold		Swing	−1.0	

=== Chorley North East ward ===
Chorley North East
Party	Candidate	Votes	%	±%
Labour	✓ Adrian Lowe	1,068	63.9	−2.0
Conservative	Sandra Mercer	311	18.6	−15.0
UKIP	Tommy Shorrock	223	13.3	N/A
Green	Stephen Cross	69	4.1	N/A
Majority		757	45.3	+13
Turnout		1,671	33.4	
Labour hold		Swing	+7	

=== Chorley North West ward ===
Chorley North West
Party	Candidate	Votes	%	±%
Independent	✓ Joyce Snape	1,755	72	−11.0
Labour	Geoffrey O'Donoghue	476	19	+19
Conservative	David Metcalfe	218	9	−3.0
Majority		1279	52	
Turnout		2,449	51.9	
Independent hold		Swing	−15.0	

N.B. Percentage change is taken from when a Snape last faced the electorate.

=== Chorley South East ward ===
Chorley South East
Party	Candidate	Votes	%	±%
Labour Co-op	✓ Alistair Ward Bradley	1,079	59.4	+8
Conservative	Samuel Andrew Chapman	505	27.8	−6
Independent	Glynn Hughes	151	8.3	N/A
Green	Alistair James Straw	80	4.4	N/A
Majority		574	31.6	+14
Turnout		1,815	36.2	
Labour hold		Swing	+7	

=== Chorley South West ward ===
Chorley South West
Party	Candidate	Votes	%	±%
Labour	✓ Anthony Gee	1,087	70.2	+13
Conservative	Terry Cook	462	29.8	+5
Majority		625	40.3	+8
Turnout		1,549	26.7	
Labour hold		Swing	+4	

=== Clayton-le-Woods and Whittle-le-Woods ward ===
Clayton le Woods and Whittle-le-Woods
Party	Candidate	Votes	%	±%
Conservative	✓ John Walker	1,220	58.6	+10
Labour	Frances Maguire	861	41.4	+8
Majority		359	17.3	
Turnout		2,081	34.5	
Conservative hold		Swing	+1	

=== Clayton-le-Woods North ward ===
Clayton le Woods North
Party	Candidate	Votes	%	±%
Labour	✓ Jean Cronshaw	1,000	58.4	+13
Conservative	Alan Cullens	711	41.6	+6
Majority		289	17	+8
Turnout		1,711	33.2	
Labour gain from Conservative		Swing	+4	

=== Coppull ward ===
Coppull
Party	Candidate	Votes	%	±%
Labour	✓ Robert Finnamore	1,017	57.3	+2
Liberal Democrats	Stella Walsh	555	31.3	−2.0
Conservative	Peter Malpas	201	11.3	−1
Majority		462	26.1	+4
Turnout		1,773	36.9	
Labour gain from Liberal Democrats		Swing	+2	

=== Eccleston and Mawdesley ward ===
Eccleston and Mawdesley
Party	Candidate	Votes	%	±%
Conservative	✓ Henry Caunce	1,009	46.6	−10.1
Labour	Stanley Joseph Ely	914	42.2	−0.1
UKIP	Robert Keane	241	11.1	N/A
Majority		95	4.4	−10.0
Turnout		2,164	45.0	
Conservative hold		Swing	−5	

=== Euxton North ward ===
Euxton North
Party	Candidate	Votes	%	±%
Labour	✓ Daniel Gee	847	53.8	+7
Conservative	Debra Platt	549	34.9	−12
UKIP	Jeffrey Flinders Mallinson	179	11.4	N/A
Majority		298	18.9	+26
Turnout		1,575	45.1	
Labour gain from Conservative		Swing	+10	

=== Heath Charnock and Rivington ward ===
Heath Charnock and Rivington
Party	Candidate	Votes	%	±%
Labour	✓ Kim Snape	475	55.4	+27
Conservative	Barbara Catterall	278	32.4	−40.0
UKIP	Nigel Cecil	105	12.2	N/A
Majority		197	23.0	+68
Turnout		858	48.8	
Labour gain from Conservative		Swing	+34	

=== Lostock ward ===
Lostock
Party	Candidate	Votes	%	±%
Conservative	✓ John Dalton	708	56.0	+13
Labour	Alan Whittaker	556	44.0	+24
Majority		152	12.0	+6
Turnout		1,264	37.4	
Conservative hold		Swing	−6.0	

=== Wheelton and Withnell ward ===
Wheelton and Withnell
Party	Candidate	Votes	%	±%
Labour	✓ Christopher France	888	58.8	+12.0
Conservative	David Morgan	623	41.2	−12.0
Majority		265	17.5	+24
Turnout		1,511	47.2	
Labour hold		Swing	+12.0	
