= 2011 Chorley Borough Council election =

2011 UK local government election

Elections to Chorley Borough Council were held on 5 May 2011. One third of the council was up for election and the Conservative party lost overall control to NOC.

== Council Make-up ==
After the election, the composition of the council was:

Party political make-up of Chorley Council
Party	Seats			Council (2011–2012)
Party	2008	2010	2011	Council (2011–2012)
Conservative	27	27	23	
Labour	15	15	20	
Lib Dems	3	3	2	
Independent	2	2	2	

== Election result ==
Chorley local election result 2011
Party	Seats	Gains	Losses	Net gain/loss	Seats %	Votes %	Votes	+/−
Labour	9	5	0	▲5	60	49.0	14,467	+10
Conservative	6	0	4	▼4	40	38.3	11,308	−1
Liberal Democrats	0	0	1	▼1	0	6.2	1,818	−6
UKIP	0	0	0	Steady	0	4.1	1,220	+3
Independent	0	0	0	Steady	0	2.4	707	−6

== Results Map ==
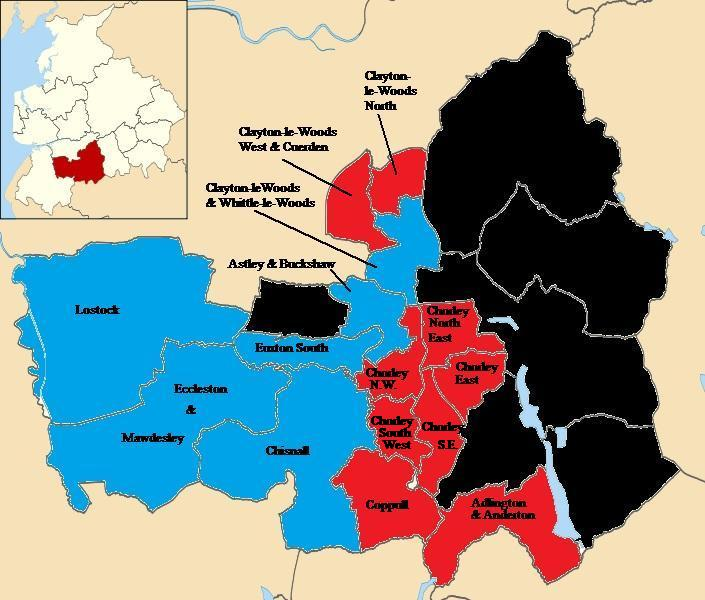
2011 results

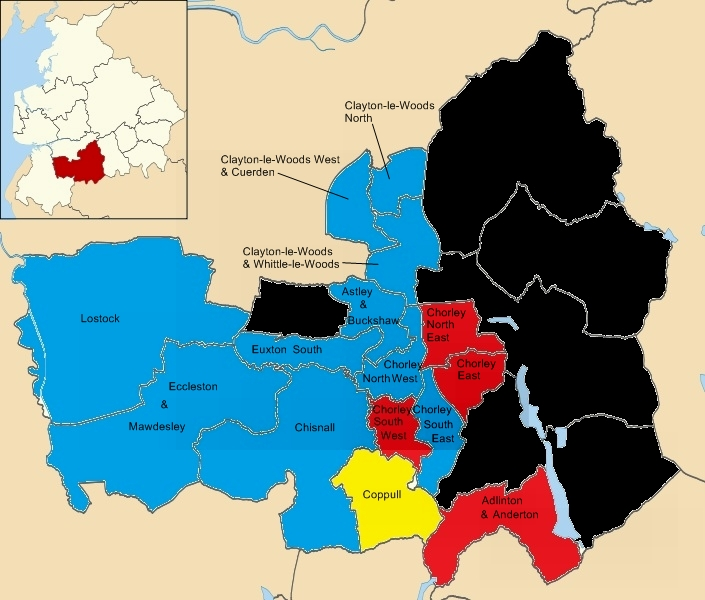
Previous 2007 results

== Ward results ==
=== Adlington and Anderton ===
Adlington and Anderton
Party	Candidate	Votes	%	±%
Labour	✓ June Molyneux	1,418	55.0	−2
Conservative	Lawrence Catterall	898	34.8	+5
Liberal Democrats	Glyn Hughes	264	10.2	−3
Majority		520	20.2	−7
Turnout		2,580	46.9	−26
Labour hold		Swing	−3.5	

=== Astley and Buckshaw ward ===
Astley and Buckshaw
Party	Candidate	Votes	%	±%
Conservative	✓ Mark Perks	872	54.3	+0
Labour	Ian Handley	599	37.3	−9
UKIP	Jeffrey Flinders Mallinson	134	8.3	N/A
Majority		273	17.0	+14
Turnout		1,605	49.0	−23
Conservative hold		Swing	+4.5	

=== Chisnall ward ===
Chisnall
Party	Candidate	Votes	%	±%
Conservative	✓ Paul Leadbetter	739	49.5	−2
Labour	Danny Gee	607	40.7	+14
Liberal Democrats	Patricia Cuerden	146	9.8	−5
Majority		132	8.8	−15
Turnout		1,492	46	−26
Conservative hold		Swing	−8	

=== Chorley East ward ===
Chorley East
Party	Candidate	Votes	%	±%
Labour	✓ Terry Brown	1,381	75.8	+18
Conservative	Simon Parkinson	276	15.2	−7
UKIP	Tommy Shorrock	164	9.0	N/A
Majority		1,105	60.7	+24
Turnout		1,821	38	−25
Labour hold		Swing	+12.5	

=== Chorley North East ward ===
Chorley North East
Party	Candidate	Votes	%	±%
Labour	✓ Marion Lowe	1,280	66.2	+18
Conservative	Elliot Matthews	653	33.8	+6
Majority		627	32.4	+12
Turnout		1,933	40	−27
Labour hold		Swing	+6	

=== Chorley North West ward ===
Chorley North West
Party	Candidate	Votes	%	±%
Labour	✓ Pauline Phipps	1,538	56.0	+12
Conservative	Peter Malpas	1,207	44.0	−12
Majority		331	12.1	+24
Turnout		2,745	58	−13
Labour gain from Conservative		Swing	+12	

N.B. Percentage change in vote is from 2007

=== Chorley South East ward ===
Chorley South East
Party	Candidate	Votes	%	±%
Labour	✓ Paul James Walmsley	1,056	50.7	+6
Conservative	Samuel Andrew Chapman	701	33.7	−1.0
UKIP	Nigel Cecil	137	6.6	N/A
Independent	Chris P. Curtis	103	4.9	N/A
Liberal Democrats	David Porter	86	4.1	−12.0
Majority		355	17.0	+6
Turnout		2,083	43.1	−23.0
Labour gain from Conservative		Swing	+3.5	

=== Chorley South West ward ===
Chorley South West
Party	Candidate	Votes	%	±%
Labour	✓ Anthony Stephen Holgate	1,115	57.1	+10
Conservative	Dr. Bulvinder Michael	487	24.9	−8
Liberal Democrats	Colin Grunstein	193	9.9	−10
UKIP	Alan Wallbank	157	8.0	N/A
Majority		628	32.2	+18
Turnout		1,952	34	−26
Labour hold		Swing	+9	

=== Clayton le Woods and Whittle-le-Woods ward ===
Clayton le Woods and Whittle-le-Woods
Party	Candidate	Votes	%	±%
Conservative	✓ Greg Morgan	1,162	48.6	−6
Labour	Celine Frances Maguire	793	33.2	+9
Liberal Democrats	Glenda Charlesworth	286	12.0	−9
UKIP	Hilda Freeman	148	6.2	N/A
Majority		369	15.4	−15
Turnout		2,389	41	−19
Conservative hold		Swing	−7.5	

=== Clayton le Woods North ward ===
Clayton le Woods North
Party	Candidate	Votes	%	±%
Labour	✓ Steve Murfitt	891	45.0	+11
Conservative	Mike Devaney	716	36.1	−2
UKIP	Mark Rhodes	213	10.8	+11
Liberal Democrats	Stephen John Fenn	161	8.1	−20
Majority		175	8.8	+14
Turnout		1,981	39	−34
Labour gain from Conservative		Swing	+6.5	

=== Clayton le Woods West and Cuerden ===
Clayton le Woods West and Cuerden
Party	Candidate	Votes	%	±%
Labour	✓ Dave Rogerson	801	50.3	+5
Conservative	Judith Boothman	655	41.1	−14
UKIP	Paul Freeman	137	8.6	N/A
Majority		146	9.2	+18
Turnout		1,593	48.0	−22
Labour gain from Conservative		Swing	+9.5	

=== Coppull ward ===
Coppull
Party	Candidate	Votes	%	±%
Labour	✓ Matthew Crow	1,141	54.7	+22
Liberal Democrats	Nora Ball	682	32.7	−17
Conservative	Sandra Mercer	262	12.6	−5
Majority		459	22.0	+38
Turnout		2,085	44.0	−23
Labour gain from Liberal Democrats		Swing	+19.5	

=== Eccleston and Mawdesley ward ===
Eccleston and Mawdesley
Party	Candidate	Votes	%	±%
Conservative	✓ Kevin Joyce	1,247	56.9	−1
Labour	Stan Ely	945	43.1	+1
Majority		302	13.8	−1
Turnout		2,192	47.0	−26
Conservative hold		Swing	−1	

=== Euxton South ward ===
Euxton South
Party	Candidate	Votes	%	±%
Conservative	✓ Peter Goldsworthy	734	50.4	−10
Labour	Mark Jarnell	593	40.7	+1
UKIP	Mrs. Denise Hogan	130	8.9	N/A
Majority		141	9.7	−10
Turnout		1,457	46.0	−25
Conservative hold		Swing	−5.5	

=== Lostock ward ===
Lostock
Party	Candidate	Votes	%	±%
Conservative	✓ Doreen Dickinson	699	43.4	−14
Independent	John Forrest	604	37.5	N/A
Labour	Michael Gaskill	309	19.2	+20
Majority		95	5.9	−−8
Turnout		1,612	47.0	+3
Conservative hold		Swing	−25.5	
