= 2006 Chorley Borough Council election =

2006 UK local government election

Elections to Chorley Borough Council were held on 4 May 2006. One third of the council was up for election and the Conservative party gained overall control of the council from no overall control.

After the election, the composition of the council was:

Party	Seats	±
Conservative	25	▲5
Labour	17	▼4
Independent	3	Steady
Liberal Democrat	2	▼1

== Election result ==
Chorley local election result 2006
Party	Seats	Gains	Losses	Net gain/loss	Seats %	Votes %	Votes	+/−
Conservative	11	5	0	▲5	61.1	45.0	12,037	+9.0
Labour	5	0	4	▼4	27.8	35.7	9,555	+1.7
Liberal Democrats	1	0	1	▼1	5.6	9.5	2,552	−8.6
Independent	1	0	0	Steady	5.6	8.7	2,312	−3.2
New Party	0	0	0	Steady	0	1.0	272	+1.0

One Labour councillor was unopposed.

== Results Map ==
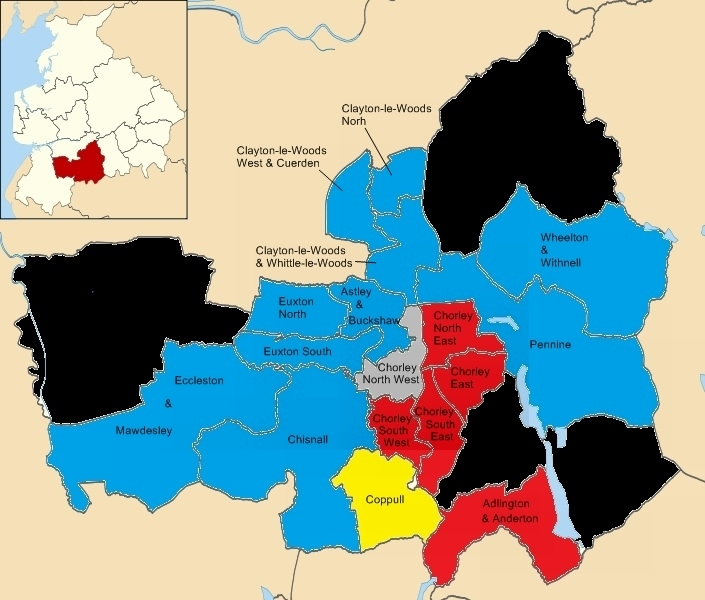
2006 results

== Ward results ==
=== Adlington and Anderton ward ===
Adlington and Anderton
Party	Candidate	Votes	%	±%
Labour	✓ Catherine Hoyle	1,264	57.1	+13.3
Conservative	Paul Barron	700	31.6	−7.9
Liberal Democrats	Philip William Pilling	249	11.3	−5.5
Majority		564	25.5	+21.2
Turnout		2,213	39.5	
Labour hold		Swing		

=== Astley and Buckshaw ward ===
Astley and Buckshaw
Party	Candidate	Votes	%	±%
Conservative	✓ Alan Cain	832	66.4	+8.2
Labour	Laura Jane Lennox	421	33.6	+1.6
Majority		411	32.8	+6.6
Turnout		1,253	45.5	
Conservative gain from Labour		Swing		

=== Chisnall ward ===
Chisnall
Party	Candidate	Votes	%	±%
Conservative	✓ Harold Heaton	701	55.7	+19.9
Liberal Democrats	Nora Theresa Ball	319	25.4	+9.1
Labour	David Christopher Lloyd	238	18.9	−11.7
Majority		382	30.3	+25.1
Turnout		1,258	39.0	
Conservative hold		Swing		

=== Chorley East ward ===
Chorley East
Party	Candidate	Votes	%	±%
Labour	✓ Hasina Khan	798	56.9	+5.0
Conservative	Simon Parkinson	605	43.1	+20.9
Majority		193	13.8	−15.9
Turnout		1,403	29.2	
Labour hold		Swing		

=== Chorley North East ward ===
Chorley North East
Party	Candidate	Votes	%	±%
Labour	✓ Dennis Edgerley	816	51.8	+10.5
Conservative	Marlene Ann Bedford	486	30.9	+2.9
New Party	Colin Denby	272	17.3	+17.3
Majority		330	20.9	+10.3
Turnout		1,574	31.5	
Labour hold		Swing		

=== Chorley North West ward ===
Chorley North West
Party	Candidate	Votes	%	±%
Independent	✓ Ralph Snape	2,312	85.3	+8.3
Labour	Alistair Ward Bradley	203	7.5	+7.5
Conservative	Kirk Houghton	197	7.3	−5.3
Majority		2,109	77.8	+13.4
Turnout		2,712	54.5	
Independent hold		Swing		

=== Chorley South East ward ===
Chorley South East
Party	Candidate	Votes	%	±%
Labour	✓ Thomas McGowan	625	42.9	−2.2
Conservative	Barbara Higham	612	42.0	+7.3
Liberal Democrats	David Porter	219	15.0	−5.2
Majority		13	0.9	−9.5
Turnout		1,456	31.4	
Labour hold		Swing		

=== Chorley South West ward ===
Chorley South West
Party	Candidate	Votes	%	±%
Labour	✓ Roy Lees	unopposed		
Labour hold		Swing		

=== Clayton le Woods and Whittle-le-Woods ward ===
Clayton le Woods and Whittle-le-Woods
Party	Candidate	Votes	%	±%
Conservative	✓ James Bell	1,268	64.8	+13.4
Labour	David Edwin Rogerson	362	18.5	−4.5
Liberal Democrats	Glenda Charlesworth	327	16.7	−8.9
Majority		941	46.3	+20.5
Turnout		1,957	36.7	
Conservative hold		Swing		

=== Clayton le Woods North ward ===
Clayton le Woods North (2)
Party	Candidate	Votes	%	±%
Conservative	✓ Margaret Cullens	713		
Conservative	✓ Peter Baker	661		
Labour	Karen Teresa Martyniuk	561		
Labour	Edward Anthony Murphy	484		
Liberal Democrats	Andrew Peter Philip Buckley	420		
Turnout		2,839	30.0	
Conservative gain from Liberal Democrats		Swing		
Conservative hold		Swing		

=== Clayton le Woods West and Cuerden ===
Clayton le Woods and Cuerden
Party	Candidate	Votes	%	±%
Conservative	✓ Michael Joseph Muncaster	793	60.1	+18.1
Labour	James Freeman	526	39.9	+2.2
Majority		267	20.2	+15.9
Turnout		1,319	38.1	
Conservative gain from Labour		Swing		

=== Coppull ward ===
Coppull
Party	Candidate	Votes	%	±%
Liberal Democrats	✓ Kenneth William Ball	907	54.4	+6.0
Labour	Susan Elizabeth Millar	521	31.2	−8.2
Conservative	Stephen William Royce	240	14.4	+2.2
Majority		386	23.2	+14.2
Turnout		1,668	33.4	
Liberal Democrats hold		Swing		

=== Eccleston and Mawdesley ward ===
Eccleston and Mawdesley
Party	Candidate	Votes	%	±%
Conservative	✓ Keith Iddon	1,176	54.1	+0.3
Labour	Alan Whittaker	998	45.9	−0.3
Majority		178	8.2	+0.6
Turnout		2,174	45.6	
Conservative gain from Labour		Swing	+0.3	

=== Euxton North ward ===
Euxton North
Party	Candidate	Votes	%	±%
Conservative	✓ Rosemary Russell	833	53.7	+0.4
Labour	Thomas Gray	718	46.3	−0.4
Majority		115	7.4	+0.8
Turnout		1,551	43.5	
Conservative gain from Labour		Swing	+0.4	

=== Euxton South ward ===
Euxton South
Party	Candidate	Votes	%	±%
Conservative	✓ Geoffrey Russell	836	67.6	+10.4
Labour	Helen Margaret Bradley	401	32.4	−10.4
Majority		435	35.2	+20.8
Turnout		1,237	38.2	
Conservative hold		Swing		

=== Pennine ward ===
Pennine
Party	Candidate	Votes	%	±%
Conservative	✓ Marie Elizabeth Gray	498	65.2	+10.2
Labour	Hollie Louise Berry	155	20.3	+5.1
Liberal Democrats	Janet Ross-Mills	111	14.5	−15.3
Majority		343	44.9	+19.7
Turnout		764	43.5	
Conservative hold		Swing		

=== Wheelton and Withnell ward ===
Wheelton and Withnell
Party	Candidate	Votes	%	±%
Conservative	✓ Iris Elaine Smith	886	65.6	+18.5
Labour	Christopher Howard	464	34.4	+2.2
Majority		422	31.2	+16.3
Turnout		1,350	41.6	
Conservative hold		Swing		
