= Listed buildings in Brindle, Lancashire =

Brindle is a civil parish in the Borough of Chorley, Lancashire, England. The parish contains 26 buildings that are recorded in the National Heritage List for England as designated listed buildings. Of these, two are listed at Grade II*, the middle grade, and the others are at Grade II, the lowest grade. Apart from the village of Brindle, the parish is mainly rural, and a high proportion of the listed buildings are, or originated as, farmhouses or farm buildings. The Leeds and Liverpool Canal passes through the parish, as does the disused southern section of the Lancaster Canal, and there are listed buildings associated with both of these. The other listed buildings are churches and houses, and structures associated with them.

== Key ==
| Grade | Criteria |
|---|---|
| II* | Particularly important buildings of more than special interest |
| II | Buildings of national importance and special interest |

== Buildings ==
| Name and location | Photograph | Date | Notes | Grade |
|---|---|---|---|---|
| St James' Church; 53.71343°N 2.60883°W | | c. 1500 | The oldest part of the church is the tower, the nave was built in 1817, and the chancel was rebuilt in 1869–70. Most of the church is constructed in sandstone, with the nave in gritstone, and the roof in slate. It consists of a nave with a south porch, a chancel with a north chapel, and a west tower. The tower is in Perpendicular style, it has a west doorway, a southeast stair turret, and a clock face. At the top is a battlemented parapet, gargoyles, and crocketed corner pinnacles. | II |
| Hough House Farmhouse; 53.70184°N 2.62045°W | — | 16th century (possible) | The farmhouse was altered in the 17th century and later. It is cruck-framed, and in sandstone with a slate roof. The farmhouse has 1 1/2 storeys and a three-bay front. There are gabled porches on the front and at the rear. Some of the windows are mullioned, and at the rear is a gabled dormer. Inside is a full cruck truss. | II |
| Mill House Farmhouse (northern half); 53.72483°N 2.61804°W | — | 17th century | The farmhouse is cruck-framed with sandstone cladding, rendered at the front, and with a slate roof. It has two storeys and two bays. The interior contains a full cruck truss, an inglenook fireplace, and a bressumer. | II |
| Tullis Farmhouse; 53.70964°N 2.61898°W | — | 17th century | A farmhouse that was later extended to the left. It is in sandstone with slate roofs and is in two storeys. Both the older and the later parts have two bays, the later part being larger. On the front is a gabled single-storey porch. Some of the windows are mullioned and others are casements. Inside is an inglenook and a bressumer. | II |
| Breworth Fold Farmhouse; 53.70353°N 2.60420°W | — | Late 17th century | The farmhouse was extended in the 18th century. It is in sandstone with a slate roof, it has two storeys, and is in an L-shaped plan. The original part has two bays, with a later two-bay wing added to the front of the right bay. At the rear are two outshuts. Some of the windows are mullioned, and others have been altered. | II |
| Huggarts Farmhouse; 53.69688°N 2.62312°W | — | Late 17th century (probable) | The farmhouse is in rendered sandstone with a slate roof. It has two storeys and three bays with a wide gabled porch on the front. There is one mullioned window, some sash windows, and other windows that have been altered. Inside the farmhouse is a timber-framed partition with wattle and daub infill. | II |
| Marsh Lane Farmhouse; 53.71275°N 2.59442°W | — | Late 17th century | The farmhouse was extended to the right in the 18th century. It is in sandstone with a roof of slate and stone-slate. There are two storeys and three bays. Some of the windows are mullioned; others have been altered. | II |
| Head o'th' Marsh Farmhouse; 53.71890°N 2.58702°W | | 1692 | A sandstone farmhouse with a slate roof, it is in two storeys and has a three-bay front. The lintel of the inner doorway contains the letter "G" in relief. Almost all the windows are mullioned. At the rear is a two-storey gabled porch, probably added in the 19th century, with a Celtic head in the apex of the gable coping. Inside is an inglenook bressumer. | II* |
| Bury Farmhouse; 53.70517°N 2.62781°W | — | 1699 | A farmhouse with a former farm building incorporated on the left, it is in sandstone with a slate roof. There are two storeys, and the original farmhouse has three bays. The doorway has a moulded surround, and above it is a large lintel, a moulded cornice, and a datestone. The windows are mullioned. Inside is an inglenook fireplace, a bressumer, and a timber-framed partition. | II |
| 1 and 2 Chapel Fold; 53.73302°N 2.60508°W | — | c. 1700 | A farmhouse, later converted into two cottages, in sandstone with tiled roofs, part of which was formerly used as a Roman Catholic chapel. They are in two storeys and three bays, and have mullioned windows. Inside are the remains of a timber-framed partition. The garden wall is included in the listing. | II |
| Barn, Hough House Farm; 53.70201°N 2.62035°W | — | 1717 | The barn was possibly raised in 1880. It is in sandstone with a slate roof, and has three bays. The barn has a wagon entrance and a doorway at both ends. | II |
| Jack Green Fold Farmhouse; 53.72634°N 2.61280°W | — | 1721 | A former farmhouse in sandstone with a slate roof. It has two storeys and two bays. Some of the windows are mullioned; others have been altered. | II |
| 3 Chapel Fold; 53.73302°N 2.60447°W | — | Early 18th century | A farmhouse, later a house, incorporating part of an older, larger cruck-framed structure. It is built in sandstone and red brick, partly rendered, with a slate roof. The house has two storeys and three bays, with an outshut at the rear of the first bay. The windows are mullioned. Inside are two full cruck trusses. | II |
| Beech House; 53.71264°N 2.60832°W | — | Early 18th century | A sandstone house with a slate roof, in two storeys and with three bays. The doorway has a moulded surround and a concave cornice. There are three windows in each storey, initially mullioned, but late altered. At the rear are two outshuts. | II |
| Duxon Hill Farmhouse; 53.72565°N 2.59648°W | — | 1737 | The farmhouse is in sandstone with stone-slate roofs, and has two storeys and two bays. The windows are casements. The stable on the left side contains some fabric from a 17th-century house, including a mullioned window. | II |
| Little Holt Farmhouse; 53.70713°N 2.62396°W | — | Mid 18th century (probable) | The former farmhouse is in sandstone with some brick and has a tiled roof. There are two storeys and a symmetrical three-bay front, and a service wing at the rear of the third bay. The doorway has a moulded architrave. The windows have fluted keystones in the lintels, and contain altered glazing. | II |
| Sundial; 53.71330°N 2.60871°W | — | 18th century (probable) | The sundial is in the churchyard of St James' Church. It is in stone with a square base. On this is a square chamfered shaft with saucer-shaped depressors near the top. On the top is a brass plate and a scrolled gnomon. | II |
| Presbytery; 53.73308°N 2.60519°W | — | 1786 | The presbytery is attached to the south end of St Joseph's Church. It is in stone with a slate roof, in three storeys and two bays. The elliptical-headed doorway has a moulded architrave with imposts, keystones, and a fanlight. Some windows are sashes and others are casements. | II |
| Bateson's Farmhouse and barn 53.71613°N 2.60449°W | — | 1793 | The farmhouse and the barn attached to the right are in sandstone with slate roofs. The house has two storeys and a three-bay front. Over the doorway is a moulded frieze and cornice, and above it is a datestone. The barn is set back and at a lower level. It contains a square-headed wagon entrance with long and short jamb stones and splayed voussoirs. | II |
| Brindle Lodge; 53.73479°N 2.60315°W | | c. 1808 | A country house that was refurbished in 1869. It is in sandstone with some red brick, it has a slate roof, and is in Classical style. The house has an L-shaped plan, consisting of a front range and a service wing at the rear. There are two storeys and a symmetrical seven-bay front, in the centre of which is a porch with unfluted Ionic columns. The windows are sashes, and inside the house is a circular entrance hall with a dome, and fine plasterwork. | II* |
| Summit Bridge; 53.71437°N 2.62832°W | | c. 1815 | An accommodation bridge over the disused southern section of the Lancaster Canal. It is in sandstone and consists of an elliptical arch with a keystone, voussoirs, and a parapet. The bridge has a humped deck with boulder paving. | II |
| Top Lock House; 53.68721°N 2.61309°W | | c. 1816 (probable) | Originally a lock keeper's house with attached office, it is in sandstone with a stone-slate roof, and stands adjacent to Johnsons Hillocks Locks on the Leeds and Liverpool Canal. The building is on a slope, with two storeys at the front and three at the back, it has a symmetrical front of three bays, with a single-storey lean-to extension on the left. The windows are sashes. | II |
| St Joseph's Church; 53.73320°N 2.60515°W | | 1832 | A Roman Catholic church, enlarged twice later in the century. It is in sandstone with a slate roof, and is in simple Classical style. The church has six bays containing round-headed windows and a south transept. The entrance front is pedimented, and contains a round-headed entrance with rusticated voussoirs, a Venetian window, and the datestone of 1786 from an earlier building. Inside are two screens, one in Corinthian style, and the other Jacobean. | II |
| Folly; 53.73454°N 2.60004°W | — | Early to mid 19th century | The folly is in the grounds of Brindle Lodge and is in the form of a small circular tower about 5 metres (16 ft) high. It is built in red brick, sandstone, and gritstone. It contains two archways, an arched window, and fragments from elsewhere including a datestone inscribed with 1639. | II |
| Milepost; 53.70949°N 2.58624°W | — | Early to mid 19th century | The milepost is by the towpath of the Leeds and Liverpool Canal. It is in stone, triangular in section with a pointed head, and is about 0.5 metres (1 ft 8 in) high. On its sides are cast iron plates containing lettering showing the distances in miles to Leeds and Liverpool. | II |
| Milepost; 53.69810°N 2.60035°W | — | Early to mid 19th century | The milepost is by the towpath of the Leeds and Liverpool Canal. It is in stone, triangular in section with a pointed head, and is about 0.5 metres (1 ft 8 in) high. On its sides are cast iron plates containing lettering showing the distances in miles to Leeds and Liverpool. | II |
