= St James' Church, Brindle =

Coordinates: 53.7134°N 2.6088°W

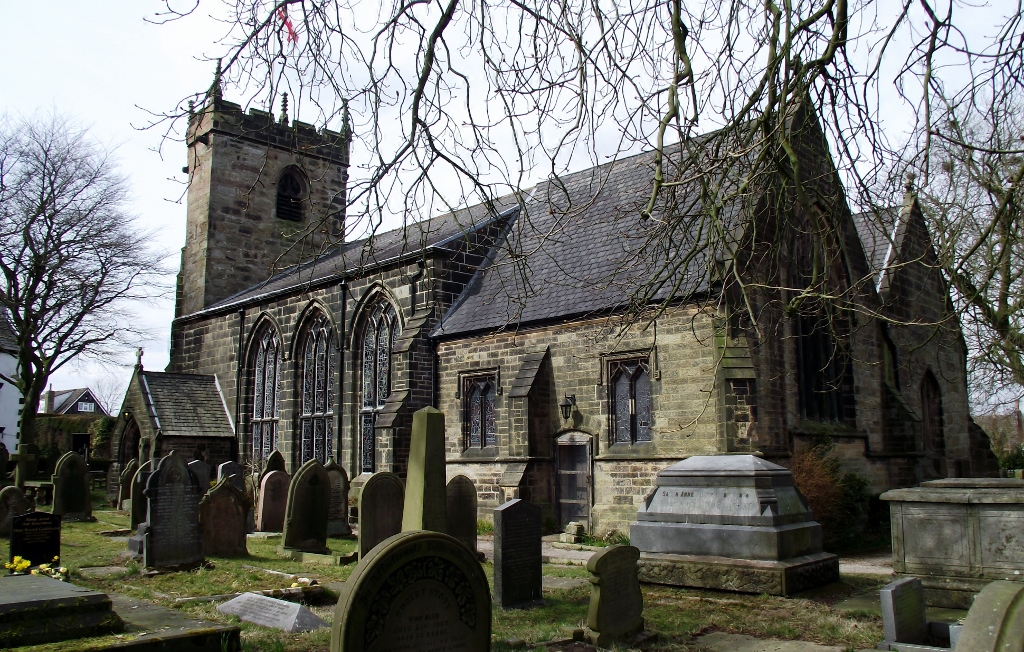
- St James' Church, Brindle, from the southeast

- Location in the Borough of Chorley
- OS grid reference: SD 599,243
- Location: Brindle, Lancashire
- Country: England
- Denomination: Anglican
- Website: St James, Brindle

History
- Status: Parish church

Architecture
- Functional status: Active
- Heritage designation: Grade II
- Designated: 17 April 1967
- Architect: E. G. Paley (chancel)
- Architectural type: Church
- Style: Gothic, Gothic Revival

Specifications
- Materials: Sandstone and gritstone, slate roofs

Administration
- Province: York
- Diocese: Blackburn
- Archdeaconry: Blackburn
- Deanery: Chorley
- Parish: Brindle

Clergy
- Rector: Revd Jon Price

St James' Church is in the village of Brindle, Lancashire, England. It is an active Anglican parish church in the deanery of Chorley, the archdeaconry of Blackburn, and the diocese of Blackburn. The church is recorded in the National Heritage List for England as a designated Grade II listed building.

== History ==
The church dates back to at least the 12th century, when its rector in 1190 is recorded as being named Ughtred. Before the Reformation the church was dedicated to Saint Helen. The tower of the present church was built in about 1500. The nave was built in 1817, incorporating the former north aisle, and in the process removing the galleries. The chancel was rebuilt in 1869–70 by the Lancaster architect E. G. Paley.

== Architecture ==
=== Exterior ===
Most of the church is constructed in sandstone, with the nave in dressed gritstone. The roofs are in slate. Its plan consists of a west tower, a four-bay nave that extends to the north of the tower, a south porch, and a two-bay chancel with a chapel to its north. The tower is in Perpendicular style, is in four stages, and has diagonal buttresses, and a stair turret to the southeast. In the bottom stage is a west doorway with a Tudor arch, above which is a three-light window, and a clock face. The top stage contains two-light louvred bell openings with Perpendicular tracery. On the summit of the tower is a battlemented parapet, gargoyles, and crocketed corner pinnacles.

On the south side of the nave is a gabled porch and three large arched windows, and on the south side of the chancel are square-headed two-light windows. The east window has five lights with Perpendicular tracery. In the east wall of the north chapel is a Tudor-arched three-light window, and on the north side is a square-headed three-light window. Set against the east wall of the chapel are three medieval gravestones carved with crosses.

=== Interior ===
The font consists of a small square tub. Above the south door are the Royal arms of George III. On the tower wall are two benefaction boards. Also in the church is a brass chandelier dating from 1792. The stained glass includes a window depicting apostles by Shrigley and Hunt, probably dating from the early 20th century. The organ was built in 1817 by James Davis. There is a ring of six bells. Two of these were cast in about 1530 by John Woolley, the others dating from 1904 by John Taylor & Co.

== External features ==
In the churchyard is a sundial, dating probably from the 18th century, that is listed at Grade II. The churchyard also contains the war graves of five soldiers of World War I, and an airman and a Pioneer Corps officer of World War II.

== See also ==
- Listed buildings in Brindle, Lancashire
- List of ecclesiastical works by E. G. Paley
