= St Peter's Church, Mawdesley =

Coordinates: 53.6236°N 2.7732°W

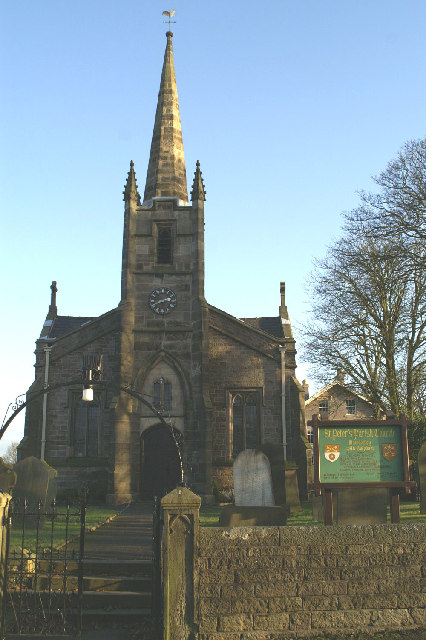
- St Peter's Church, Mawdesley, from the west

- Location in the Borough of Chorley
- OS grid reference: SD 489,143
- Location: Church Lane, Mawdesley, Lancashire
- Country: England
- Denomination: Anglican
- Website: St Peter Mawdesley

History
- Status: Parish church

Architecture
- Functional status: Active
- Heritage designation: Grade II
- Designated: 30 January 1987
- Architect(s): Edmund Sharpe, Peter Balmer, Richard Knill Freeman
- Architectural type: Church
- Style: Gothic Revival
- Groundbreaking: 1839
- Completed: 1892

Specifications
- Materials: Sandstone, slate roof

Administration
- Province: York
- Diocese: Blackburn
- Archdeaconry: Blackburn
- Deanery: Chorley
- Parish: St Peter, Mawdesley

Clergy
- Rector: Revd David J. Reynolds

St Peter's Church is in High Street in the village of Mawdesley, Lancashire, England. It is an active Anglican parish church in the deanery of Chorley, the archdeaconry of Blackburn, and the diocese of Blackburn. The church is recorded in the National Heritage List for England as a designated Grade II listed building.

== History ==
St Peter's was designed in 1838, and built in 1839–40 to a design by the Lancaster architect Edmund Sharpe. Its estimated cost in 1839 was £950 (equivalent to £90,000 in 2025). The land was given by Sir Thomas D. Hesketh. When first built, the church had seating for 400 people. The chancel was added in 1878–79 by Peter Balmer, an architect from Ormskirk, and in 1892 the church was restored by Richard Knill Freeman.

== Architecture ==
The church is constructed in sandstone with a slate roof. Its plan consists of a five-bay nave, a chancel, and a slender west tower that is partly embraced by the nave. The westernmost bay of the nave on the north side is gabled and contains lancet windows; its counterpart on the south has an arched doorway. The other bays are separated by buttresses and each contains a tall square-headed two-light window. The east window has five lights and is in Perpendicular style. The tower has diagonal buttresses. Its first stage is tall and originally had open arches on each side; these have been filled in and incorporate windows and a west door. Above is a single-light louvred bell-opening on each face, then a stepped parapet with crocketted pinnacles. It is surmounted by a slender octagonal spire. Inside the church is a west gallery supported by two cast iron columns. The organ was built in about 1900 by Wilkinson and Sons of Kendal. The church is similar in design to the nearby Church of St John the Baptist, Bretherton designed by Sharpe at about the same time.

== External features ==
The churchyard contains the war graves of three soldiers of World War I, and an airman of World War II.

== See also ==
- Listed buildings in Mawdesley
- List of architectural works by Edmund Sharpe
