= Listed buildings in Heapey =

Heapey is a civil parish in the Borough of Chorley, Lancashire, England. The parish contains 14 buildings that are recorded in the National Heritage List for England as designated listed buildings. Of these, one is listed at Grade II*, the middle grade, and the others are at Grade II, the lowest grade. Other than part of the village of Wheelton, the parish is almost completely rural, and a high proportion of the listed buildings are, or originated as, farmhouses or farm buildings. The other listed buildings are a church and a structure in the churchyard, a canal lock, and a war memorial on the form of a clock tower.

== Key ==
Grade	Criteria
II*	Particularly important buildings of more than special interest
II	Buildings of national importance and special interest

== Buildings ==
Name and location	Photograph	Date	Notes	Grade
Critchley's Farmhouse; 53.68013°N 2.61046°W	—	Early 17th century (probable)	The west part of the former farmhouse is listed, it is in sandstone with a stone-slate roof. There are two bays and 1 1/2 storeys, with a modern porch attached to the second bay. The windows are altered casements. Inside there is a timber-framed partition with wattle and daub infill.	II
Wogden's Farmhouse; 53.67238°N 2.59853°W	—	Mid to late 17th century	A sandstone farmhouse with s stone-slate roof, later enlarged. It has two storeys, and the original part has two bays, with later outshuts. There are remains of mullioned windows, and elsewhere the fenestration is varied. Inside is a large inglenook, a bressumer, and some wattle and daub infill.	II
Causeway House Farmhouse; 53.66947°N 2.59030°W	—	Late 17th century (probable)	A sandstone farmhouse with a slate roof, it has two storeys and three bays. There are two plain doorways, and the glazing has been altered. Inside is an inglenook, a bressumer, and timber-framed partitions, one of which has wattle and daub infill.	II
Warth Farmhouse; 53.66694°N 2.58499°W		Late 17th century (probable)	The former farmhouse is in sandstone with a stone-slate roof. The original part has two storeys and two bays. There is a two-storey extension to the left, and a single-storey stable on the right. Some of the windows are mullioned, others have been replaced with casements.	II
Lower House Fold Farmhouse and barn 53.67886°N 2.58135°W	—	1692	The farmhouse and barn are in sandstone with slate roofs. The house has two storeys with an attic, and two bays with a rear outshut. Some windows are mullioned, others have been altered with casements. Inside is an inglenook and a bressumer. The barn to the west contains a cruck truss that is probably medieval.	II
Morris Farmhouse; 53.66504°N 2.59010°W	—	1693	A sandstone farmhouse with a stone-slate roof, it has 2 1/2 bays and 2 1/2 storeys. The doorway is at the right end, and has a moulded doorcase over which is an inscribed panel and a hood mould. Most of the windows are mullioned, and there are also some arched windows. Inside are an inglenook, a bressumer, and timber-framed partitions with wattle and daub infill.	II*
Cliff Farmhouse; 53.65959°N 2.58851°W		1696	A sandstone former farmhouse with a tiled roof, in two storeys and an attic. It has 2 1/2 bays, a lean-to extension at the left, and a single-storey wing at the rear. The doorway at the left end has a lintel inscribed with the date. The windows, previously mullioned, contain casements, with one mullion remaining. Inside is an inglenook fireplace, a bressumer, and timber-framed partitions.	II
Eagle Tower Farmhouse; 53.67759°N 2.60410°W	—	1704	The original part of the former farmhouse is in rendered sandstone and has a red tiled roof. It is in a single bay and has two storeys. Above the doorway is a shaped and inscribed lintel and a hood mould. In the ground floor is a six-light mullioned window, with modern windows above. Inside is an inglenook and a bressumer. The modern extension to the north is not included in the listing.	II
Barn and shippon, Eagle Tower Farm; 53.67741°N 2.60417°W	—	1704	The barn and shippon are in sandstone with slate roofs. They have a T-shaped plan, and were originally in three bays, with later outshuts. They contain a datestone, wagon entrances, doorways, and a window.	II
176 Blackburn Road and barn 53.68429°N 2.60829°W	—	18th century (probable)	The house and barn are in sandstone with slate roofs. The house, originally in two bays, had another bay added to the left. It has two storeys and an attic, and the barn is attached to the right. The windows were formerly mullioned, and have been replaced by casements.	II
St Barnabas' Church; 53.67956°N 2.60418°W		1752	The oldest part of the church is the nave, which was extended in 1829. The chancel and transepts were added in 1865, and the roof was replaced in 1898. The church is built in sandstone with a slate roof. The original part of the nave is in simple Georgian style with large round-headed mullioned and transomed windows. The windows in the transepts and chancel are in Decorated style, and there are wheel windows in the transepts and at the west end.	II
Rotunda; 53.67914°N 2.60425°W		1776	The rotunda bellcote is in the churchyard of St Barnabas' Church, and was formerly in the grounds of Prospect House, Wheelton. It is in gritstone, and consists of six squat Tuscan columns on a square rusticated base. At the top are an inscribed frieze, a moulded cornice, and a domed roof.	II
Top Lock; 53.68705°N 2.61311°W		1816	This is the top of seven locks linking the Leeds and Liverpool Canal with the southern branch of the Lancaster Canal. It is built in gritstone, and has wooden gates with iron sluices, and a wooden footbridge. Its lower entrance and the other six locks are in the parish of Whittle-le-Woods.	II
Clock tower 53.68576°N 2.60702°W		1922	The clock tower was built as a war memorial in Gothic style. It is a square tower in gritstone and has circular clock faces and hood moulds on all sides, and at the top is a corbel table, pierced battlements, and a slate spirelet with a weathervane. On the east side there is also a doorway and a rectangular panel containing an inscribed metal plate.	II
