= Heapey =

Village in Lancashire, England

Coordinates: 53.676°N 2.597°W

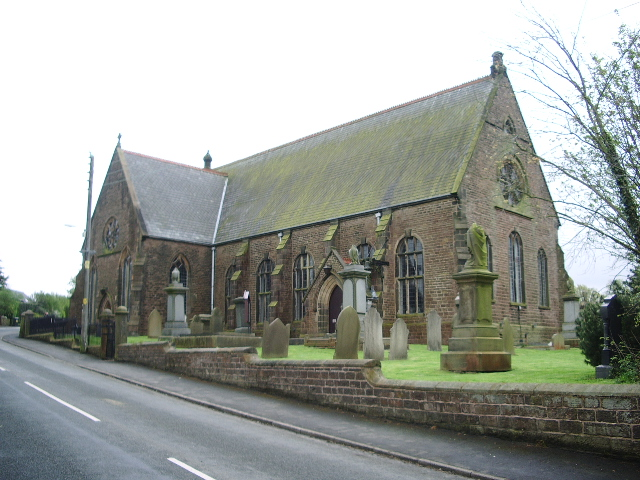
- Parish Church of St Barnabas, Heapey

- Shown within Chorley Borough Location within Lancashire
- Population: 1,001 (2011 Census)
- OS grid reference: SD606201
- Civil parish: Heapey
- District: Chorley
- Shire county: Lancashire
- Region: North West
- Country: England
- Sovereign state: United Kingdom
- Post town: CHORLEY
- Postcode district: PR6
- Dialling code: 01257
- Police: Lancashire
- Fire: Lancashire
- Ambulance: North West
- UK Parliament: Chorley

Heapey is a village and civil parish of the Borough of Chorley, in Lancashire, England. The village is two miles from Chorley and on the western fringe of the West Pennine Moors. In 2001 the population was 955, increasing to 1,001 at the 2011 census.

== History ==
Heapey derives from the Old English heope a rose, or heap a hill and hege a hedge meaning a rose hedge or hedge on the hill. It was recorded as Hepeie in 1219. There are ancient earthworks near Heapey and Roman coins were discovered in 1835.

Heapey was part of Gunolfsmoors an area between Leyland and Blackburn claimed by a Viking, Gunnolf, in the 10th century. It emerged in the Middle Ages as Hepay in 1260. The lordship was held by the De Ollertons including Ranulph who assumed the Hepay name.

Robert de Hepay sold the lordship to the Standishes, and the manor or lordship remained with them. In 1924, the principal landowners were the trustees of Mrs. Paulet and Mrs. Sumner Mayhew. There were 34 hearths liable to pay Hearth tax in 1666, although no house had more than three. During the 19th century, many of the population were employed at bleachworks, which have long since been demolished, and quarries.

The Lancashire Union Railway and the Lancashire and Yorkshire Railway (LYR) built a railway line to link the mills of east Lancashire with the coal mines of Wigan. The line opened in 1869. Heapey railway station closed to passengers in 1960.

== Governance ==
In the Middle Ages, Heapey was a township and chapelry closely associated with Wheelton in the parish and hundred of Leyland in Lancashire. In 1837, Heapey joined with other townships (or civil parishes) in the area to form the Chorley Poor Law Union, which took responsibility for the administration and funding of the Poor Law in that area.

Heapey is part of Chorley Borough (which has headquarters at the town hall in Chorley), has a parish council. It is part of the Chorley parliamentary constituency, which elected Lindsay Hoyle as Member of Parliament for the Labour Party in the 2010 general election.

== Geography ==
The ancient township covered 1,464 acres on hilly ground including about 200 acres of moorland rising at the eastern edge to over 1,000 feet on the western fringe of the West Pennine Moors. The village is in the northwest corner between Chorley and Blackburn, the Leeds and Liverpool Canal crosses the north-west corner and the Thirlmere Aqueduct passes through the township.

The Heapey reservoirs are upstream of Anglezarke reservoir starting behind White Coppice cricket club. They feed Black Brook (known as Warth Brook upstream), a tributary of the River Yarrow. They are not part of the drinking water system. To the south is Healey Nab.

== Population ==
Population in Heapey 1881–1961
Year	1881	1891	1901	1911	1921	1931	1951	1961
Population	369	497	543	606	515	504	422	481
Heapey CP/Tn

== Religion ==
The chapelry covered the township of Wheelton. The church of St. Barnabas was first built in 1552, rebuilt in 1740 and enlarged in 1829 and 1867 and restored in 1876 and 1898. The church consists of chancel, nave and transepts and is a Grade II Listed building.

== ROF ==
An ordnance factory was built in Heapey during World War II, which became part of BAE Systems and had an "ammunitions storage facility" and part of ROF Chorley. Although the base was closed in 1990s some planning applications were refused on the basis that the area was within a blast zone. The railway line had sidings that served the site and closed in the 1960s.

A myth grew about a strategic reserve of steam locomotives as at that time the sidings were used to store redundant steam engines. and the site was speculated to be connected with the ordnance site at Euxton.

== See also ==
- Listed buildings in Heapey
