= 2014 Chorley Borough Council election =

2014 UK local government election

The 2014 Chorley Borough Council election took place on 22 May 2014 to elect members of Chorley Borough Council in England. This was on the same day as other local elections. One third of the council was up for election and the Labour Party held control.

== Council make-up ==
After the election, the composition of the council was:

Party political make-up of Chorley Council
Party	Seats				Current Council (2014)
Party	2010	2011	2012	2014	Current Council (2014)
Labour	15	20	24	32	
Conservative	27	23	20	13	
Independent	2	2	2	2	
Lib Dems	3	2	1	0	

== Election result ==
Chorley local election result 2014
Party	Seats	Gains	Losses	Net gain/loss	Seats %	Votes %	Votes	+/−
Labour	13	8	0	▲8	76.5	46.2	13,908	+7.2
Conservative	3	0	7	▼7	17.6	32.2	9,706	−6.8
Independent	1	0	0	Steady	5.9	7.8	2,354	−0.2
UKIP	0	0	0	Steady	0.0	11.5	3,547	+10.5
Liberal Democrats	0	0	1	▼1	0.0	1.4	424	−10.6
Green	0	0	0	Steady	0.0	0.5	160	+0.0

== Results map ==
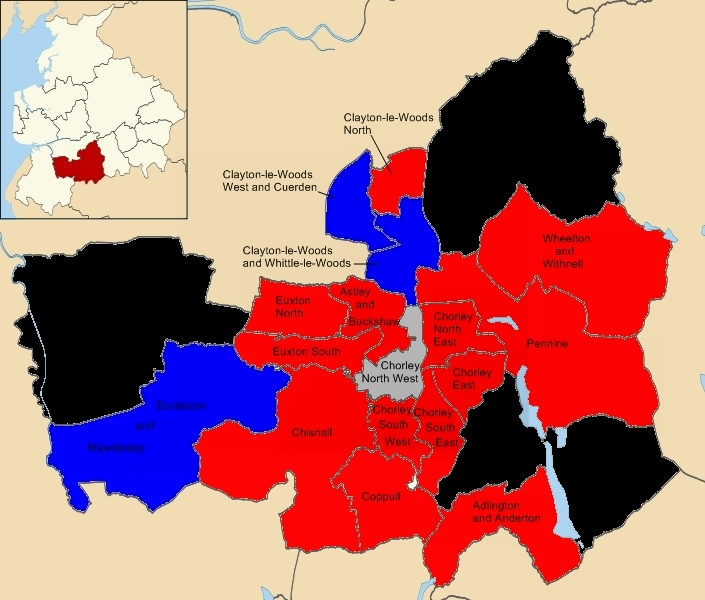
2014 results

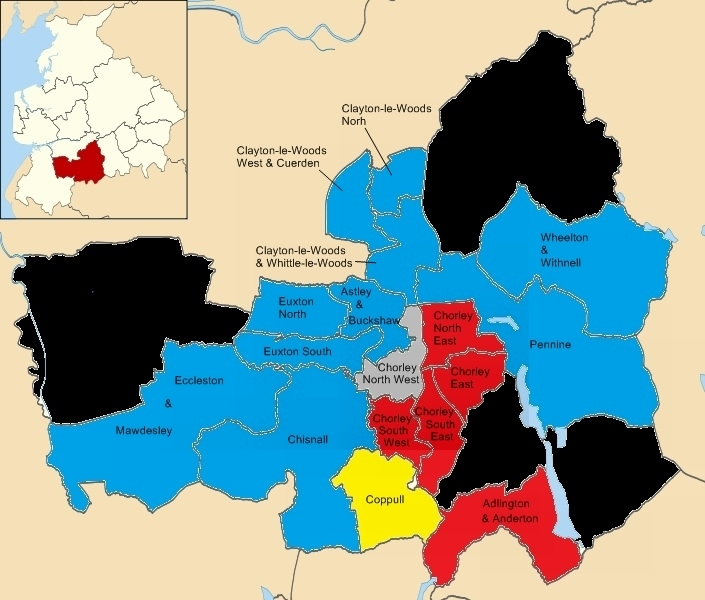
Previous 2010 results

== Ward results ==
=== Adlington and Anderton ===
Adlington and Anderton
Party	Candidate	Votes	%	±%
Labour	Graham Dunn	1,126	48.3	−9.7
Conservative	Charlotte Woods	607	26.1	−3.9
UKIP	Hayden Clewlow	520	22.3	N/A
Liberal Democrats	Philip William Pilling	76	3.3	−9.7
Majority		519	22.3	
Turnout		2,329	40.8	
Labour hold		Swing		

=== Astley and Buckshaw ward ===
Astley and Buckshaw
Party	Candidate	Votes	%	±%
Labour	Matthew John Lynch	788	47.1	+1.1
Conservative	Alan Platt	621	37.1	−16.9
UKIP	Jeffrey Flinders Mallinson	265	15.8	N/A
Majority		167	10.0	
Turnout		1,674	43.0	
Labour gain from Conservative		Swing	+9.0	

=== Chisnall ward ===
Chisnall
Party	Candidate	Votes	%	±%
Labour	Alan Whittaker	848	57.1	+24.1
Conservative	Harold Heaton	637	42.9	−8.1
Majority		211	14.2	
Turnout		1,485	45.7	
Labour gain from Conservative		Swing		

=== Chorley East ward ===
Chorley East
Party	Candidate	Votes	%	±%
Labour	Hasina Khan	1,008	56.9	−1.1
UKIP	Christopher Suart	435	24.6	N/A
Conservative	Alan Cullens	223	12.6	−11.4
Independent	Melville George Coombes	97	5.5	−14.5
Green	Anne Calderbank	18	1.0	N/A
Majority		573	32.4	
Turnout		1,771	36.0	
Labour hold		Swing		

=== Chorley North East ward ===
Chorley North East
Party	Candidate	Votes	%	±%
Labour	Alistair William Morwood	1,162	69.1	−2
Conservative	Matt Hansford	519	30.9	−15
Majority		643	38.2	
Turnout		1,681	35.0	
Labour hold		Swing	+7	

=== Chorley North West ward ===
Chorley North West
Party	Candidate	Votes	%	±%
Independent	Ralph Snape	1,787	72.5	−10.5
Labour	Aaron Beaver	400	16.2	N/A
Conservative	Peter Malpas	276	11.2	−0.9
Majority		1,387	52	
Turnout		2,463	52.2	
Independent hold		Swing		

=== Chorley South East ward ===
Chorley South East
Party	Candidate	Votes	%	±%
Labour	Mrs. Beverley Murray	968	49.0	+3.6
Conservative	Mrs. Sarah Louise Kiley	504	25.5	−9.1
UKIP	David John McManus	392	19.8	N/A
Green	Alistair James Straw	66	3.3	−1.0
Liberal Democrats	David Porter	47	2.4	−13.3
Majority		464	23.5	
Turnout		1,977	36.2	
Labour hold		Swing		

=== Chorley South West ward ===
Chorley South West
Party	Candidate	Votes	%	±%
Labour	Roy Lees	1,184	67.3	+20.3
Conservative	Dominic Keiran Jewell	575	32.7	−0.3
Majority		609	34.6	
Turnout		1,759	30.7	
Labour hold		Swing	+10.6	

=== Clayton le Woods and Whittle le Woods ward ===
Clayton le Woods and Whittle-le-Woods
Party	Candidate	Votes	%	±%
Conservative	Eric Bell	1,409	58.6	+3.6
Labour	Dan Croft	703	41.4	+17.4
Liberal Democrats	Glenda Charlesworth	205	2.4	−18.6
Majority		706	17.3	
Turnout		2,317	36.0	
Conservative hold		Swing		

=== Clayton le Woods North ward ===
Clayton le Woods North
Party	Candidate	Votes	%	±%
Labour	Charlie Bromilow	732	58.4	+24.4
Conservative	Chris Morris	480	41.6	+3.6
UKIP	Raymond McGrady	458	19.8	N/A
Liberal Democrats	Stephen John Fenn	96	2.4	−25.6
Green	Mark Lee	76	9.3	N/A
Majority		289	17	+8
Turnout		1,711	34.5	
Labour gain from Conservative		Swing	+4	

=== Clayton le Woods West and Cuerden ward ===
Clayton le Woods and Cuerden
Party	Candidate	Votes	%	±%
Conservative	Mick Muncaster	736	51.2	−3.8
Labour	Paul Clark	701	48.8	+3.8
Majority		35	2.4	
Turnout		1,437	43.0	
Conservative hold		Swing	−3.8	

=== Coppull ward ===
Coppull
Party	Candidate	Votes	%	±%
Labour	Richard Toon	885	57.3	+24.1
Independent	Kenneth William Ball	470	16.5	N/A
UKIP	Mark Smith	383	19.8	N/A
Conservative	Tom Norris	181	11.3	−5.7
Majority		462	26.1	
Turnout		1,919	39.0	
Labour gain from Liberal Democrats		Swing		

=== Eccleston and Mawdesley ward ===
Eccleston and Mawdesley
Party	Candidate	Votes	%	±%
Conservative	Keith Iddon	944	46.6	−11.4
Labour	Stan Ely	741	42.2	+0.2
UKIP	Richard George Croll	402	11.1	N/A
Majority		203	4.4	−10
Turnout		2,164	43.0	
Conservative hold		Swing	−5.8	

=== Euxton North ward ===
Euxton North
Party	Candidate	Votes	%	±%
Labour	Mike Handley	692	53.8	+6.7
Conservative	Robert Aron Wilding	570	34.9	−12.1
UKIP	Stuart Rickaby	289	11.4	N/A
Majority		122	18.9	
Turnout		1,551	44.3	
Labour gain from Conservative		Swing	+9.4	

=== Euxton South ward ===
Euxton South
Party	Candidate	Votes	%	±%
Labour	Mark Andrew Jarnell	572	40.2	+13.8
Conservative	Debra Platt	569	40.0	−25.1
UKIP	David Smithies	283	19.9	N/A
Majority		3	0.2	
Turnout		1,424	44.7	
Labour gain from Conservative		Swing	+19.5	

=== Pennine ===
Pennine
Party	Candidate	Votes	%	±%
Labour	Gordon France	354	44.3	+6.3
Conservative	Marie Elizabeth Gray	325	40.7	−21.3
UKIP	Tom Shorrock	120	15.0	N/A
Majority		29	3.6	
Turnout		799	46.0	
Labour gain from Conservative		Swing		

=== Wheelton and Withnell ward ===
Wheelton and Withnell
Party	Candidate	Votes	%	±%
Labour	Margaret Mary France	1,044	66.3	+19.1
Conservative	Alison Marie Hansford	530	33.7	−19.1
Majority		514	32.7	
Turnout		1,574	49.4	
Labour gain from Conservative		Swing	+19.1	
