= Listed buildings in Wheelton =

Wheelton is a civil parish in the Borough of Chorley, Lancashire, England. It contains twelve buildings that are recorded in the National Heritage List for England as designated listed buildings, all of which are listed at Grade II. This grade is the lowest of the three gradings given to listed buildings and is applied to "buildings of national importance and special interest". Apart from the villages of Wheelton and Higher Wheelton, the parish is rural, and many of the listed building are, or originated as, farmhouses and farm buildings. The Leeds and Liverpool Canal passes through the parish, and associated with this are three listed bridges. The other listed buildings are two sets of weavers' cottages.

== Buildings ==
Name and location	Photograph	Date	Notes
Hill House; 53.68543°N 2.60351°W	—	17th century	Originally a farmhouse, with a house added to the front in the 19th century to make a single dwelling. The building is in sandstone with slate roofs. The older part has two storeys and three bays with the remains of mullioned windows. The newer part is also in two storeys, but higher, and has altered windows.
Barn, Flash Green Farm; 53.69619°N 2.58941°W	—	1669	The barn is in sandstone with a slate roof. It has four bays, and contains a wagon entrance, a doorway, and ventilation slits.
Flash Green Farmhouse; 53.69598°N 2.58935°W		Late 17th century (probable)	The former farmhouse was extended on a number of occasions, including the addition of a loomshop in the 18th century. It is in sandstone with tiled roofs, and has two storeys. The building has a T-shaped plan, consisting of a four-bay main range and two short wings on the west side. On the front is a lean-to porch, and many of the windows are mullioned. Inside are two inglenooks and two bressumers.
Wallcroft Farmhouse; 53.68431°N 2.60235°W	—	Late 17th century	The former farmhouse was later extended. It is in sandstone and has a stone-slate roof. The original part has three bays and two storeys with an attic. An extension in front of the first bay has two storeys and one bay, and there are lean-to extensions at the rear. Some mullioned windows remain, but most have been altered. Inside is an inglenook and a bressumer.
Brown House Farmhouse; 53.69865°N 2.59693°W	—	1697	The former farmhouse was extended in the 18th century. It is in sandstone with a stone-slate roof. The house has two storeys, and two bays with a rear wing. On the front is a doorway with a moulded surround, and the windows are mullioned, with some of the mullions missing.
Wheelton House, cottages and coach house 53.67712°N 2.58645°W	—	Mid 18th century	The buildings are in sandstone with stone-slate roofs. The former farmhouse has two storeys, an almost symmetrical two-bay front, and mullioned windows. At the rear is a single-storey extension. Attached to the north are two cottages, also with two storeys and two bays. Beyond them is the coach house, which has an elliptical arched entrance.
Barn, Wheelton House; 53.67713°N 2.58680°W	—	1739 (or 1759)	The barn, with integral shippon, is in sandstone with a stone-slate roof. It has five bays, and contains wagon entrances, doorways, one with an inscribed lintels, windows, a loading door, and ventilation slits.
Miry Fold Cottages; 53.68328°N 2.59471°W	—	Late 18th century	Originally a pair of weavers' cottages, they are in sandstone with a stone-slate roof. They have two storeys, and each cottage has a two-bay front. Both cottages have a doorway, and two windows in each floor. They windows vary; one is mullioned, others have been altered and are fixed, or contain sashes or casements.
12–14 Albert Street; 53.68562°N 2.60201°W	—	Late 18th or early 19th century	A row of three weavers' cottages in sandstone with slate roofs. They have two storeys with basements that probably contained loomshops. No. 14 has two bays, and the others have a single-bay front. The fenestration is varied.
Whin's Bridge; 53.69166°N 2.60505°W		c. 1815	This is bridge No. 83, an accommodation bridge, crossing the Leeds and Liverpool Canal. It is in sandstone and consists of a single elliptical arch with rusticated voussoirs and simple keystones. The bridge has parapets with rounded coping, pilastered ends, and an almost flat deck.
Engine Bridge; 53.69410°N 2.60433°W		c. 1815	This is bridge No. 84, an accommodation bridge, crossing the Leeds and Liverpool Canal. It is in sandstone and consists of a single elliptical arch with rusticated voussoirs and simple keystones. The bridge has parapets with rounded coping, pilastered ends, and an almost flat deck.
Brown House Bridge; 53.69878°N 2.59795°W		c. 1815	This is bridge No. 86, an accommodation bridge, crossing the Leeds and Liverpool Canal. It is in sandstone and consists of a single distorted elliptical arch with rusticated voussoirs. The bridge has parapets with rounded coping, pilastered ends, and a sloping deck.
