= Mawdesley Hall =

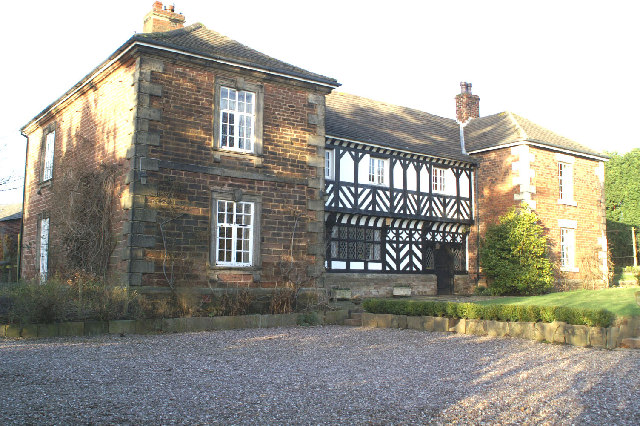
- Mawdesley Hall from the south

- Location in the Borough of Chorley
- 53.6301°N 2.7610°W
- OS grid reference: SD 498 151

History
- Built: 17th century
- Built for: William Mawdesley

Listed Building – Grade I
- Official name: Mawdesley Hall
- Designated: 2 October 1952
- Reference no.: 1164720

Listed Building – Grade II
- Official name: Entrance steps to Mawdesley Hall
- Designated: 2 October 1952
- Reference no.: 1164764

Listed Building – Grade II
- Official name: Cattle-house c.15 metres 22.10.52 north west of Mawdesley Hall
- Designated: 2 October 1952
- Reference no.: 1072503

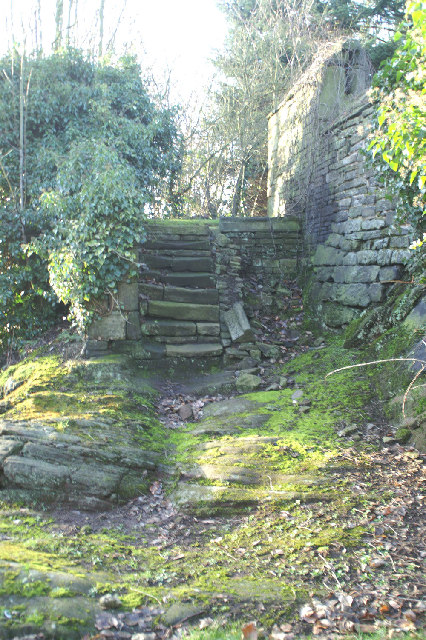
Entrance steps to the garden of the hall

Mawdesley Hall is a country manor in Hall Lane, Mawdesley, Chorley, Lancashire, England. It consists of a central hall with two cross-wings. The central hall was built in the 17th century, its lower storey being timber-framed and its upper floor plastered and painted to resemble timber-framing. The cross-wings were added in the late 18th or early 19th century. The west wing is in sandstone, and the east wing is in brick with stone dressings. The hall is recorded in the National Heritage List for England as a designated Grade I listed building.

Associated with the hall are two Grade II listed buildings. Leading up to the garden of the hall is a flight of stone steps that are dated 1653. To the northwest of the hall is a timber-framed former cattle house that was built in the late 16th or early 17th century.

== Location ==
Mawdesley Hall stands at the north end of the village of Mawdesley in an elevated position about 10 feet (3.0 m) or 12 feet (3.7 m) above the road. It is built on an outcrop of sandstone about 60 feet (18 m) from the road.

== History ==
The original part of the hall was built in the 17th century and was the home of the Mawdesley family. Inside the hall the dates 1625 and 1655 are inscribed. Towards the end of the 18th or the beginning of the 19th century wings were added to each end of the original hall. Later a lean-to building was added to the rear of the hall.

== Architecture ==
The building is in two storeys, and has an H-shaped plan, consisting of a two-bay central hall, with two two-bay cross-wings. The roof is covered in stone-coloured tiles, and is hipped over the fronts of the wings. Each part of the house is built in different materials. The central hall measures about 30 feet (9.1 m) across. Its lower storey is timber-framed with plaster panels on a stone plinth. The upper floor is jettied and is plastered, and is painted to give the appearance of timber-framing. Towards the right end of the lower storey is a doorway and to the left of this is a long mullioned and transomed window. In the upper floor are three casement windows that were inserted later. The left (west) wing projects forward by 8 feet (2.4 m), it is in red sandstone with yellow stone dressings, and has chamfered quoins. The windows have architraves with keystones, and sills on corbels. The right (east) wing projects forward by 9 feet (2.7 m), it is in brick with stone quoins, and contains square-headed windows.

== Appreciation ==
Mawdesley Hall was designated as a Grade I listed building on 22 October 1952. Grade I is the highest of the three grades of listing, and is applied to buildings that are "of exceptional interest, sometimes considered to be internationally important".

== Associated structures ==
=== Entrance steps ===
Leading up from the road to the garden of the hall is a flight of eight sandstone steps that are dated 1653. They are protected on the outside by a sloping parapet with roll-moulded coping. The steps incorporate an enclosed viewing platform on an open-topped turret with loopholes on its sides. They were designed as a Grade II listed building on 22 October 1952. Grade II is the lowest of the grades of listing, and is applied to buildings that are "nationally important and of special interest".

=== Former cattle house ===
To the northwest of the hall is a former cattle house, which was later used as a store. It dates from the 16th or early 17th century, and is timber-framed on a high sandstone plinth, with a roof of stone-coloured tiles. It has four bays, with an outshut at the rear of the third bay. The panels are plastered and painted white. On each side there are four doorways. The cattle house was also designated as a Grade II listed building on 22 October 1952.

== See also ==
- Grade I listed buildings in Lancashire
- Listed buildings in Mawdesley
