= Listed buildings in Mawdesley =

Mawdesley is a civil parish in the Borough of Chorley, Lancashire, England. It contains 18 buildings that are recorded in the National Heritage List for England as designated listed buildings. Of these, one is listed at Grade I, the highest of the three grades, one is at Grade II*, the middle grade, and the others are at Grade II, the lowest grade. The major building in the parish is Mawdesley Hall; this and two associated structure are listed. The parish contains the village of Mawdesley, but is otherwise mainly rural. Most of the listed buildings are, or originated as, farmhouses or farm buildings. The other listed buildings include other houses, cottages, a bridge, and two churches.

== Key ==
Grade	Criteria
I	Buildings of exceptional interest, sometimes considered to be internationally important
II*	Particularly important buildings of more than special interest
II	Buildings of national importance and special interest

== Buildings ==
Name and location	Photograph	Date	Notes	Grade
Cattle house, Mawdesley Hall; 53.63016°N 2.76147°W	—	16th or early 17th century	The cattle house, later used for other purposes, is timber-framed on a sandstone plinth, and has a roof of stone-coloured tiles. It has four bays and an outshut at the rear. Some of the panels are in painted plaster, elsewhere there is brick infill. There are four doorways.	II
Blackburn House; 53.63362°N 2.74110°W	—	Early 17th century	The former farmhouse was expanded in the 19th century. The original part is in sandstone and the later part in brick, and it has a slate roof. The house has a L-shaped plan, and is in two storeys. The original part has two bays, and the extension is to the north. The windows were originally mullioned and/or transomed, but have been altered.	II
Mawdesley Hall; 53.63005°N 2.76102°W		Early 17th century (probable)	A country house with an H-shaped plan. The central part of hall is timber-framed. The cross-wings were added in the late 18th or early 19th century; the west wing is in sandstone, and the east wing is in brick with stone dressings. The whole house is in two storeys, and has a roof of stone-coloured tiles.	I
Black Bull Hotel; 53.63012°N 2.75961°W		17th century	Originally a farmhouse, later used as a public house, it is in sandstone with a tiled roof. The building has two storeys and a three-bay front, with a modern lean-to porch. Above the porch is an inserted window, with mullioned windows to the left, and later casement windows to the right. Inside the building is an inglenook.	II
City Cottage; 53.62994°N 2.75869°W	—	17th century	A timber-framed cottage on a high stone plinth with a stone-slate roof. It has 1 1/2 storeys and two bays, with a modern extension on the left. There are two fixed windows on the front, and an inserted window in a dormer in the right bay. The interior is completely timber-framed.	II
Lane Ends House; 53.62786°N 2.77603°W	—	17th century	The oldest part of the house is the left wing, with the main block built in the 18th century, and there is a modern extension at the rear. The house is in brick on a stone plinth with a stone-slate roof, and it has 2 1/2 storeys. The 18th-century block has a symmetrical two-bay front with a central doorway and two multi-paned windows incorporating sliding sashes on each floor. The attic has inserted windows in hipped dormers. In the first floor of the wing is a former Roman Catholic chapel.	II*
Entrance steps, Mawdesley Hall; 53.62980°N 2.76097°W		1653	A flight of eight sandstone steps leading from the street to the garden of the hall. It has a parapet and incorporates a viewing platform.	II
Barrett's House Farmhouse; 53.62257°N 2.75110°W	—	1695	The farmhouse has two storeys and an almost H-shaped plan. The main range has two bays with a wing projecting forward from the second bay. These parts are in brick on a stone plinth with stone quoins. At the left is a cross-wing in sandstone. The roofs are mainly in stone-slate and partly felted. Most of the windows are sliding sashes, and in the gable of the right bay is a datestone.	II
Farm buildings, Barrett's House Farm; 53.62255°N 2.75069°W	—	c. 1700	The farm buildings are in brick with stone-slate roofs, and consist of two ranges at right angles. The southern range contains a barn, and has openings including a wagon entrance, a round pitching hole, and ventilation holes. The other bay contains stables and a granary, and has a door flanked by windows, round pitching holes, and external steps leading to a loft door.	II
White Barn Door Farmhouse; 53.62795°N 2.78341°W	—	1706	A brick farmhouse on a stone plinth with stone quoins and a tiled roof. It has two storeys, a two-bay front, and a brick lean-to at the left end. In the first bay is a two-storey gabled porch with a datestone and a sliding sash window. In the right bay are two casement windows on each floor.	II
Syd Brook Lane Farmhouse; 53.64492°N 2.75321°W	—	1709	The farmhouse is mainly in brick with some sandstone on a sandstone plinth, partly rendered, and with a slate roof. It has two storeys, and is in a T-shaped plan, consisting of a three-bay range with a rear wing, and there is a short outshut on the south front. On the right gable end is an external staircase leading to a loft door, above which is a datestone. Inside is a large bressumer.	II
Blue Stone Farmhouse; 53.63092°N 2.75201°W	—	Early 18th century	The former farmhouse is in brick with a stone-coloured tile roof. It has two storeys and a symmetrical two-bay front, with a central gabled single-storey porch. There are two three-light sliding sash windows in each floor, and at the rear is a small-paned stairlight.	II
White Bridge; 53.63472°N 2.80632°W		Early to mid 18th century (probable)	The bridge carries Station Road (B5246) over the new cut of the River Douglas. It is in sandstone and has three spans, each with rusticated voussoirs and a keystone. At the bases of the piers are rounded cutwaters.	II
The Willows; 53.62799°N 2.77652°W	—	1770	A brick house on a stone plinth with stone quoins and a stone-slate roof. It has two storeys and an L-shaped plan, with a front of three bays, and a wing receding from the third bay. The windows are sashes, and above the doorway is a datestone.	II
Anderton Mill Cottage; 53.62268°N 2.74149°W	—	1799	Originally a miller's cottage containing earlier material, later used as a house, it is in sandstone with a slate roof. The house has two storeys and an L-shaped plan, with a main range of three bays, and a rear wing. On the front is a gabled porch with a red tiled roof and an oval panel with the date. The windows vary; some are fixed, some are sliding sashes, and others are casements.	II
The Grove; 53.62757°N 2.77779°W	—	Early 19th century	A brick house on a stone base with a slate roof, it has two storeys, a symmetrical three-bay front, and a service wing at the rear. The central bay projects slightly forward and is gabled; it contains a Tuscan doorcase. The windows are sashes.	II
St Peter and St Paul's Church and presbytery 53.62613°N 2.74535°W		1830–31	A Roman Catholic church and presbytery in sandstone with a slate roof and red ridge tiles. They form a T-shaped plan, with a three-bay church and a four-bay presbytery at the south. At the north end of the church is a single-story Gothic porch, and a bellcote on the gable. The windows have diamond lattice glazing. The presbytery has two storeys, a door with a moulded surround and a fanlight. The windows are sashes.	II
St Peter's Church; 53.62355°N 2.77334°W		1839–40	The church was designed by Edmund Sharpe in Gothic Revival style, the chancel was added in 1878–89, and the church was restored in 1892 by Richard Knill Freeman. It is in sandstone with a slate roof, and consists of a nave, a chancel, and a west steeple partly embraced by the nave. The steeple has a tower with buttresses, it contains a west door, and has a stepped parapet with crocketed pinnacles. On top of the tower is an octagonal spire. Inside the church is a west gallery.	II
