= 2010 Chorley Borough Council election =

2010 UK local government election

Elections to Chorley Borough Council were held on 6 May 2010. One third of the council was up for election and the Conservative party held overall control.

After the election, the composition of the council was:

Party	Seats
Conservative	27
Labour	15
Independent	2
Liberal Democrat	3

== Election result ==
Chorley local election result 2010
Party	Seats	Gains	Losses	Net gain/loss	Seats %	Votes %	Votes	+/−
Conservative	10	0	0	Steady	56	39	17,926	−6.7
Labour	5	0	0	Steady	31	39	18,158	+3.9
Liberal Democrats	1	0	0	Steady	6	12	5,605	+4.2
Independent	1	0	0	Steady	6	8	3,801	−2.4
UKIP	0	0	0	Steady	0	1	412	+1
Green	0	0	0	Steady	0	0.5	222	+0.5

== Results Map ==
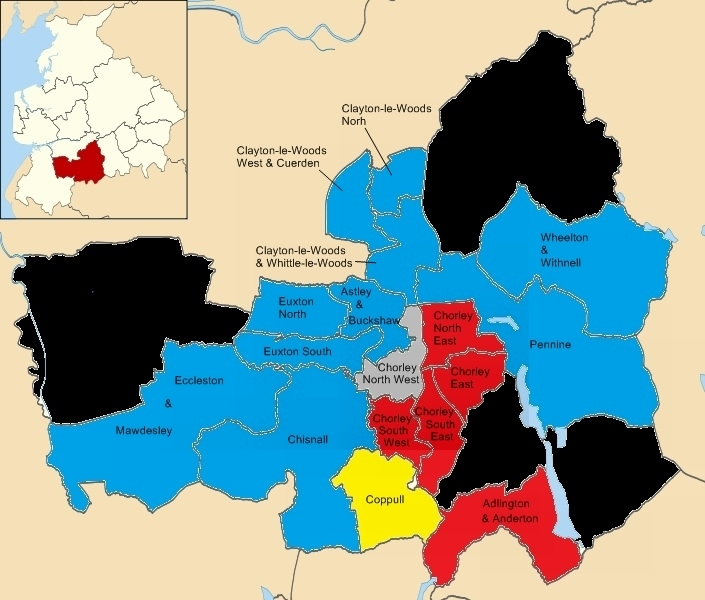
2010 results

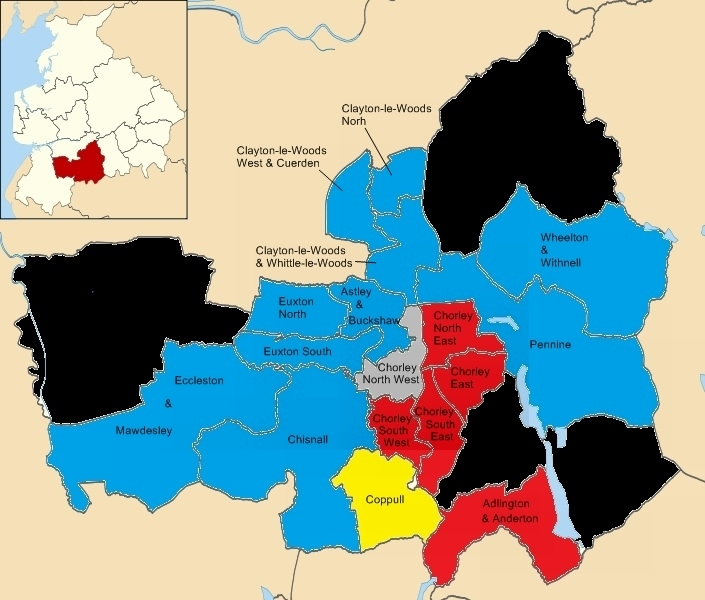
Previous 2006 results

== Ward results ==
=== Adlington and Anderton ward ===
Adlington and Anderton
Party	Candidate	Votes	%	±%
Labour Co-op	Catherine Hoyle	2,231	55.6	+13
Conservative	Barbara Higham	1,186	29.6	−14
Liberal Democrats	Philip William Pilling	593	14.8	+1
Majority		1,045	27	+26
Turnout		4,010	73	
Labour hold		Swing	+13.5	

=== Astley and Buckshaw ward ===
Astley and Buckshaw
Party	Candidate	Votes	%	±%
Conservative	Alan Platt	1,170	53.9	−23.0
Labour	Ian Handley	1,002	46.1	+23
Majority		66	3	−45
Turnout		2,172	72	
Conservative hold		Swing	-23	

=== Chisnall ward ===
Chisnall
Party	Candidate	Votes	%	±%
Conservative	Harold Heaton	1,190	51.0	−7
Labour	Edward Foreshaw	620	26.6	−15
Liberal Democrats	Don Hoyland	349	15.0	+15
Independent	Alan Samuel Cornwell	174	7.5	+7
Majority		570	24	+8
Turnout		2333	72.11	
Conservative hold		Swing	+4	

=== Chorley East ward ===
Chorley East
Party	Candidate	Votes	%	±%
Labour	Hasina Khan	1,743	58	−4
Conservative	Khalid Sohail	657	22	−16
Independent	Mel Coombes	607	20	+20
Majority		1086	36	+11
Turnout		3007	63	
Labour hold		Swing	+6	

=== Chorley North East ward ===
Chorley North East
Party	Candidate	Votes	%	±%
Labour	Dennis Edgerley	1,523	48	+3
Conservative	Bulvinder Michael	894	28	−11
Liberal Democrats	Linda Eubank	456	14	+14
UKIP	Nick Hogan	234	7	+7
Green	Ian Bridge	84	3	+3
Majority		629	20	+13
Turnout		3191	66.55	
Labour hold		Swing	+7	

=== Chorley North West ward ===
Chorley North West
Party	Candidate	Votes	%	±%
Independent	Ralph Snape	3,020	83.0	+7
Conservative	Brett Austin Trevalyan	441	12.1	+1
UKIP	Colin Denby	178	4.9	4.9
Majority		2,579	70.9	+7
Turnout		3,639	76.95	
Independent hold		Swing	+3	

=== Chorley South East ward ===
Chorley South East
Party	Candidate	Votes	%	±%
Labour	Beverley Murray	1,441	45.4	−1
Conservative	Elliot J. Matthews	1,097	34.6	−8
Liberal Democrats	David Porter	497	15.7	+5
Green	Chris Ffelan	138	4.3	+4
Majority		344	10.8	+8
Turnout		3,173	66.16	
Labour hold		Swing	+3.5	

=== Chorley South West ward ===
Chorley South West
Party	Candidate	Votes	%	±%
Labour	Roy Lees	1,616	47	−5
Conservative	Samuel Andrew Chapman	1,124	33	−15
Liberal Democrats	Colin Grunstein	711	20	+20
Majority		492	14	+10
Turnout		3451	59.8	
Labour hold		Swing	+5	

=== Clayton le Woods and Whittle le Woods ward ===
Clayton le Woods and Whittle le Woods
Party	Candidate	Votes	%	±%
Conservative	Eric Bell	2,300	55	−11
Labour Co-op	Frances Maguire	1,024	24	+5
Liberal Democrats	Glenda Charlesworth	882	21	+5
Majority		1276	30	−17
Turnout		4206	60.1	
Conservative hold		Swing	-8	

=== Clayton le Woods North ward ===
Clayton le Woods North
Party	Candidate	Votes	%	±%
Conservative	Margaret Cullens	1,178	38	−15
Labour	Steve Murfitt	1,037	34	+4
Liberal Democrats	Stephen John Fenn	853	28	+11
Majority		141	5	−19
Turnout		3068	72.75	
Conservative hold		Swing	-9.5	

=== Clayton le Woods West and Cuerden ward ===
Clayton le Woods West and Cuerden
Party	Candidate	Votes	%	±%
Conservative	Michael Muncaster	1,274	55	−2
Labour Co-op	Dave Rogerson	1,060	45	+1
Majority		214	9	−4
Turnout		2334	70	
Conservative hold		Swing	-1.5	

=== Coppull ward ===
Coppull
Party	Candidate	Votes	%	±%
Liberal Democrats	Ken Ball	1,613	50	−1
Labour	Richard Toon	1,087	33	−1
Conservative	Stephen William Royce	546	17	+2
Majority		526	16	−2
Turnout		3246	67.16	
Liberal Democrats hold		Swing	0	

=== Eccleston and Mawdesley ward ===
Eccleston and Mawdesley
Party	Candidate	Votes	%	±%
Conservative	Keith Iddon	2,015	57.6	0
Labour Co-op	Helen Margaret Bradley	1,484	42.4	0
Majority		531	15	0
Turnout		3,499	72.96	
Conservative hold		Swing	0	

=== Euxton North ward ===
Euxton North
Party	Candidate	Votes	%	±%
Conservative	Rosemary Russell	1,388	53.3	−2
Labour Co-op	Mark Andrew Jarnell	1,215	46.7	+2
Majority		173	7	−3
Turnout		2603	74.13	
Conservative hold		Swing	-2	

=== Euxton South ward ===
Euxton South
Party	Candidate	Votes	%	±%
Conservative	Geoffrey Russell	1,379	60.1	−1
Labour	Anthony Stephen Holgate	915	39.9	+1
Majority		464	20	−2
Turnout		2294	71.38	
Conservative hold		Swing	-1	

=== Pennine ward ===
Pennine
Party	Candidate	Votes	%	±%
Conservative	Marie Elizabeth Gray	820	62.3	−3
Labour	Hollie Louise Berry	496	37.7	+18
Majority		324	25	−20
Turnout		1,316	77.8	
Conservative hold		Swing	-10.5	

=== Wheelton and Withnell ward ===
Wheelton and Withnell
Party	Candidate	Votes	%	±%
Conservative	Alison Hansford	1,282	52.8	−2
Labour	Neil James Caton	1,148	47.2	+2
Majority		134	5.5	
Turnout		2,430	75.76	
Conservative hold		Swing	-2	
