= Brindle, Lancashire =

Village in Lancashire, England

Coordinates: 53.712°N 2.613°W

Brindle
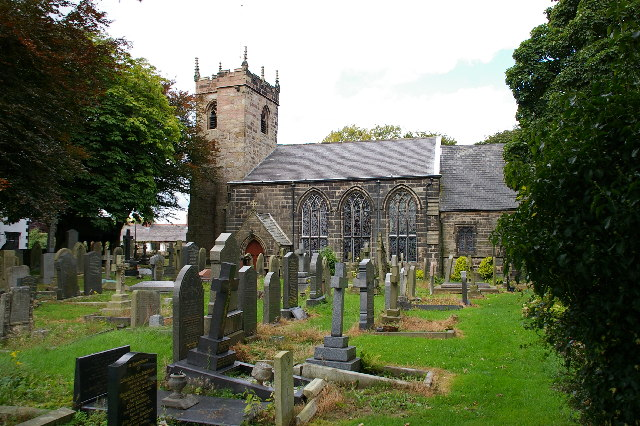
- St James' Church, Brindle

- Shown within Chorley Borough Location within Lancashire
- Population: 978 (2011 Census)
- OS grid reference: SD596241
- Civil parish: Brindle
- District: Chorley
- Shire county: Lancashire
- Region: North West
- Country: England
- Sovereign state: United Kingdom
- Post town: CHORLEY
- Postcode district: PR6
- Dialling code: 01254 / 01772
- Police: Lancashire
- Fire: Lancashire
- Ambulance: North West
- UK Parliament: Chorley

Brindle is a small village and civil parish of the borough of Chorley, Lancashire, England. The population of the civil parish at the 2011 census was 978. It is in the centre of a triangle between Preston, Blackburn, and Chorley. The area has little industry. Brindle is one of the more affluent areas in Lancashire, with average earnings over 33% higher than the national average. Occupations include professionals, teachers, and an increasingly retired population as well as some remaining agricultural employment.

Brindle is home to the Anglican St James' Church and a number of trails and bridle paths. As a parish offering excellent links to nearby towns including business centres such as Preston, Bolton, Chorley and Manchester.

== See also ==
- Listed buildings in Brindle, Lancashire
