= Wheelton =

Village in Lancashire, England

Coordinates: 53.685°N 2.601°W

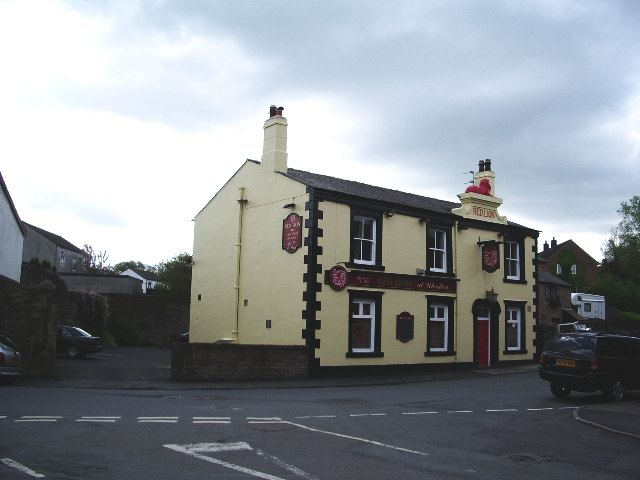
- The Red Lion public house

- Shown within Chorley Borough Location within Lancashire
- Population: 956 (2011 census)
- OS grid reference: SD603211
- Civil parish: Wheelton
- District: Chorley
- Shire county: Lancashire
- Region: North West
- Country: England
- Sovereign state: United Kingdom
- Post town: CHORLEY
- Postcode district: PR6
- Dialling code: 01254
- Police: Lancashire
- Fire: Lancashire
- Ambulance: North West
- UK Parliament: Chorley

Wheelton is a village and civil parish of the Borough of Chorley, in Lancashire, England. According to the 2001 United Kingdom census it has a population of 1,001, reducing to 956 at the 2011 Census. The village is located on the A674 Chorley–Blackburn road.

There are two communities: Wheelton, which is close to the Leeds-Liverpool Canal and borders Whittle-le-Woods; and Higher Wheelton which is located on the road from Chorley to Blackburn. It is one of the more affluent parts of Lancashire owing to easy motorway access and a semi rural setting.

Wheelton Clock Tower is set in a garden at the centre of the village commemorating the men of Heapey and Wheelton who fell in the Great War in 1914–1918. The Grade II Listed memorial is made from local stone and was unveiled in 1922.

== See also ==
- Listed buildings in Wheelton
- Listed buildings in Heapey
