= Mawdesley =

Village in Lancashire, England

Coordinates: 53.624°N 2.770°W

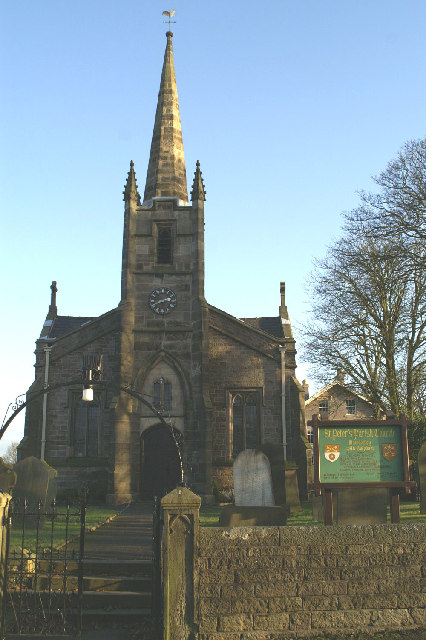
- St. Peter's Church

- Shown within Chorley Borough Location within Lancashire
- Population: 1,702 (2011)
- OS grid reference: SD491145
- Civil parish: Mawdesley
- District: Chorley
- Shire county: Lancashire
- Region: North West
- Country: England
- Sovereign state: United Kingdom
- Post town: ORMSKIRK
- Postcode district: L40
- Dialling code: 01704
- Police: Lancashire
- Fire: Lancashire
- Ambulance: North West
- UK Parliament: South Ribble

Mawdesley is a village and civil parish in Lancashire, England, which had a population of 1,702 as per the 2011 Census.

== History ==
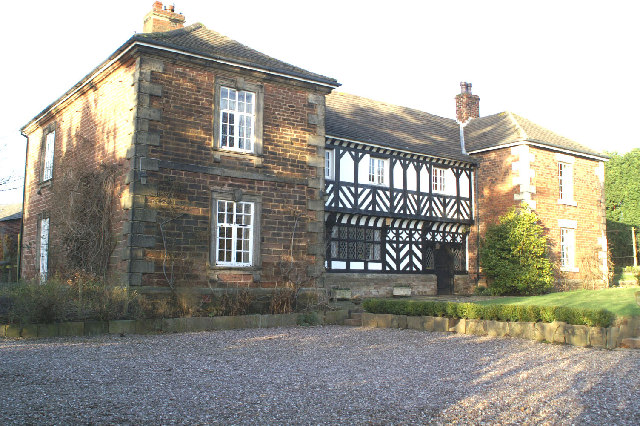
Mawdesley Hall

The name Mawdesley is thought to have originated in the reign of Edward I (1272–1308). The suffix -ley describes a field, meadow or clearing. Records show that a manor existed in 1250 AD on the site of the present Mawdesley Hall.

Mawdesley supported willow farming and basket-making in the 19th century, with the growing conditions notable for producing strong and durable rods. The United Nations Food and Agriculture Organization lists the 'Mawdesley' willow variety as being named for the village.

Mawdesley Hall is a small hall on a back road leading into the village. It was built by William Mawdesley in 1625, but altered towards the end of the 18th century.

== Transport ==
The village has limited public transport services. The nearest railway station is three miles away at Rufford.

Bus Services include: 337 Chorley to Ormskirk via Charnock Richard, Eccleston, Croston, Mawdesley, Parbold and Burscough

347 Chorley to Southport via Charnock Richard, Eccleston, Croston, Mawdesley, Rufford, Holmeswood, Banks and Crossens.

== Religion ==
In common with the rest of Lancashire, Mawdesley was home to a number of Catholic recusants in the 16th and 17th centuries. Nearly a quarter of adult men in the village were listed as recusants in the Protestation Returns of 1641, and in 1717 a large number of Catholic yeomen had registered estates in the village.

St Peter and St Paul's Catholic Church, at OS grid reference SD508146, Salt Pit Lane, was founded in 1830. The Wesleyan Methodist church on New Street was built in 1844 from religious societies founded by John Wesley and his preachers and was at OS grid reference SD493150. St Peter's CE Church, High Street, Mawdesley with Bispham, was founded in 1840 and is at OS grid reference SD489143.

== Education ==
The village has two small primary schools, Mawdesley St Peter's C of E School, and St Peter and Paul's Catholic School. Little Acorns pre-school operates from within Mawdesley St Peter's C of E School and serves Mawdesley and the surrounding villages, providing play-based learning for three to five-year olds.

== Geography ==
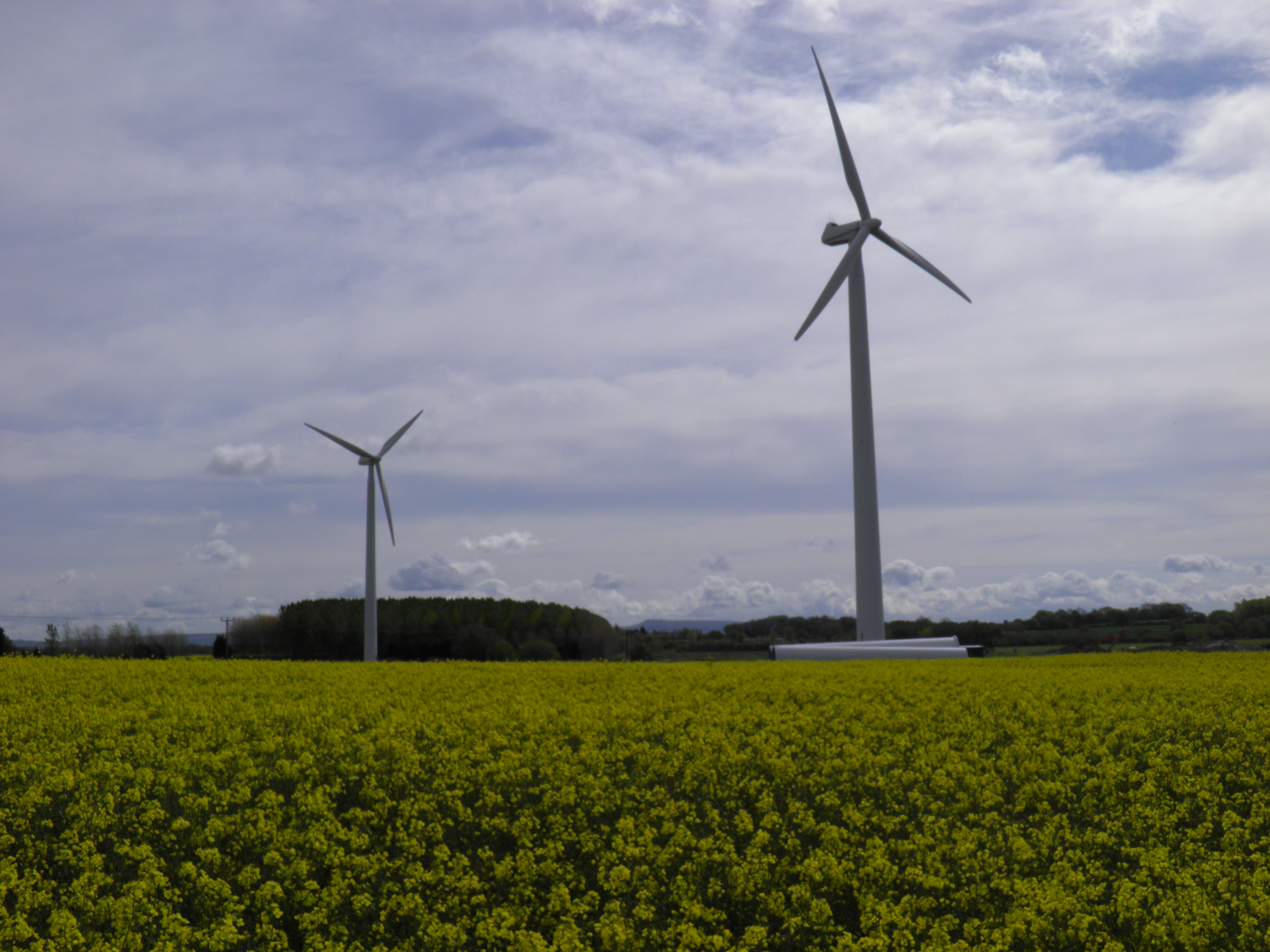
Mawdesley Moss Wind Farm

The village sits on a low rise from the surrounding Mawdesley Moss, a flat, intensively-farmed plain. The moss forms the eastern edge of the West Lancashire Coastal Plain with the neighbouring Croston Moss and contains a three-turbine 2,250kW wind farm.

The River Douglas runs along the western boundary of the moss, flowing north to meet the River Ribble at Hesketh Bank. The Syd, Reed and Bentley brooks and a number of sluices run through the village into the Douglas, and the moss contains a pumping station. The Rufford branch of the Leeds and Liverpool Canal runs alongside the river in this area, having superseded the Douglas Navigation as a trading route in the 18th century.

The nearest hill, Harrock Hill (515 ft) belongs to the neighbouring parishes of Hilldale and Wrightington. This low, rolling hill is visible in some areas of Mawdesley and, with the wind farm, serves as a landmark from the surrounding flat landscape.

== Sport ==
Mawdesley Cricket Club is based in the village. Historically playing in the Palace Shield competition, the club will play in the Northern Premier Cricket League in 2024, the top tier of club cricket in England and Wales.

== Notable residents ==
- Former England and Wales and Lancashire cricketer Jack Iddon was born in Mawdesley in 1902.
- Father James Mawdsley

== See also ==
- Listed buildings in Mawdesley

== Sources ==
- A History of the County of Lancaster: Volume 6 William Farrer & J. Brownbill (editors)
