= Euxton railway station (disambiguation) =

Euxton railway station is a station in Lancashire, England it will be one of:

- Euxton railway station (London and North Western Railway) opened by the North Union Railway in 1838 and closed in 1895 and replaced by Balshaw Lane and Euxton railway station.
- Euxton railway station, Lancashire & Yorkshire Railway opened by the Bolton and Preston Railway in 1843 and closed in 1917.
- Euxton Junction railway station the same station as above, often called Junction particularly on Ordnance Survey maps.
- Balshaw Lane and Euxton railway station, opened in 1895 to replace Euxton railway station (London and North Western Railway), it was situated 3/4 mile (1.2 km) south of the original Euxton station, closed in 1969
- Euxton Balshaw Lane railway station was built on the same site as Balshaw Lane and Euxton railway station, opening in 1997.

Other stations in Euxton, Chorley

- ROF Chorley Halt was located at a Royal Ordnance Factory site. The Halt did not appear in public timetables, it opened in 1938 and closed in 1964.
- Buckshaw Parkway railway station opened on almost the same site as ROF Chorley Halt in 2011.

== See also ==
- Euston railway station in London, England
