= Andrew Gray (zoologist) =

British zoologist, teacher and conservationist

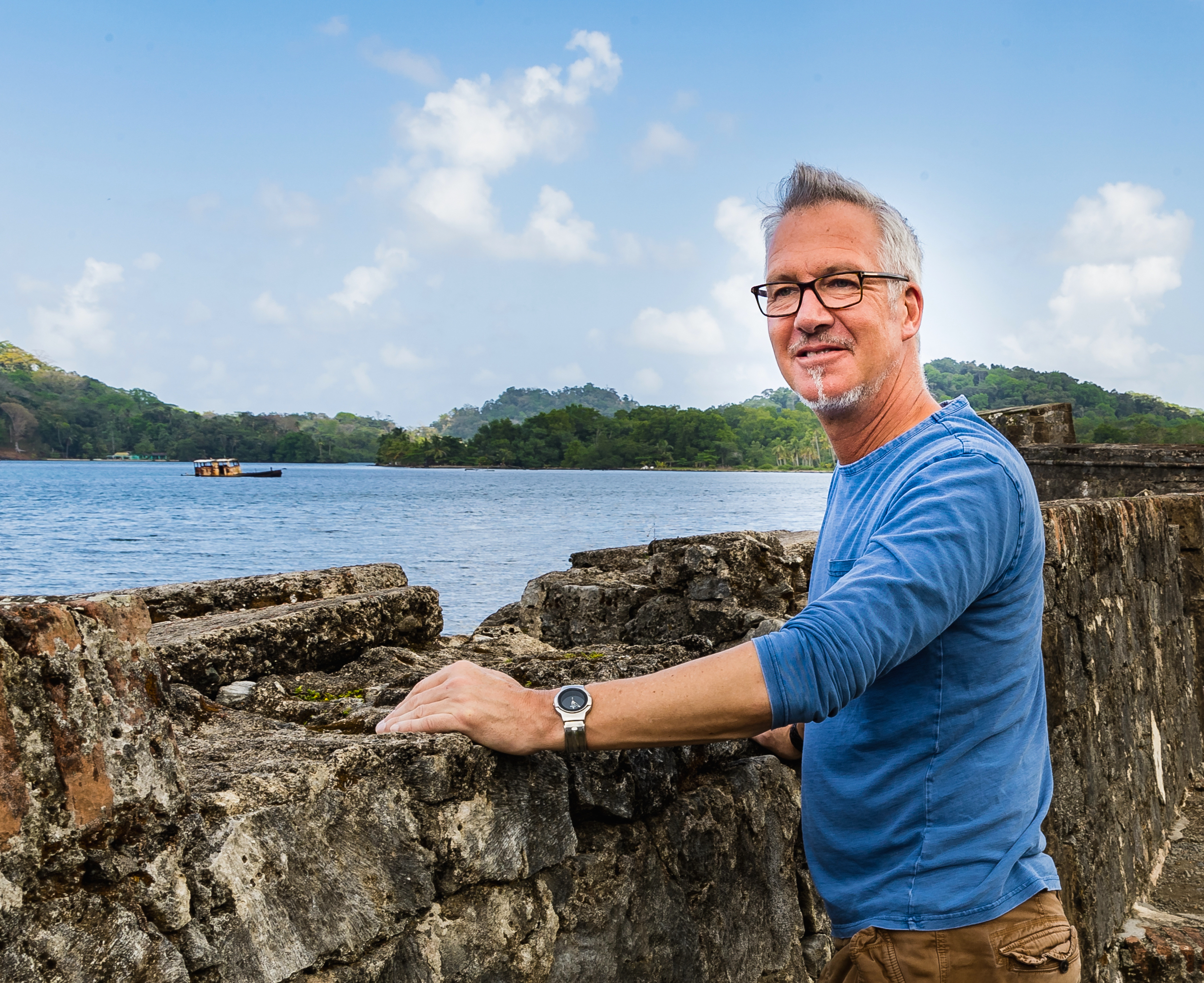
Andrew Gray, Panama, 2018

Andrew Gray is a British zoologist, teacher and conservationist.

== Biography ==
Andrew Gray is an Honorary Senior Lecturer at The University of Manchester. He was appointed Curator of Herpetology at Manchester Museum in September 1995. Here he established ‘The Vivarium’, a free to the public purpose-built facility dedicated to the conservation of tropical amphibians. Gray's interest in amphibians and reptiles began from a very early age. During his career as a professional herpetologist he has discovered new species and established conservation initiatives to save some of the world's rarest frogs, for example the critically endangered lemur leaf frog. Gray is an authority on frogs of the Phyllomedusinae genus Cruziohyla. He described the tadpole of Cruziohyla calcarifer and in 2018 described the new species Cruziohyla sylviae which is named after his first grandchild Sylvia Beatrice Gray.

Gray's conservation efforts have mainly focused in Central America, where he has initiated multi-disciplined collaborative projects, developed international environmental education programmes, and jointly established student field courses for the University of Manchester. In 2006 Gray was a main scientific adviser for the BBC's landmark series Planet Earth and worked further with Sir David Attenborough on the BBC Natural World's programme Fabulous Frogs. Apart from wildlife conservation, Gray also has a keen interest in conserving English heritage and in 2004 completely restored the then derelict Euxton Hall Chapel, which was designed by E. W. Pugin in 1866.
