= Preston–Liverpool line =

Overview
- Status: Operational
- Termini: Preston railway station; Liverpool Lime Street railway station

Service
- Operator(s): Northern Trains

The Preston to Liverpool is a railway route in the United Kingdom. From Preston railway station, the route is approximately 57 minutes long when on time. Using the route via Newton-le-Willows will take 1 hour and 9 minutes.

== Services ==
The route has a daily hourly service in each direction with 2 trains per hour in the peaks.

The route is used to the whole route by Northern under the brand of Northern Electrics. Northern uses Class 319s. They will run the Liverpool Lime Street to Blackpool North railway station on the completion of the electrification of the Preston to Blackpool line in 2017.

== Stations ==
Stations on route:

- Preston railway station
- Leyland railway station
- Euxton Balshaw Lane railway station
- †Wigan North Western railway station
- †St Helens Central railway station
- †Huyton railway station
- †Liverpool Lime Street railway station

† – Northern Electrics operate two lines between Wigan and Liverpool; however, this is the express route which continues to Preston while the other route terminates at Wigan. See Liverpool–Wigan line.

== See also ==
- West Coast Main Line
