= Euxton Balshaw Lane railway station =

Railway station in Lancashire, England

Euxton Balshaw Lane
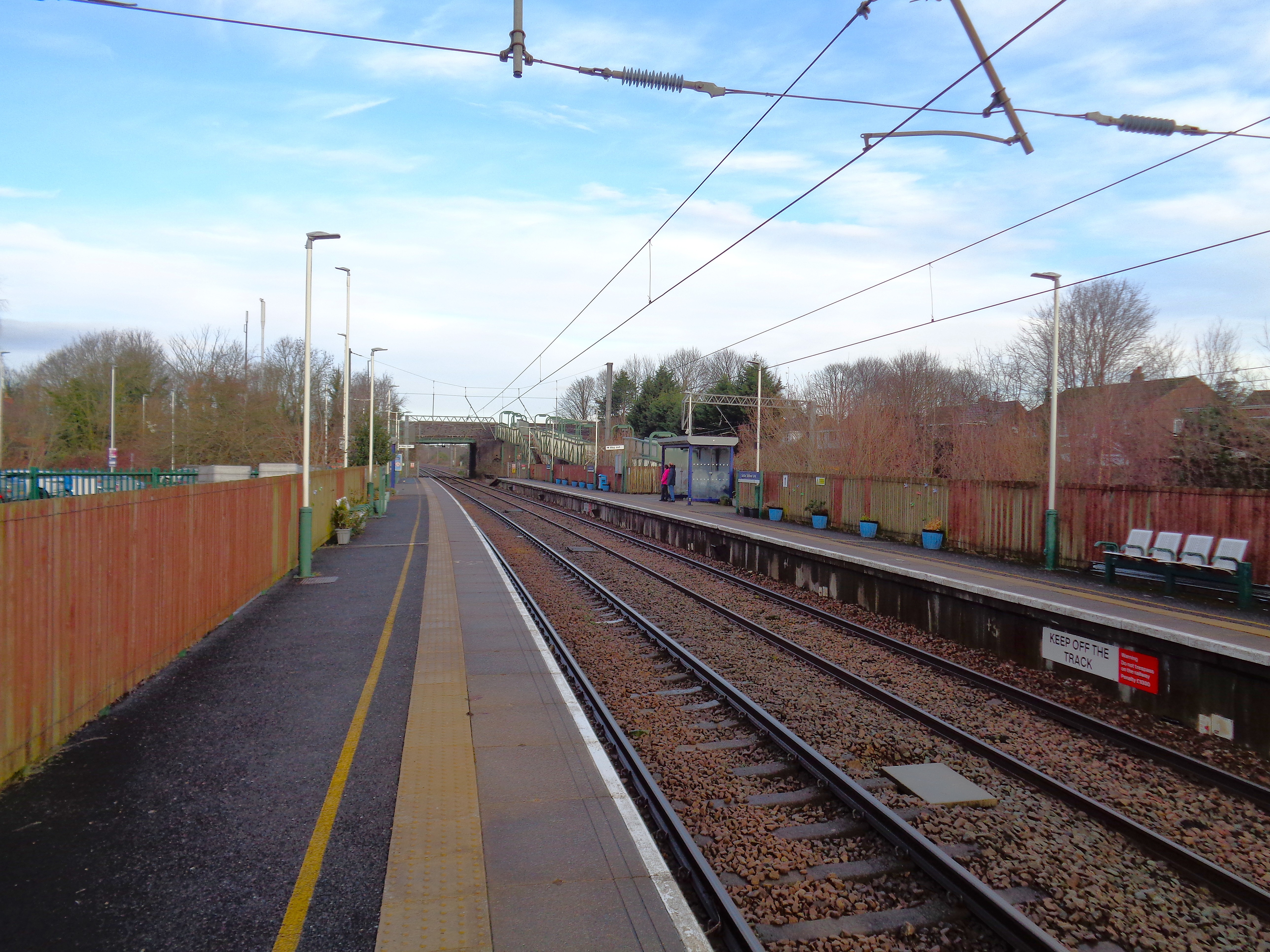

General information
- Location: Euxton, Chorley; England
- Coordinates: 53.6607°N 2.6718°W
- Grid reference: SD557184
- Manager: Northern Trains
- Platforms: 2
- Tracks: 4

Other information
- Station code: EBA
- Classification: DfT category F2

History
- Original company: London and North Western Railway
- Pre-grouping: London and North Western Railway
- Post-grouping: London, Midland and Scottish Railway

Key dates
- 2 September 1905: Opened as Balshaw Lane and Euxton
- 6 October 1969: Closed
- 15 December 1997: Reopened as Euxton Balshaw Lane

Passengers
- 2020/21: ▼12,752
- 2021/22: ▲55,858
- 2022/23: ▼54,084
- 2023/24: ▲66,130
- 2024/25: ▲75,928
Location
- Location within the Borough of Chorley Location within Lancashire
Notes
- Passenger statistics from the Office of Rail and Road

Euxton Balshaw Lane is one of two railway stations situated in Euxton /ˈɛkstən/, Lancashire, England. It is a local station on the Blackpool North to Liverpool Lime Street route, on the stretch between Wigan and Preston.

== History ==
The railway line between Wigan and Preston was opened by the North Union Railway (NUR) on 31 October 1838, and among the original stations was one at Euxton, close to the Bay Horse public house on the south side of Euxton Lane. The NUR was split up in 1889, part of it (including Euxton station) becoming wholly owned by the London and North Western Railway (LNWR). Euxton station closed on 2 September 1895 at the behest of the Anderton Family.

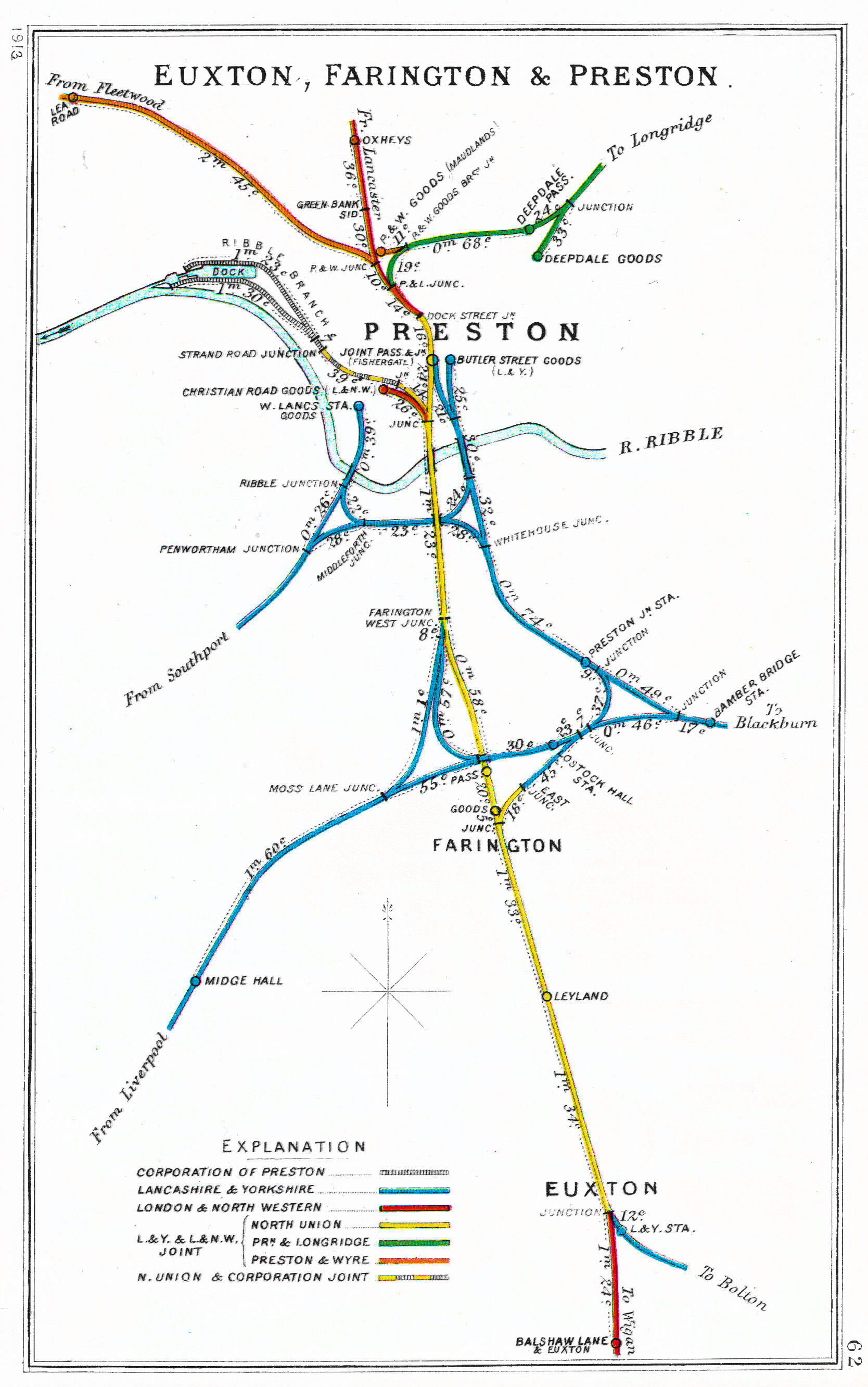
A 1913 Railway Clearing House Junction Diagram showing railways around Preston, including Balshaw Lane & Euxton station (bottom right)

A new station named Balshaw Lane and Euxton, between Coppull and Leyland and about 3/4 mile (1.2 km) south of the original Euxton station, was opened by the LNWR on the same day, 2 September 1895.

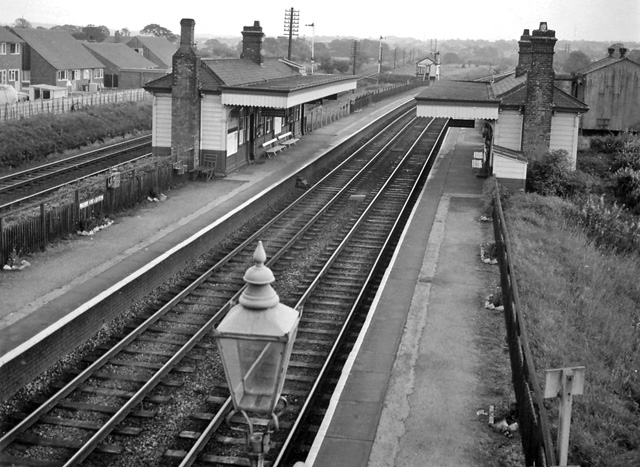
Balshaw Lane & Euxton Station in 1964

Balshaw Lane & Euxton station was closed by British Rail on 6 October 1969 as part of the Beeching review of the UK railway network.

Euxton also had a station at the Royal Ordnance Factory site, ROF Chorley, on the Preston to Manchester line which opened on 24 January 1938, the station was named 'ROF Halt' and closed on 31 August 1964.

As well as this another station on the Lancashire and Yorkshire Railway Company's Bolton and Preston Railway was built named Euxton Junction which was near to the Pack Saddle Bridge. Access to this station was via a footbridge from next to today's gastro pub, "The Railway at Euxton". However, this station closed in 1895.

Services from the former Balshaw Lane and Euxton station restarted on 15 December 1997, initially on an "experimental" basis for a period of five years. It was officially reopened in 1998, (the opening ceremony being performed by former Radio 1 DJ and, latterly, Radio Lancashire presenter and transport enthusiast, Andy Peebles), and was now named Euxton Balshaw Lane.

The use of "Balshaw Lane" in the station's name was added, at the time of opening, at Lancashire County Council's behest (the main station's sponsor and funder) in view of the possibility, at some future stage, of the opening of a station on the site of the Royal Ordnance Factory at Euxton and to distinguish itself (and avoid a subsequent name change) from that station. It was expected that the station at the ROF site might be named either "Euxton" or "Euxton ROF". In fact, when Euxton's other railway station eventually opened in October 2011, on the Manchester-Preston route, it was called Buckshaw Parkway.

== Facilities ==
The station has two platforms on the slower north–south lines of the West Coast Main Line and is served by Northern Trains with trains to Blackpool North and Liverpool. Euxton Balshaw Lane does not have any full-time staff, PA system or ticket office, nor, unlike Horwich Parkway railway station, a station built around the same period, any clocks or display screens. A payable car park is also available.

== Services ==
The station has a daily hourly service in each direction with 2 trains per hour in the weekday peaks. Services run from Liverpool Lime Street to Preston and Blackpool North. Through weekday services to Blackpool North were restored in May 2018 following the completion of electrification work.

Preceding station	National Rail	Following station
Leyland	Northern Trains; Blackpool North to Liverpool Lime Street	Wigan North Western
	Historical railways	
Leyland; Line and station open	London and North Western Railway; North Union Railway	Coppull; Line open, station closed
