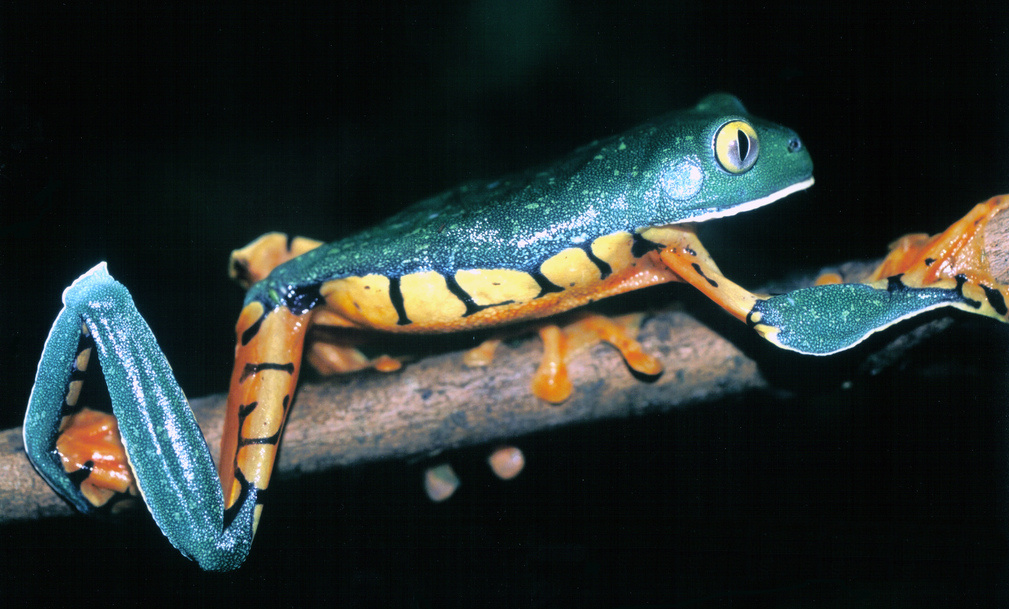

Conservation status
- Least Concern (IUCN 3.1)

Scientific classification
- Kingdom: Animalia
- Phylum: Chordata
- Class: Amphibia
- Order: Anura
- Family: Phyllomedusidae
- Genus: Cruziohyla
- Species: C. sylviae

Binomial name
- Cruziohyla sylviae Gray, 2018

= Cruziohyla sylviae =

Sylvia's tree frog

Species of amphibian

Cruziohyla sylviae, also known as Sylvia's tree frog, is a large colourful species of tree frog from Central America. People have seen it between 30 and 1600 meters above sea level.

== Description and taxonomy ==
The species was described in 2018 by zoologist Andrew Gray, and is named after his granddaughter. It can be distinguished from the closely related C. calcarifer (Splendid Tree Frog) by having small green lichen-like markings on its dorsal surfaces rather than white or pale blue spots and lacking characteristic dark ventral markings found on the under-thighs of C. calcarifer which are characteristic of only that species of Cruziohyla. The species is also easily identified by having a large external eardrum (tympanum), which is almost the same size as the eye, compared to an eardrum half its size, as seen in C. calcarifer. DNA analysis places C. sylviae genetically closer to its sister species, C. craspedopus, than to the true C. calcarifer described by George A. Boulenger in 1902. The adult male frog measures 44.3 to 67.0 mm in snout-vent length and the adult female frog 73.5 to 88.2 mm.

== Distribution ==
C. sylviae occurs from Panama to Honduras, where it lives in primary forest. The type locality for the species is Guayacán in Limón province of Costa Rica. Until 2018 the species was confused with the splendid tree frog (C. calcarifer), which occurs from Ecuador to Costa Rica.
