= Euxton railway station (London and North Western Railway) =

Disused railway station in Lancashire, England

Euxton

General information
- Location: Euxton, Chorley, Lancashire; England
- Coordinates: 53.6678°N 2.6736°W
- Platforms: 2

Other information
- Status: Disused

History
- Original company: North Union Railway
- Pre-grouping: London and North Western Railway

Key dates
- 31 October 1838: Opened
- 2 September 1895: Closed
Location
- Location within the Borough of Chorley Location within Lancashire

Euxton was an early railway station serving Euxton in Chorley, Lancashire, England.

The station was opened on 31 October 1838 when the North Union Railway opened its line from Wigan to Preston.

The station was located to the north of Euxton where Know Lane crossed the railway, between Know House and the Bay Tree Inn. The station comprised a single platform with a station house to the east side of the railway. By 1894 there were two buildings on the east side of the line, platforms on both sides of the railway with some smaller structures on the north-bound platform. There did not appear to be any goods facilities.

The station closed on 2 September 1895. The London and North Western Railway (LNWR) replaced Euxton with a new station, Balshaw Lane and Euxton, opening on the same day located 3/4 mile (1.2 km) south of the original Euxton station. The NUR was absorbed by two larger companies in 1889, the section from Parkside to Euxton became part of the L&NWR.

The line remains open between Preston and Wigan, however nothing remains of the station.

| Preceding station | Historical railways | Following station |
|---|---|---|
| Coppull | North Union Railway | Leyland |

== Bibliography ==
- Grant, Donald J. (31 October 2017). Directory of the Railway Companies of Great Britain. Troubador Publishing Ltd. ISBN 978-1-78803-768-6.
- Oliver, Henry; Airey, John (1894). Hand-book and Appendix of Stations, Junctions, Sidings, Collieries, &c., on the Railways in United Kingdom.
- Quick, Michael (2022) [2001]. Railway passenger stations in Great Britain: a chronology (PDF). version 5.04. Railway & Canal Historical Society. Archived from the original (PDF) on 25 November 2022.
