= Buckshaw Hall =

Manor house in Lancashire, England

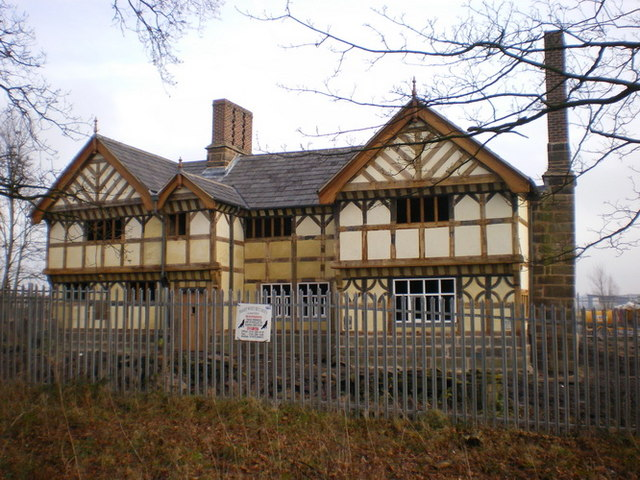

- Location within the Borough of Chorley
- Former names: Higher Buckshaw

General information
- Location: Buckshaw Village, Euxton, Chorley, England
- Coordinates: 53.6757°N 2.6630°W
- Opened: 1654
- Owner: John Greenhalgh

Technical details
- Material: Timber framing on a sandstone base
- Floor area: 3,100 sq ft (290 m^{2})

Other information
- Number of rooms: 5 bedrooms, 4 reception rooms

Listed Building – Grade II*
- Official name: Buckshaw Hall
- Designated: 11 July 1975
- Reference no.: 1362139

Buckshaw Hall is a Grade II* listed 17th-century country house in Buckshaw Village, Euxton, some 3 miles (4.8 km) north-west of Chorley, England.

== History ==
The Buckshaw Estate was originally owned by the Anderton family of Euxton Hall, who in 1652 sold it to Major Edward Robinson Melmoth, who built the present hall in 1654. In the 19th century, the estate was sold to John Walmsley and then passed to the Towneley Parkers of Cuerden Hall and the Crosse family of Shaw Hill. Extensive restoration of the southern wing was carried out by Colonel Thomas Richard Crosse in 1885, after which it was sold to Richard Stock, who in 1936 sold the estate and surrounding farmland to the Ministry of Supply to establish a new munitions factory. The munitions complex was known as ROF Chorley and the hall was used for office accommodation. In 2005 the factory was closed and the site transferred back to private ownership. Much of the land is being developed for housing as Buckshaw Village.

In 1954 the Ministry of Works planned to demolish the building but this was not done. By 2002 Buckshaw Hall was dilapidated and Chorley Civic Society campaigned for developers to restore it. It was vandalised in 2012.

Having been sold in 2018, the hall is now privately owned. Restorative work including reconstruction of the collapsed east elevation was carried out by Donald Insall Associates.

== Architecture ==
It is a timber-framed manor house on a high sandstone plinth with infilling partly in wattle and daub and partly in brick, and with a slate roof. It has a H-shaped plan, consisting of a hall with two cross-wings, and is in two storeys. Behind the hall is a projecting stair turret. The upper floors of the wings are jettied, and the gables have wavy bargeboards and apex finials. Inside are inglenooks, bressumers, and timber-framed partitions.

== See also ==
- Grade II* listed buildings in Lancashire
- Listed buildings in Euxton
