= Splendid tree frog =

Splendid tree frog can refer to:

- Magnificent tree frog
- Cruziohyla calcarifer
