= Euxton Hall Chapel =

- Location within the Borough of Chorley
- 53.6612°N 2.6750°W
- OS grid reference: SD 55450 18444
- Location: Euxton, Lancashire
- Country: England
- Denomination: Roman Catholic
- Website: www.euxtonhallchapel.com

History
- Status: Family chapel
- Founded: 15 August 1866

Architecture
- Functional status: Private dwelling
- Architect: E. W. Pugin
- Architectural type: Chapel
- Style: Gothic
- Closed: 24 July 1982

Specifications
- Materials: Red sandstone with yellow stone dressings

Listed Building – Grade II
- Official name: Chapel circa 50 metres south east of Euxton Hall
- Designated: 17 April 1967
- Reference no.: 1072465

Euxton Hall Chapel is situated in the village of Euxton, Lancashire, England. It was designed by architect E. W. Pugin (1834–1875), and built in 1866 as a private chapel for the Anderton family. Set within the grounds of Euxton Hall, and a Grade II listed building within its own right, the small Gothic chapel has been described as an architectural gem. Both English Heritage and the Ancient Monuments Society acknowledge that it is one of the important works of this architect. The Victorian Society has also recognised the building's national importance.

Stained glass window in Euxton Hall Chapel by Hardman & Co.

Of particular interest is the large stained glass window manufactured by Hardman & Co., set in the west wall and dated 14 October 1866. It incorporates the coat of arms of the Anderton family, which is repeated in the encaustic floor tiles of the centre aisle. Herbert Minton, the first manufacturer to produce these tiles in 1830, worked closely with Pugin in their design and manufacture for numerous buildings, notably the Palace of Westminster.

In 1866, the architectural period of the Gothic Revival was at its peak, and Euxton Hall Chapel, having been designed by Pugin, was arguably one of the finest Victorian chapels to be found in England. The exterior of the chapel is almost entirely Pugin. The South front has three pairs of lancet window, a typical medieval feature, with each arch having a pair of intricate detailed carvings. The shaped slate tiles on the roof of the Chapel form geometric patterning, a feature also associated with the work of Pugin. In 2004 the chapel was restored by conservationist Andrew Gray and converted by him to a private residence.

== See also ==
- Listed buildings in Euxton

== Notes ==
- Hodkinson, Kenneth (1994). Euxton-Burgh: A Pictorial Record of Bygone Days. ISBN 978-0-9512936-3-8.
- Mawdesley, J. (2001). A Brief History of St Mary's R.C. Church, Euxton, and the Anderton family.
- The Victoria County History of Lancashire (Volume 6, page 140)
- "Atticus" (Anthony Hewitson) (1872). Our Country Churches and Chapels. Preston: A. Hewitson.
