= Listed buildings in Euxton =

Euxton is a civil parish in the Borough of Chorley, Lancashire, England. The parish contains 28 buildings that are recorded in the National Heritage List for England as designated listed buildings. Of these, two are listed at Grade II*, the middle grade, and the others are at Grade II, the lowest grade. The parish contains the village of Euxton, and is surrounded by agricultural land. Many of the listed buildings are, or originated as, farmhouses and farm buildings. The other listed buildings include churches and associated structures, large houses, some with associated structures, and a pair of former weavers' cottages,

== Key ==
Grade	Criteria
II*	Particularly important buildings of more than special interest
II	Buildings of national importance and special interest

== Buildings ==
Name and location	Photograph	Date	Notes	Grade
Euxton Parish Church; 53.66508°N 2.67433°W		14th century	The church was built as a chapel of ease, then was used as a private chapel, before becoming the parish church. The chancel was added in 1837–38. The church is in sandstone with a stone-slate roof, and has a simple plan consisting of a nave and a chancel. Extending from the west gable is a bellcote. Inside the church, on the south wall are a coupled sedile and piscina, and in the north wall is an aumbry.	II*
Barn, Euxton House Farm; 53.65772°N 2.66343°W	—	Early 16th century (probable)	The original part of the barn is cruck-framed and encased in brick with a roof of corrugated sheet. It was extended to the south in the 18th century in brick with stone dressings and a slate roof. The original part has five bays with three full cruck trusses. The newer part has stone quoins, doorways and two round pitch holes.	II
Armetriding Farmhouse; 53.65646°N 2.69353°W	—	1570	A sandstone farmhouse, partly rendered, with a stone-slate roof, that was later extended. It has two storeys and a T-shaped plan, consisting of a range with a cross-wing, both with two bays. The older part is the cross-wing, which has mullioned windows. Attached to this wing is a lean-to containing a door, and elsewhere is a datestone. The openings in the other range date from the 18th and 19th centuries.	II
Buckshaw Hall; 53.67574°N 2.66299°W		Early 17th century (or earlier)	A timber-framed manor house on a high sandstone plinth with infilling partly in wattle and daub and partly in brick, and with a slate roof. It has a H-shaped plan, consisting of a hall with two cross-wings, and is in two storeys. Behind the hall is a projecting stair turret. The upper floors of the wings are jettied, and the gables have wavy bargeboards and apex finials. Inside are inglenooks, bressumers, and timber-framed partitions.	II*
Balshaw House; 53.66101°N 2.67006°W		c. 1660	A farmhouse (also known as Balshaw House Farm) built by Richard Balshaw (Constable of Euxton) c. 1660, later a house, altered in the 18th century. It is in sandstone with a rendered front, and has a slate roof. The house has an L-shaped plan, the wing behind the first bay being the earliest part, and containing mullioned windows. On the front the third bay projects slightly forward and is gabled. Inside the house is timber-framing.	II
Riverside Cottage; 53.65616°N 2.68021°W	—	Early 17th century (probable)	Originally a fulling mill adjacent to the River Yarrow, and later converted into a cottage, it is in sandstone with a stone-slate roof and brick chimneys. There are two storeys and three-bays. On each side are three windows in each floor, with two doors on the east side and one on the west.	II
Shaw Green House Farmhouse; 53.66263°N 2.71484°W	—	Early 17th century	The farmhouse was altered later in the 17th and in the 18th century, and has been divided into two dwellings. It is in painted brick on a stone base and has a red tiled roof. The building has three storeys and three bays, with a two-storey single-bay extension at the rear. Inside is a blocked inglenook, a bressumer and timber-framed partitions.	II
Broxop's Farmhouse; 53.66663°N 2.66243°W	—	Early to mid-17th century (probable)	A brick farmhouse on a high stone plinth with some stone quoins, and a roof that is partly felted, partly slated and partly tiled. It has two storeys and three bays, with a two-storey gabled porch. The windows are altered. Inside are an inglenook, a bressumer, and some timber-framing.	II
Barn, Euxton Hall; 53.66123°N 2.67558°W	—	17th century	The barn is in sandstone and has a sheeted roof. It has a rectangular eight-bay plan, with a smaller wing added at the northwest. The barn contains opposing wagon entrances, ventilation slits, windows, a round-headed doorway, a square pitching hole, and two circular openings.	II
Peacock House Farmhouse; 53.65989°N 2.69808°W	—	Late 17th century	The former farmhouse is in sandstone with a stone-slate roof. It has two storeys and three bays, with a two-storey porch on the front. This has a round-headed entrance with voussoirs, it contains stone benches, and above it has a modern casement window. the other windows being mullioned. On the left side are external steps leading to a first-floor doorway. Inside is an inglenook, a bressumer, and timber-framed partitions.	II
Bourne's Farmhouse; 53.67072°N 2.70438°W	—	1688	A farmhouse, mainly in brick, with some stone, on a stone plinth with a slate roof. It has two storeys and an L-shaped plan, with a front of three bays, the gabled first bay receding as a cross-wing. In the angle at the rear is an outshut, and above the door is a datestone.	II
Old Shaw Green Farmhouse; 53.65972°N 2.70540°W	—	1703	The former farmhouse was altered in the 1930s. It is built in brick on a high sandstone plinth with a stone-slate roof, and has 2 1/2 storeys. The original part had three bays with a cross-wing, and there have been later additions of an outshut and a single-storey extension to the left. Inside are back-to-back inglenook fireplaces with bressumers.	II
Shaw Green Farmhouse; 53.66317°N 2.71450°W	—	1705	A brick farmhouse on a stone plinth with a roof partly of slate and partly of stone-slate. It has 2 1/2 storeys, and an irregular T-shaped plan with a single-bay front and a two-bay cross-wing on the left. Inside is a large inglenook and a bressumer.	II
Barn, Stanfield House; 53.67122°N 2.65909°W	—	Early 18th century (probable)	The brick barn stands on a stone plinth and has a stone-slate roof. It has a rectangular plan with five bays, an extension in front of the fourth bay, and a shippon at the rear. The barn contains a wagon door, and ventilation slits at four levels.	II
Sundial; 53.66499°N 2.67428°W	—	Early 18th century (possible)	The sundial is in the churchyard of Euxton Parish Church. It is in stone and consists of a column on a pedestal standing on two circular steps. On the top is a moulded cap with a plain gnomon.	II
Euxton Hall; 53.66080°N 2.67633°W		1739	Originally a country house, rebuilt in 1849–50, partly demolished in 1929 after a fire, and later used as a hospital. It is in Georgian style, and built in stone with a slate mansard roof. There is a single storey, and it is in a symmetrical plan of seven by six bays. In the centre of the entrance front is a pedimented doorcase with pairs of unfluted Ionic semicolumns. Above the door is a round-headed fanlight, and on the roof is a cupola. The windows are sashes.	II
Barn, Copland Farm; 53.66091°N 2.70298°W	—	1742	The barn is cruck-framed with brick cladding and a felted roof. It contains three cruck trusses.	II
Altcar Farmhouse, barn and screen wall 53.67944°N 2.70332°W		18th century	The farmhouse and barn are in brick with slate roofs. The farmhouse has two storeys and two bays, and the barn has ventilation slits in a diamond pattern on two levels. The north gables of both have blind Gothic arches, and crow-stepped parapets with crocketed finials. Between them is an embattled sandstone screen wall also with a crocketed parapet, and with a Gothic doorway.	II
1 and 2 Primrose Cottages; 53.66007°N 2.70096°W	—	Late 18th century (probable)	A pair of weavers' cottages (part of a row of four) in rendered sandstone with slate roofs. They have two storeys and each cottage has a doorway with a three-light loomshop window to the right, and square windows to the left and on the upper floor. There are also loomshop windows at the rear.	II
Houghton House Farmhouse; 53.66967°N 2.66783°W	—	Late 18th century (probable)	A sandstone farmhouse with a slate roof. It has two storeys and a symmetrical three-bay front, in the centre of which is a doorcase with pilasters and a raised cornice. The windows are casements surrounded by large jamb stones.	II
Pack Saddle Farmhouse; 53.67864°N 2.67916°W	—	Late 18th century	A sandstone farmhouse with a slate roof in two storeys, and with a symmetrical front of two bays. The central doorway has a round-headed doorcase with a keystone and a fanlight. There are two sash windows in each floor and, at the rear, is a six-light mullioned loomshop window and another sash window.	II
Gate piers, Euxton Hall; 53.66010°N 2.67460°W	—	19th century (probable)	The two pairs of gate piers stand at the entrance to the drive. They are square, in stone, and have dentilled pedimented caps. On top of the inner piers are urn finials.	II
Gate lodge, Euxton Hall; 53.66428°N 2.67509°W	—	Mid-19th century (probable)	The lodge is rendered, on a stone plinth, with stone dressings and a hipped slate roof. It is in simple Neoclassical style, with a single storey and a symmetrical square plan. On the front is a pedimented gabled porch with panelled pillars. Some windows are round-headed, others are casements with architraves.	II
Gate piers, Euxton Hall lodge 53.66428°N 2.67476°W	—	Mid-19th century (probable)	The stone gate piers are square and have pilastered corners. On the tops are large entablatures with pedestals carrying ball finials encased in squares.	II
St Mary's Church; 53.66659°N 2.67659°W		1864–65	The Roman Catholic church, designed by E. W. Pugin, is in sandstone with slate roofs. It consists of a nave, aisles, two south porches, transepts, and a three-sided apse. Along the sides are paired lancet windows separated by buttresses, and the apse has a triple lancet in each side. At the opposite end are six lancets, above which are two windows with Reticulated tracery, and a niche containing a statue of the Madonna and child.	II
Presbytery, St Mary's Church; 53.66660°N 2.67703°W		1864–65	The presbytery was designed by E. W. Pugin, and the clock tower, added in 1877, is by Pugin and Pugin. The building is in sandstone with a slate roof. It has two storeys and a basement, and on the front are two gabled bays and the clock tower. In the first bay is a two-storey canted bay window, and the second bay contains two tall windows. The clock tower has three stages, with buttresses, a doorway, windows, bell openings, and a broach spire with a clock face in the eaves on the east side.	II
Runshaw Hall; 53.67590°N 2.69702°W	—	1862	A large house, later converted into flats, in red brick with yellow stone dressings and a hipped slate roof. It is in elaborately decorated Italianate style. The house has two storeys and is in a rectangular plan with sides of three and six bays. The doorway in the south front has a moulded entablature with a cornice, and pilasters with capitals prominently carved with foliage. The windows have carved architraves, and on the upper floor is a Venetian window. On the west front are bay windows, one of which is two-storeyed and semicircular. At the northwest corner is a belvedere surmounted by ornamental railings.	II
Chapel, Euxton Hall; 53.66058°N 2.67560°W		1866	Built as a private chapel, it is in red sandstone with yellow stone dressings and a slate roof. The chapel consists of a single rectangular cell in Gothic style with buttresses on the sides. The windows contain Decorated tracery. In the west wall is a diamond-shaped tablet with a Latin inscription.	II
