= Euxton Parish Church =

Coordinates: 53.665055°N 2.674550°W

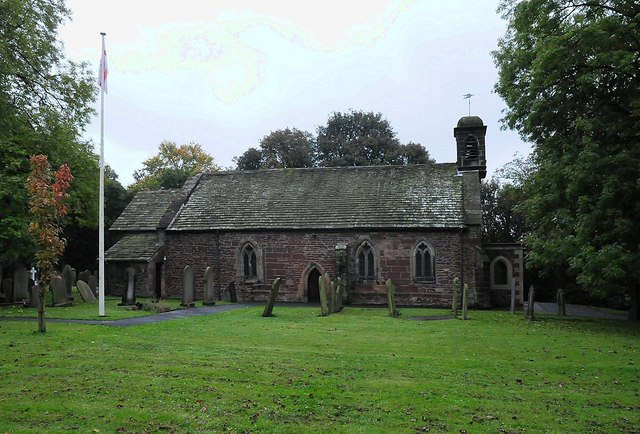

- Location in the Borough of Chorley
- OS grid reference: SD 55543 18944
- Location: Euxton, Chorley, Lancashire
- Country: England
- Denomination: Anglican
- Website: Euxton C of E Church, Euxton

History
- Status: Parish church

Architecture
- Functional status: Active
- Heritage designation: Grade II*
- Architectural type: Church

Specifications
- Capacity: 191
- Materials: Stone, slate roofs

Administration
- Province: York
- Diocese: Blackburn
- Archdeaconry: Blackburn
- Deanery: Chorley
- Parish: Euxton

Clergy
- Vicar: Revd Grant Ashton

Euxton Parish Church is in the English village of Euxton in the borough of Chorley, Lancashire. It is an active parish church in the Diocese of Blackburn and the archdeaconry of Blackburn. It is recorded in the National Heritage List for England as a designated Grade II* listed building. The church has a seating capacity of 191.

== History ==
The church probably dates from the 14th century, rebuilt about 1513 by the Molyneux family. Originally known as Burgh Chapel, the church was a chapel of ease to St Andrew's Church, Leyland and was used as a Roman Catholic chapel until the late 17th or early 18th century, when it was transferred to the Church of England.

The church was originally built as a chapel for Euxton Hall and bears a date stone with the initials of one of the Molyneux family who were the owners of the chapel and Euxton Hall from the 14th century.

== Architecture ==
=== Exterior ===
There is a commonality between the appearance of Euxton Parish Church and the oldest parts of neighbouring 14th-century church in Eccleston.

Having evolved from a small family chapel into a local parish church, the exterior of the church has seen several stages of modifications, the most recent being the addition of a porch, which was built at the front of the church in 1998 using a similar red sandstone taken from the barn of Eli Heaton (who had served as church verger for over 45 years, having been appointed on 13 December 1951).

=== Interior ===
Notably, in the nave there is a double piscina and sedilia which have been dated from around the first 50 years of the 14th century.

== External features ==
The churchyard contains the war grave of an airman of World War II.

== See also ==
- Grade II* listed buildings in Lancashire
- Listed buildings in Euxton
