= Euxton railway station (Lancashire and Yorkshire Railway) =

Disused railway station in Lancashire, England

Euxton

General information
- Location: Euxton, Chorley, Lancashire; England
- Coordinates: 53.6763°N 2.6752°W
- Platforms: 2

Other information
- Status: Disused

History
- Original company: Bolton and Preston Railway
- Pre-grouping: Lancashire and Yorkshire Railway

Key dates
- 22 June 1843: Opened
- 2 April 1917: Closed
Location
- Location within the Borough of Chorley Location within Lancashire

Euxton was an early railway station serving Euxton in Chorley, Lancashire, England.

The station was opened on 22 June 1843 when the Bolton and Preston Railway (B&PR) opened its line from Bolton to Preston.

The station was also known as Euxton Junction, it was located just south of the junction where the B&PR and the North Union Railway (NUR) met, close to Pack Saddle Bridge. The B&PR became part of the NUR in 1844.

The passenger station was accessed from the road where it crossed the railway, just north of the junction and there was one long platform on the east side of the line. There were buildings at the road side and on the platform. The goods side of the station was to the west of the line and accessed from the Wigan to Preston road, adjacent to a public house, which had probably been Cocker's Bridge and became the Railway Tavern.

By 1894 all access appeared to be from the road adjacent to the Railway Tavern, there were platforms both sides of the running lines both with structures. There were sidings on both sides of the mainline forming a goods yard which was able to accommodate most types of goods including live stock and was equipped with a five ton crane.

The NUR was absorbed by two larger companies in 1889, the section from Bolton to Euxton, and therefore this station, became part of the L&YR.

The station closed on 2 April 1917. The line remains open between Preston and Wigan, however nothing remains of the station.

| Preceding station | Historical railways | Following station |
|---|---|---|
| Chorley | Bolton and Preston Railway | Leyland |

== Bibliography ==
- Grant, Donald J. (31 October 2017). Directory of the Railway Companies of Great Britain. Troubador Publishing Ltd. ISBN 978-1-78803-768-6.
- Oliver, Henry; Airey, John (1894). Hand-book and Appendix of Stations, Junctions, Sidings, Collieries, &c., on the Railways in United Kingdom.
- Quick, Michael (2022) [2001]. Railway passenger stations in Great Britain: a chronology (PDF). version 5.04. Railway & Canal Historical Society. Archived from the original (PDF) on 25 November 2022.
