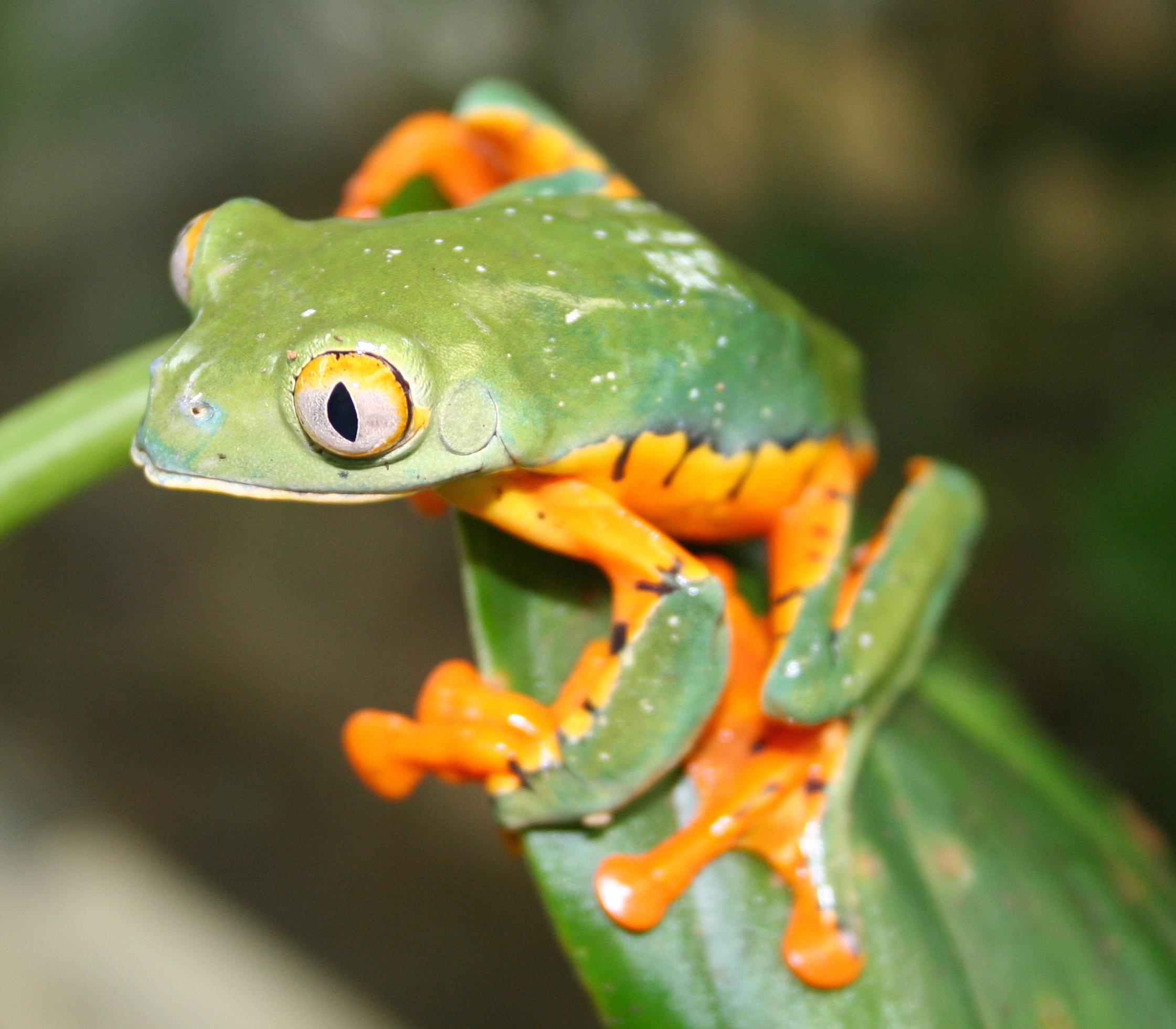

Conservation status
- Least Concern (IUCN 3.1)

Scientific classification
- Kingdom: Animalia
- Phylum: Chordata
- Class: Amphibia
- Order: Anura
- Family: Phyllomedusidae
- Genus: Cruziohyla
- Species: C. calcarifer

Binomial name
- Cruziohyla calcarifer (Boulenger, 1902)

Synonyms
- Agalychnis calcarifer Boulenger, 1902

= Cruziohyla calcarifer =

Splendid leaf frog

Species of amphibian

Cruziohyla calcarifer, the splendid leaf frog or splendid treefrog, is a species of tree frog of the subfamily Phyllomedusinae described in 1902 by George Albert Boulenger. It has a distribution from Esmeraldas Province in northwestern Ecuador, through western Colombia and Panama to the most southerly part of Costa Rica. It is a nocturnal, arboreal frog inhabiting primary humid lowland forest. The tadpole of this species was described in 2021 (https://doi.org/10.33256/31.3.170176)

Found in Central American Rainforests, the splendid tree frog often lives in humid, tropical rainforests and can be found high in the canopy tree layer.

== Appearance ==
Young imagos have bright yellow marks near their mouths and eyes and none on their hind legs.

The adult male frog measures 56.4 to 80.5 mm in snout-vent length and the adult female frog 57.0 to 88.8 mm. The frog's skin is green with some white or light blue spots. The irises are pale gray with yellow rings. The flanks and hind legs are yellow with short black stripes and triangular patterns. The forelegs and much of the front feet are orange. The throat is yellow. Unlike those of most other tree frogs, the belly of C. calcarifer has dark pigmentation.

== Eggs and tadpoles ==
The female frog deposits her clutch on leaves overhanging bodies of water, such as ponds. The tadpoles differ in color and mouth shape from other Cruziohyla tadpoles.

== Threats ==
This frog is not endangered but its population is in decline. Scientists attribute this to deforestation and habitat fragmentation associated with logging, agriculture, livestock grazing, and urbanization. They are also killed by pesticides.

== Genetic studies ==
Cruziohyla calcarifer is the most divergent species in the genus Cruziohyla. DNA analysis places Cruziohyla sylviae closer genetically to its sister species, Cruziohyla craspedopus, than to the true Cruziohyla calcarifer described by George A. Boulenger in 1902.

Cruziohyla Calcarifer secrete a chemical mucus which is said to have properties which can aid humans in fighting off bacterias.
