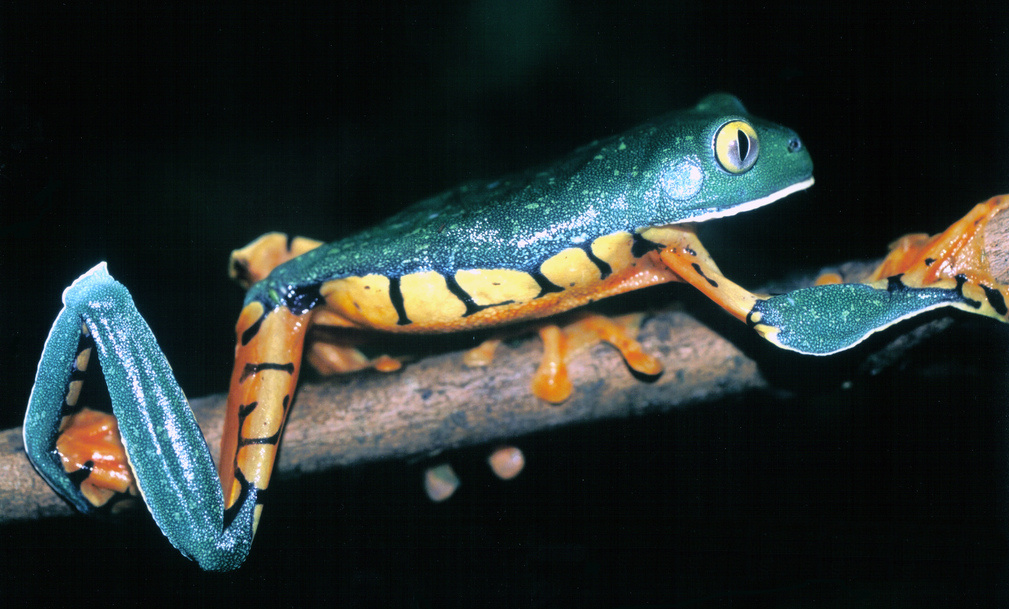
- Cruziohyla sylviae

Scientific classification
- Kingdom: Animalia
- Phylum: Chordata
- Class: Amphibia
- Order: Anura
- Family: Phyllomedusidae
- Genus: Cruziohyla; Faivovich et al., 2005

Diversity
- 3 species (see text)

= Cruziohyla =

Genus of amphibians

Cruziohyla is a genus of frogs in the subfamily Phyllomedusinae. They occur from Honduras in Central America south to the Amazon Basin in South America. This genus was erected in 2005 following a major revision of the Hylidae and fully reviewed in 2018. Species in this genus were previously placed in the genera Agalychnis or Phyllomedusa.

These frogs are characterized by extensive hand and foot webbing. Their eye has a bicoloured iris. Tadpoles develop in water-filled depressions on fallen trees. The name Cruziohyla honors Brazilian herpetologist Carlos Alberto Gonçalves da Cruz.

== Species ==
There are three Cruziohyla species:

- Cruziohyla calcarifer (Boulenger, 1902) – splendid leaf frog
- Cruziohyla craspedopus (Funkhouser, 1957) – fringe tree frog
- Cruziohyla sylviae (Gray, 2018) – Sylvia's tree frog
