= Coppull railway station =

Former railway station in England

Coppull
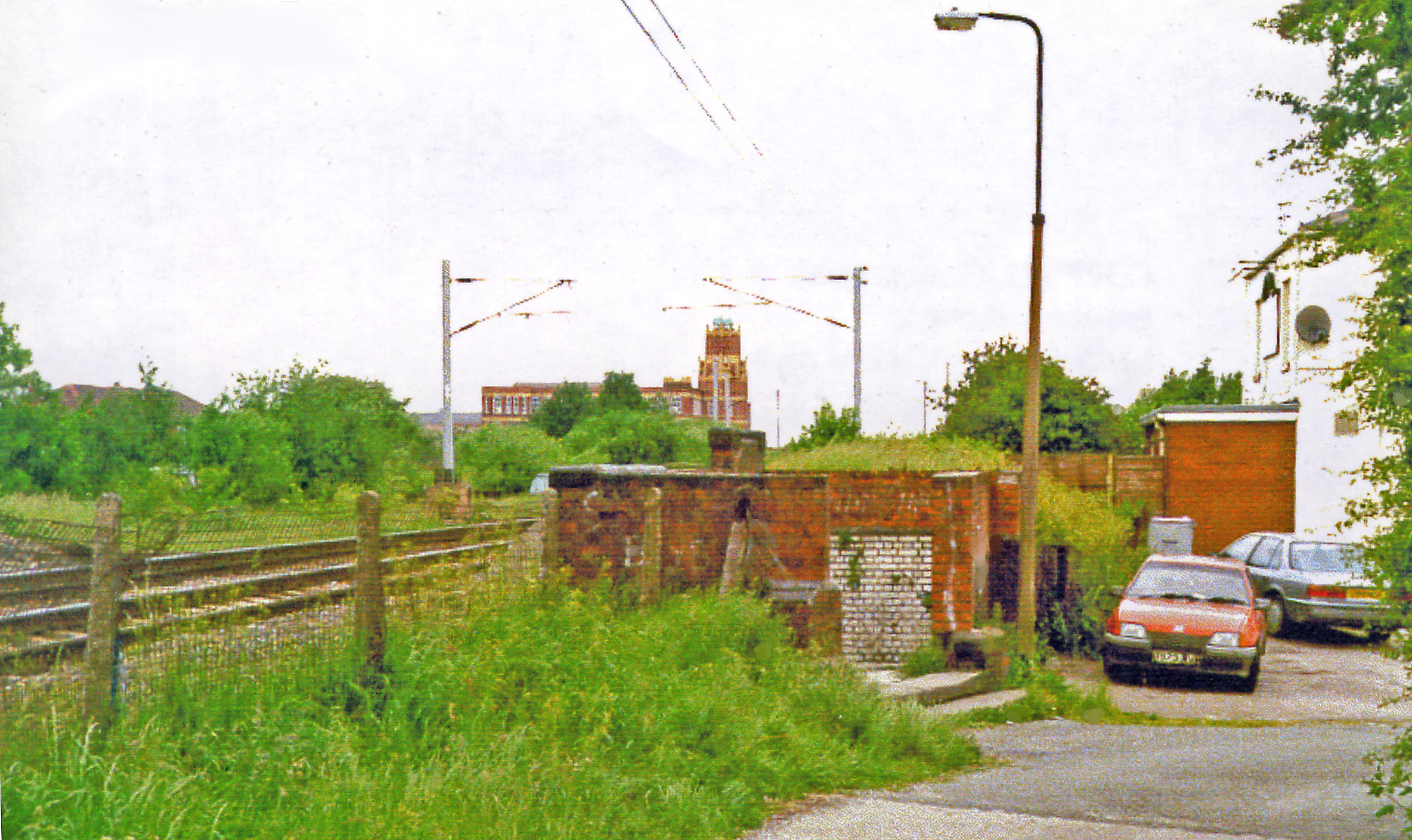
- Site of the station (1994)

General information
- Location: Coppull, Chorley; England
- Coordinates: 53.6236°N 2.6589°W
- Grid reference: SD565144
- Platforms: 2

Other information
- Status: Disused

History
- Pre-grouping: North Union Railway; London and North Western Railway
- Post-grouping: London, Midland and Scottish Railway

Key dates
- 31 October 1838: Station opened
- 2 September 1895: resited 70 yards from original site.
- 6 October 1969: Station closed
Location

Coppull railway station is a closed railway station in Coppull, England, situated on Station Road in the centre of the village.

Coppull was in the historic county of Lancashire and remains in the county's modern version.

== History ==
The station was opened by the North Union Railway in 1838. The North Union later became part of the London and North Western Railway. The station was resited about 70 yards in 1895 The station joined the London Midland and Scottish Railway during the Grouping in 1923 and passed to the London Midland Region of British Railways on nationalisation in 1948.

The station closed in October 1969.

== Services ==
In 1922 eight "Down" (northbound) services called at Coppull on Mondays to Saturdays. Most were local services, with a Saturdays Only "Parliamentary", calling at most stations in a five and a half hour journey from Crewe to Carlisle. No trains called on Sundays. The "Up" service was similar.

== Future ==
In 2019, councillors called for this station to be reopened.

In 2026, Sir Lindsay Hoyle reported that Network Rail had agreed to undertake a timetable analysis to assess which existing rail services could potentially call at a reopened Coppull station and what service pattern could be accommodated. The study was funded by Chorley Council. Hoyle stated that the analysis did not constitute approval for the station to be reopened, but described it as an initial step towards assessing its feasibility.

Preceding station	Disused railways	Following station
Standish	West Coast Main Line; North Union Railway	Balshaw Lane and Euxton
