= Leyland railway station =

Railway station in Lancashire, England

Leyland
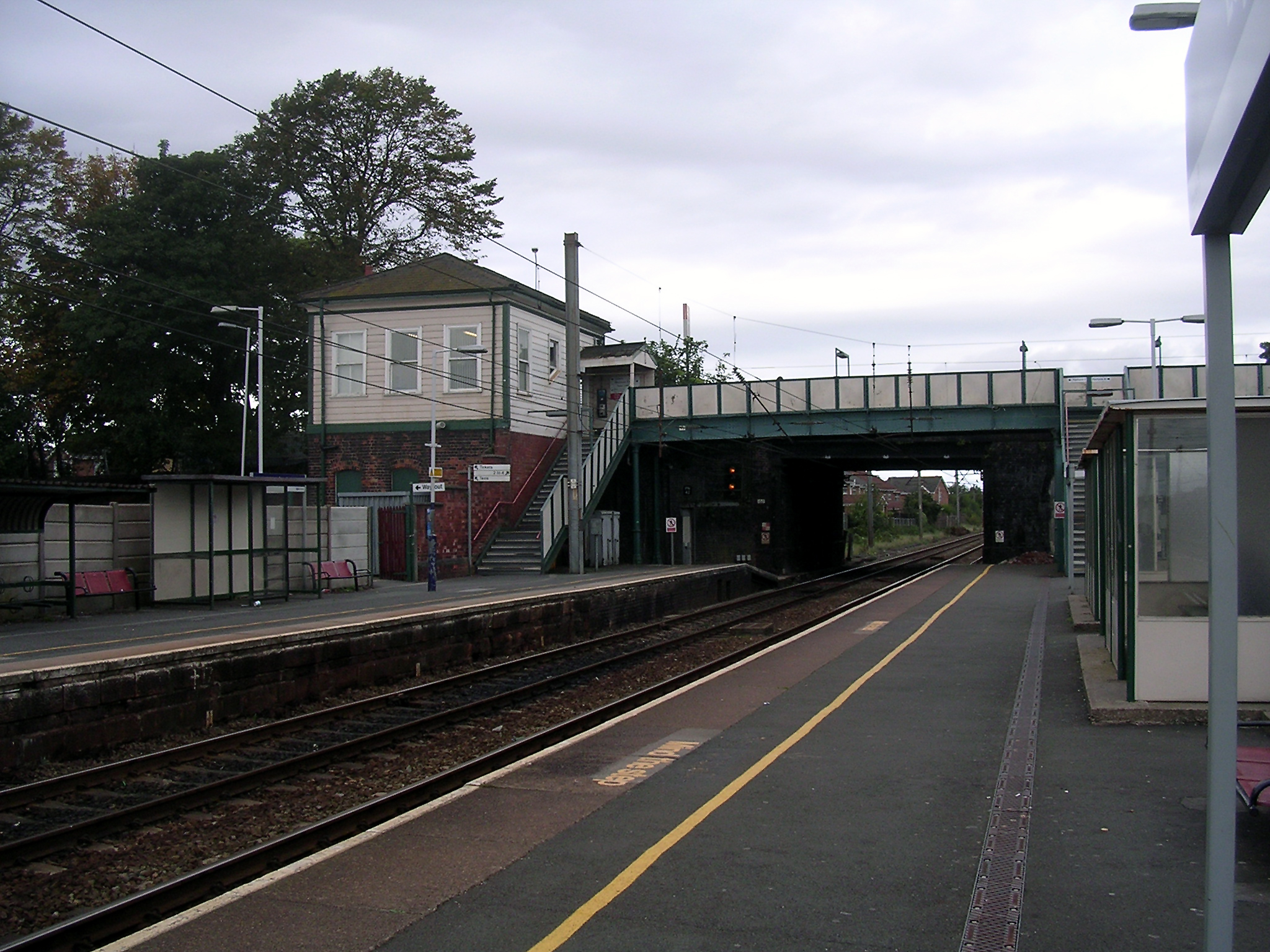
- Leyland railway station platforms 1 and 2 in 2007

General information
- Location: Leyland, South Ribble; England
- Coordinates: 53.699°N 2.687°W
- Grid reference: SD547227
- Managed by: Northern Trains
- Platforms: 4

Other information
- Station code: LEY
- Classification: DfT category D

History
- Original company: North Union Railway
- Pre-grouping: London and North Western Railway
- Post-grouping: London Midland and Scottish Railway

Key dates
- 31 October 1838: Opened as Golden Hill
- 1838: Renamed Leyland

Passengers
- 2020/21: ▼95,220
- 2021/22: ▲0.312 million
- 2022/23: ▲0.333 million
- 2023/24: ▲0.394 million
- 2024/25: ▲0.451 million
Location
Notes
- Passenger statistics from the Office of Rail and Road

Leyland railway station serves the town of Leyland in Lancashire, England. It was formerly "Golden Hill", the name of the street and area in which the station is based, but was renamed Leyland soon after opening. The original station was built in 1838, with two platforms.

== Station ==
The station is located on the West Coast Main Line just south of Preston, and is the approximate halfway point between Glasgow and London, some 198 miles in either direction, with a placard on Leyland Trucks' Spurrier works stating this fact.

The station is currently a four-platform hub, with a part-time ticket office (staffed 06:45-17:45 Mondays to Saturdays and 08:15-15:45 Sundays). In 2011 new digital display screens were installed as well as an automated ticket machine and a new ticket office was built in 2014; A new pedestrian footbridge with lifts was built in 2016 bringing step-free access to all four platforms and an automated PA system was installed in 2018.

Former franchise holder First North Western ran Euston services from Blackpool, which called at Leyland in the late 1990s; but these were soon discontinued. Leyland station is now very much a commuter station from and to Preston, with links to Chorley, Wigan, Liverpool (after years of no "southbound" services towards Wigan a 'local' service was resumed in 1988) and Manchester, with no long distance main line services calling at the station. Before the electrification of the line via Bolton in 2019, services operated to both main stations in Manchester (and before 1988 purely to Manchester Victoria), but there have been no direct services to Victoria since the December 2022 timetable change. Passengers wishing to reach there must now change at either Bolton or Salford Crescent.

The station at Farington, Farington railway station was closed before the Beeching Plan of the 1960s and no direct trains run to Lostock Hall.

Six-carriage (coupled 3-car) Class 331 units run on most services to/from Manchester and some services to/from Liverpool. The previous platforms were too short to allow all doors to open at Leyland, and only the front four carriages were able to be opened. Works were undertaken in 2023 and 2024 to extend the platforms to allow all doors to open, and as of December 15th 2024, six-carriage services operate fully at the station.

== Services ==
The station is served exclusively by Northern Trains trains from Liverpool Lime Street and Manchester Airport to Blackpool North.

As of May 2025, there are 2 trains per hour southbound to Manchester Airport via Chorley and Manchester Piccadilly and 1 train per hour to Liverpool Lime Street, with the latter running semi-fast between Wigan and Liverpool. All trains northbound call at Preston and terminate at Blackpool North. On Sundays, 1 train per hour runs on both routes. The Sunday service to Liverpool Lime Street becomes a stopping service and calls at most intermediate stations between Blackpool North and Liverpool Lime Street.

== Gallery ==
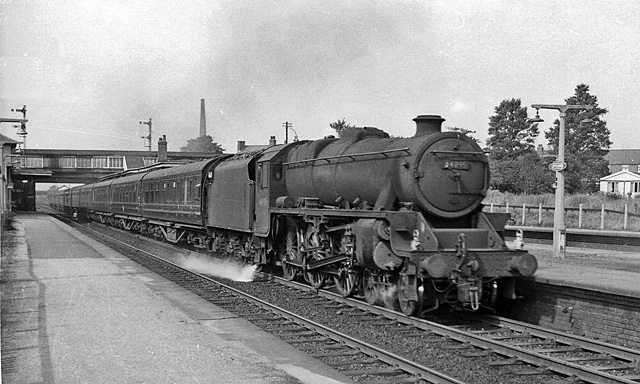
The station in 1963

Preceding station	National Rail	Following station
Preston	Northern Trains Blackpool North to Manchester Airport	Buckshaw Parkway
Preston	Northern Trains Blackpool North to Liverpool Lime Street	Euxton Balshaw Lane
	Historical railways	
Farington; Line open, station closed	North Union Railway	Euxton (L&NW); Line open, station closed
Farington; Line open, station closed	North Union Railway	Euxton (L&Y); Line open, station closed
