= Buckshaw Parkway railway station =

Railway station in Chorley, England

Buckshaw Parkway
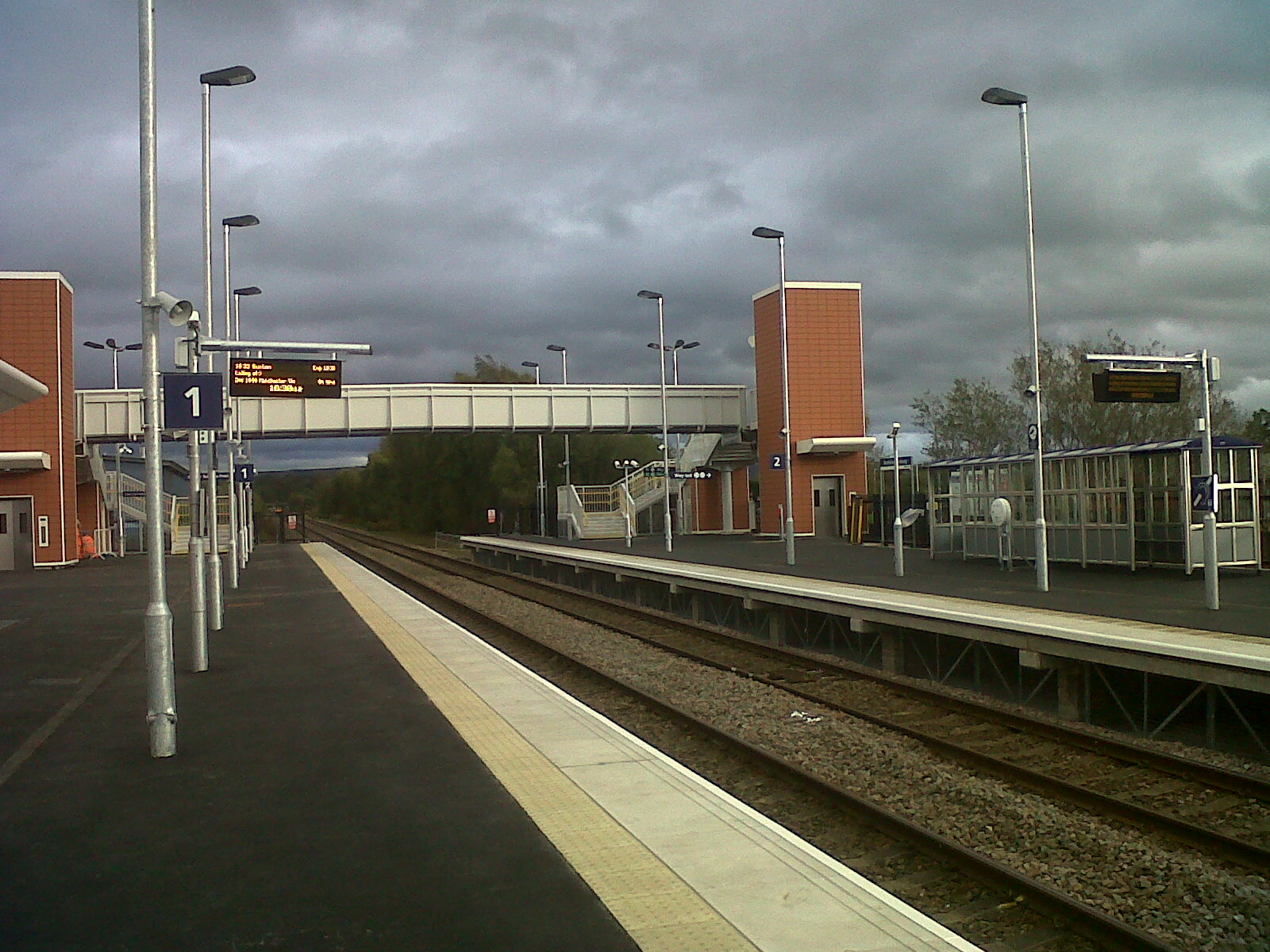
- Buckshaw Parkway railway station in October 2011, prior to completion of electrification works

General information
- Location: Buckshaw Village, Euxton, Chorley; England
- Coordinates: 53.673°N 2.659°W
- Grid reference: SD566198
- Manager: Northern Trains
- Platforms: 2

Other information
- Station code: BSV

History
- Original company: Network Rail

Key dates
- 3 October 2011: Station opened

Passengers
- 2020/21: ▼74,406
- 2021/22: ▲0.268 million
- 2022/23: ▲0.340 million
- 2023/24: ▲0.341 million
- 2024/25: ▲0.355 million
Location
Notes
- Passenger statistics from the Office of Rail and Road

Buckshaw Parkway is a railway station in Lancashire, England which opened on 3 October 2011 on the Manchester to Preston Line, near Euxton Junction with the West Coast Main Line. It is one of Euxton's two railway stations being in Buckshaw Village, formerly the Royal Ordnance Factory (ROF Chorley) between Chorley and Leyland. It is close to the site of the four-platform Chorley ROF Halt, which was closed in 1964, remained virtually intact until the 1970s, but was finally cleared in the early 2000s.

== History ==
The station gained planning permission in 1999. It was put on hold due to a funding shortfall, but it was announced in 2009 that £3.3 million had been allocated by Lancashire County Council from the Community Investment Fund. Construction was expected to begin in early 2010 and be completed in the same year, but a further funding shortfall resulted in the designs for the ticket office being scaled down. Contractors started work in October 2010 and the station was completed by autumn 2011. The cost of the station now stands at £6.8 million. The station opened on 3 October 2011.

The first train arrived on time with journalists from a local paper, the Chorley Guardian, seeking interviews with waiting passengers. IT worker Alex Howarth was the first passenger from the station, whilst a Mr Brown was the first person to buy a ticket from the station.

== Facilities ==
The station has a staffed ticket office, Monday-Saturday 06:20-00:20 Sunday 08:15-23:50 . There is a chargeable car park for around 200 cars. Both platforms are fully accessible (via lifts), with train running information offered via digital CIS displays, automated announcements and timetable posters. The information screens at the station were replaced in March 2023.

== Services ==
All services at the station are operated by Northern Trains. The station has a regular service of 2 trains per hour southbound to Manchester Airport via Manchester Piccadilly, and northbound to Blackpool North. On Sundays, the service is broadly hourly in each direction, but there are some two-hour gaps between services.

There is a crossover to the south of the station which can be used to turn trains around from platform 2 back towards Manchester during disruption or engineering works. The station was previously a scheduled terminus for services from Manchester Victoria between May 2018 and May 2019 during electrification works, but all services now continue north through Preston.

Saturday and Sunday services were replaced by buses most weekends from May 2015 until November 2018 due to the late-running electrification work on the route. Weekend services resumed on Sunday 11 November 2018 after the completion of the electrification engineering work. Travellers from certain local stations needed to change trains here for Preston and Blackpool during this period.

Electric service commenced on 11 February 2019 utilising Class 319 electric multiple units.

Preceding station	National Rail	Following station
Leyland	Northern Trains {{Manchester–Preston line}}	Chorley
