= ROF Chorley =

British munitions filing factory

Coordinates: 53.680°N 2.661°W

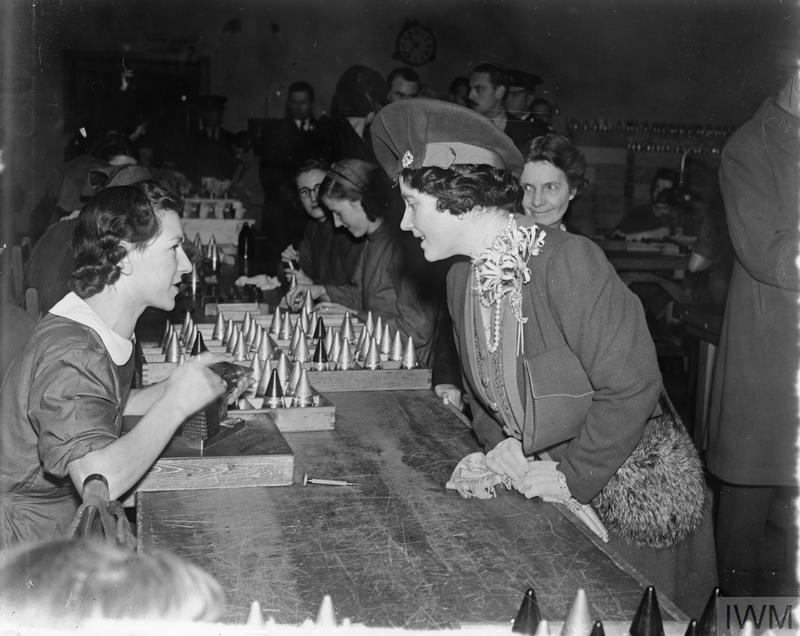
Queen Elizabeth on a visit to the factory in 1941

ROF Chorley was a UK government-owned munitions filling Royal Ordnance Factory (Filling Factory No. 1). It was planned as a permanent Royal Ordnance Factory with the intention that it, unlike some other similar facilities, would remain open for production after the end of World War II; and, together with ROF Bridgend (Filling Factory No. 2), would replace the Royal Filling Factory located at the Royal Arsenal, Woolwich. It was built largely in Euxton, but was known as ROF Chorley.

After the privatization of the Royal Ordnance Factories in the 1980s, on 1 January 1985, it became part of the Ammunition Division of Royal Ordnance plc and later a production unit of BAE Systems Global Combat Systems Munitions. Chorley factory closed in 2005-07 and the majority of the site is now home to the new Buckshaw Village on the outskirts of Chorley, although many remnants remain.

The factory had a storage depot built deep into the Pennine hills, over Chorley, in the village of Heapey; the facility is still in use by BAE although its exact usage has still not been revealed.

== Early history ==
In the late 1930s leading up to the outbreak of war in 1939, the British government developed a strategy to enhance the capacity of the existing three Royal factories and to disperse armaments and munitions production away from major cities and the southeast part of England which were felt to be especially vulnerable to bombing from the air. As a result, the Ministry of Supply built a number of Royal Ordnance Factories and satellite factories. ROF Chorley and ROF Bridgend were the two largest filling factories, but even before they were both finished it was realized that they would not have the necessary capacity to meet Britain's and the British Commonwealth's needs for ammunition. In all some 20 Government-owned World War II Filling Factories were built, but none was so large or employed as many people as these two.

Safety considerations were paramount. The design, style, and spacing of individual production buildings meant that they were separated by wide-open spaces, or, depending on the application, approximately 20 feet (6 m) high grassed embankments and extremely thick reinforced concrete walls and overbridges, called traverses. The purpose of the traverse was to deflect any explosion skyward rather than outward to any adjacent buildings or structures.

=== The site ===
The site was built with extensive underground magazines, comprehensive lightning protection, and individual buildings linked by paths, roads, and railways.

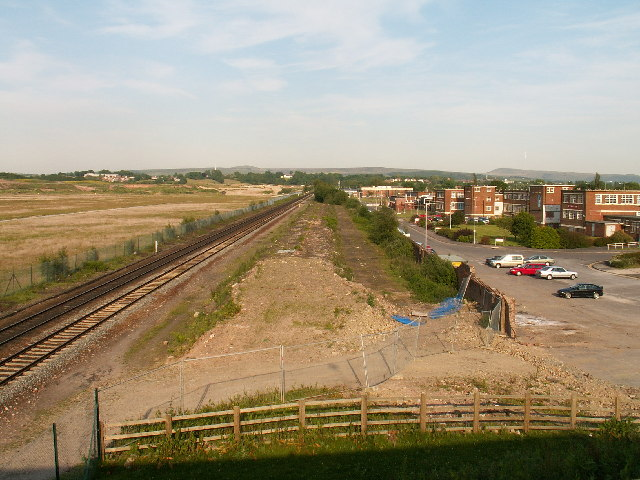
Site of the ROF railway station, 2005. The old administration buildings are on the right and the site of the factory is on the left

The 928-acre (376 ha) site, which was built between Euxton and the town of Leyland, had a 9 mile (approximately 14.5 kilometer) perimeter fence which until privatisation was guarded by what was to become the Ministry of Defence Police (MOD Police) Force. After privatisation they were replaced by private security guards.

The London, Midland and Scottish Railway, from Manchester Victoria to Preston, via Bolton and Euxton junction, with stations at Chorley and Leyland, cut the ROF site into two areas. The smaller area was the Administration site which lay between the railway and Euxton Lane. The factory's main Administration office was located here. It also contained test laboratories, a Medical Centre, the MOD Police, and the main Canteen building. This large canteen was equipped with a stage and was used for Entertainments National Service Association (ENSA) concerts and other entertainments during wartime.

The larger area of the site lay to the north of the railway line and was the main Explosive, or ammunition filling, site.

ROF Chorley had its own private railway station, ROF Halt, which was last used on 27 September 1965. The railway line, particularly the station, was separated from the ROF by brick boundary walls some 20 foot (6 meters) high along each side. Access to the site from the railway station was also by means of an over bridge. The railway station and platforms were demolished in 2002 as the former ROF site was systematically flattened for conversion into housing. The new Buckshaw Parkway railway station, which opened on 3 October 2011, is built close to the site of the old station.

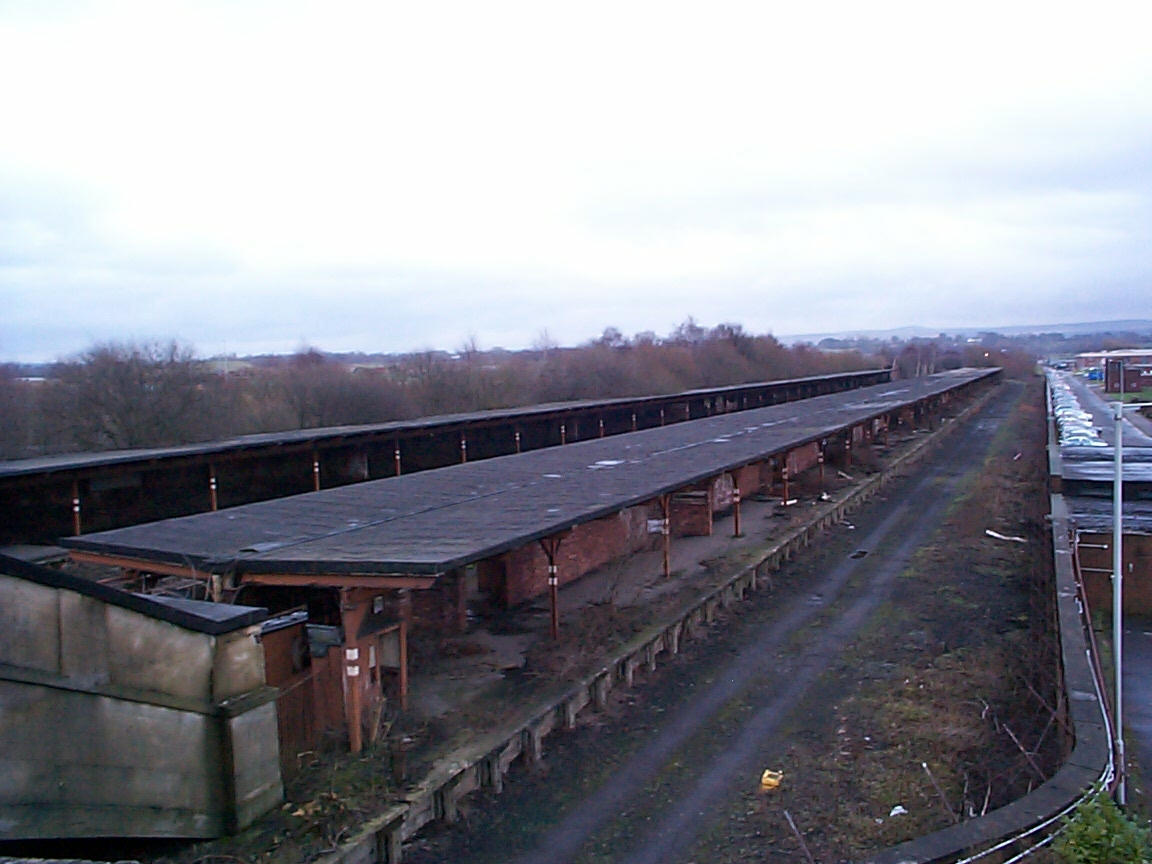
Chorley RoF station in 2001 prior to demolition

The image shown right was taken in January 2001. It clearly shows 2 through platform faces with bays on either side of the main platforms.

The main internal road, the Central Road, linking the two sites, crossed over the railway line by means of a steep road bridge, with footpaths on either side.

There were also separate entrances to the explosive site; one was known as the Leyland Gate. After privatization the road over the railway line was little used and separate entrances, i.e. the Leyland gate and the Euxton gatehouse, were used for the two sites.

== World War II production ==
The new factory employed over 1,000 production workers by the outbreak of the Second World War, in September 1939.

By June 1940, the numbers employed there had risen to nearly 15,000. At its wartime peak, ROF Chorley had over 28,000 employees – a staggering figure at a time when there were only around a dozen factories in the whole of Britain with a workforce each of more than 19,000 people (four of these being the Royal Arsenal, ROF Bishopton, ROF Chorley and ROF Bridgend). ROF Chorley was the site where the bouncing bombs, designed by Barnes Wallis and famed for the Dambusters raid, were filled, the main site for the filling of large-capacity aircraft bombs being ROF Glascoed.

The overall cost of the plant was £13,140,000.

The factory was protected by anti-aircraft artillery that surrounds the facility. One mount that once held the gun with a pillbox was found in Lucas Green near Whittle-le-Woods, refurbished as part of new housing in 2017. The factory was on few occasions in 1940 and 1944 a target for the Germans, but because of its rural location, the Germans would end up bombing its surroundings instead of their main target, hitting a few farms with one time striking a chicken coop.

== Post-war production ==
During the slack period between 1945 and the Korean War ROF Chorley, like ROF Bridgwater and ROF Glascoed, manufactured the concrete components for Airey two-story pre-fabricated concrete houses.

Post War concrete post and beam, factory-built Airey semi-detached house.

ROF Chorley also manufactured concrete railway sleepers and manufactured clothing.

Until the mid-1990s, in the interests of security, British Ordnance Survey maps omitted the ROF sites and showed the location as it existed before the ROF's construction. There was a persistent tale from the 1970s that the town center of the Central Lancashire new town was penciled in to be built on this "empty" site until it was discovered by the planners that the site was owned by the Ministry of Defence and was a licensed high explosive site. More recent editions of the maps show the detail of the buildings, road and rail links, labeled simply as "Works".

== Privatisation ==
After privatization, the headquarters of Royal Ordnance plc was moved to ROF Chorley and was accommodated in a new office block on the "administration site" created out of a former warehouse. The registered office of Royal Ordnance plc, however, remained in London.

The site continued to be known as Royal Ordnance Chorley, or RO Defence, Chorley for some twenty years after privatization; but then lost its name, eventually, becoming a BAE Systems Land Systems site and then a BAE Systems Land and Armaments site. The headquarters function was moved from Chorley to BAE Systems' Filton site.

== Run down and closure ==
In the early 1990s a Long Term strategy was drawn up for the whole site; which involved the decommissioning and decontamination of a significant proportion of the explosives area of the site and its disposal for other uses: mostly housing.

About 400 acres (1.6 km^{2}) was declared surplus, and the buildings were cleaned of explosives by burning them. Some explosives work was carried out on part of the retained site, but this too closed in 2007. In 2000 the Royal Ordnance headquarters function was transferred to BAE System's Filton, Bristol site and more recently to Glascoed in Monmouthshire. Much of this residual site was totally cleared of buildings and a major part was used to build the new Buckshaw Village. Some of the lands was also developed for light industrial use.

The former main administration office building was converted into an adult college and formed part of Runshaw College's, Euxton Lane site. However it was sold in 2022 to Lancashire Constabulary to become the new home for Chorley Police station. Central Road still exists although the bridge deck has been replaced and the road has been upgraded; it is now known as Central Avenue.

In 2009 the former ROF Heapey was decommissioned after BAE Systems stated that a contract with the MOD had finished. The site was sold to Redcliffe International, a specialist in explosives shipping and storage, and is currently licensed for the storage of 192 tonnes of explosives across the Heapey site.

== See also ==
- Filling Factories
- Royal Ordnance Factory
- Royal Ordnance
