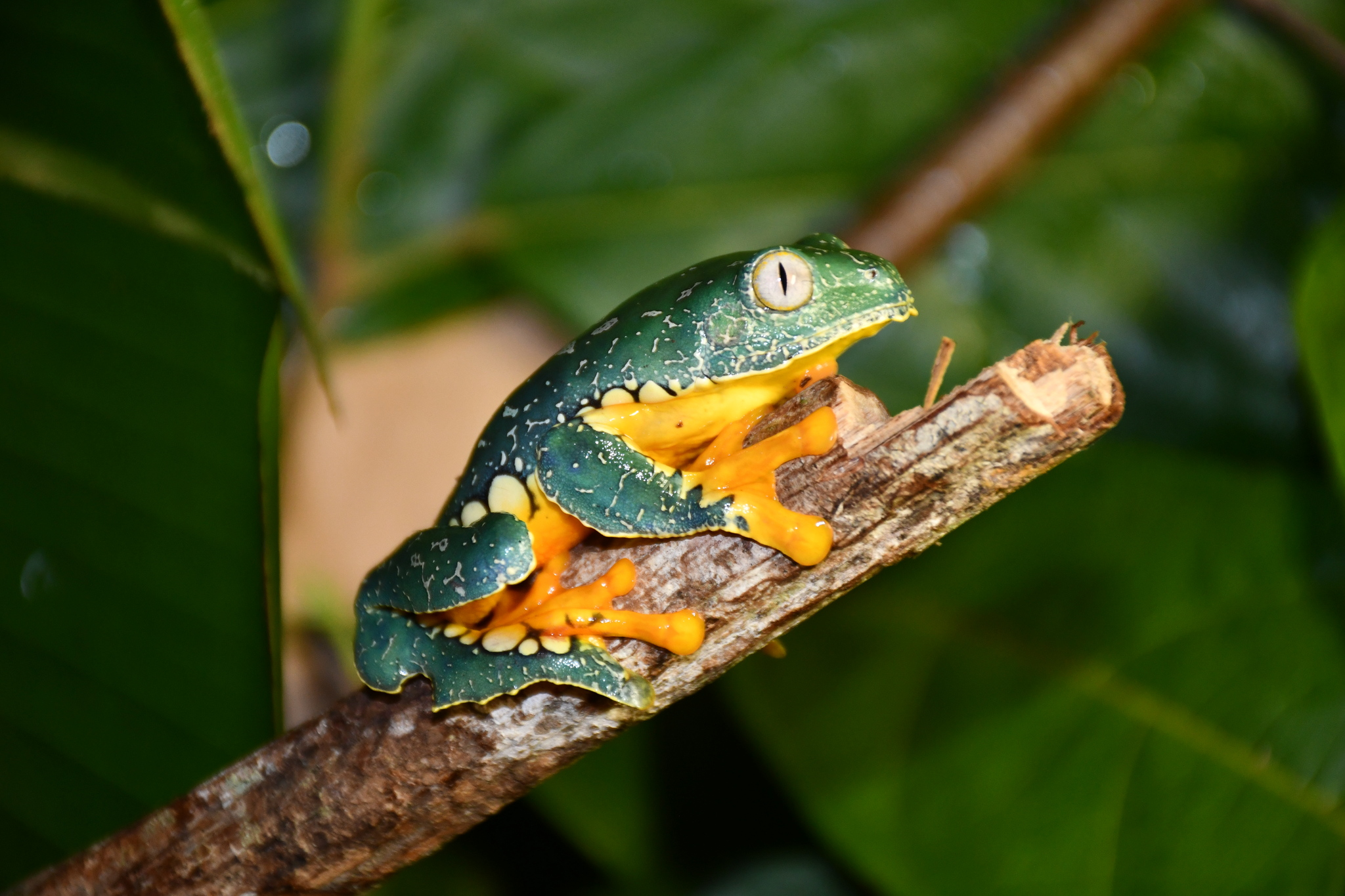

Conservation status
- Least Concern (IUCN 3.1)

Scientific classification
- Kingdom: Animalia
- Phylum: Chordata
- Class: Amphibia
- Order: Anura
- Family: Hylidae
- Genus: Cruziohyla
- Species: C. craspedopus

Binomial name
- Cruziohyla craspedopus (Funkhouser, 1957)

Synonyms
- Phyllomedusa craspedopus (Funkhouser, 1957); Agalychnis craspedopus (Funkhouser, 1957)

= Cruziohyla craspedopus =

Fringe tree frog

Species of amphibian

Cruziohyla craspedopus, the fringed leaf frog or fringed tree frog, is a species of frog in the subfamily Phyllomedusinae. It is found in the Amazonian lowlands in Brazil, Colombia, Ecuador, and Peru, and possibly in Bolivia.

== Description ==
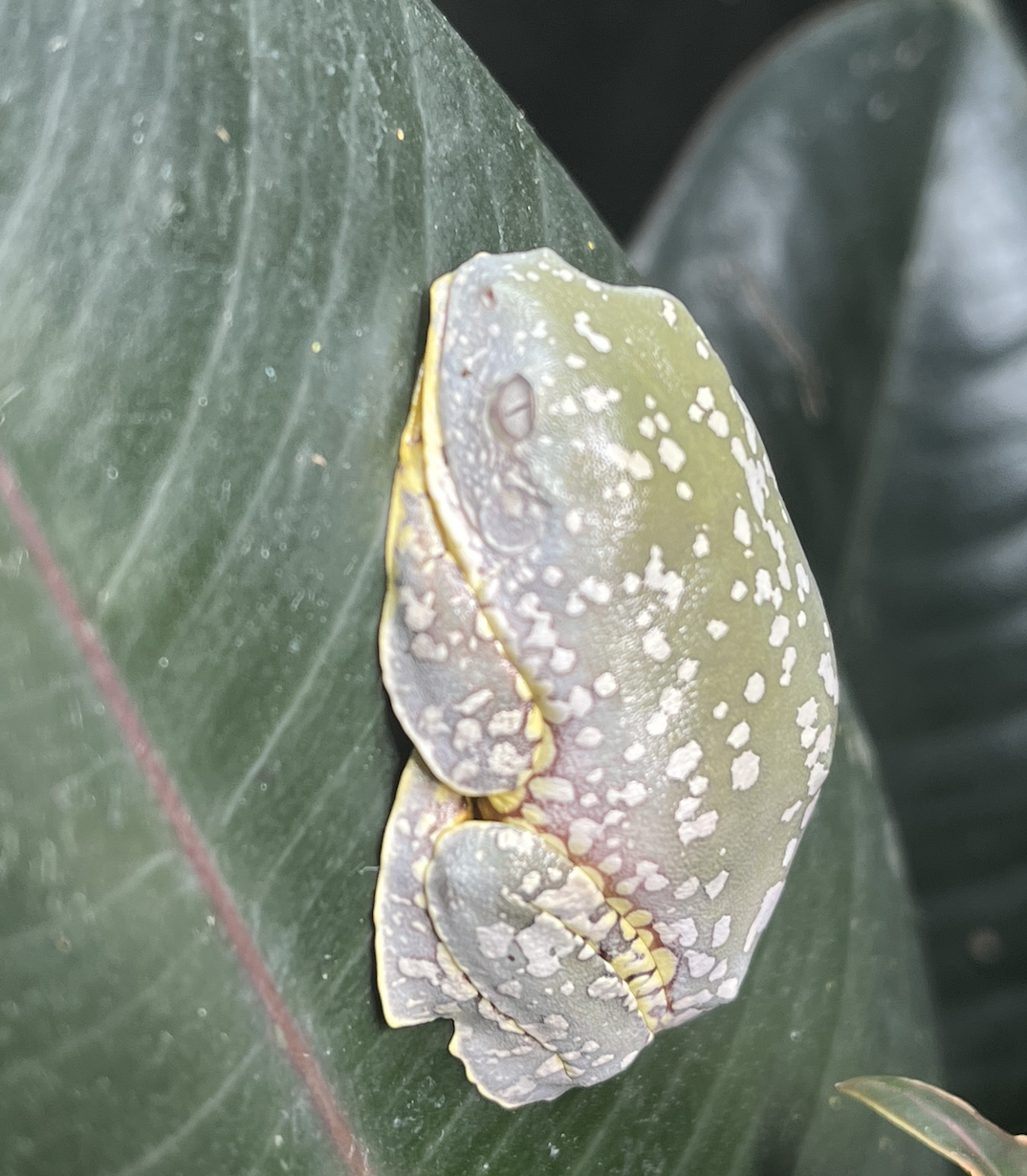
C. craspedopus adhered to a leaf of Ficus elastica.

Cruziohyla craspedopus can be distinguished from other frogs of Cruziohyla by the following characteristics. Adult males measure 53–66 mm (2.1–2.6 in) and adult females 68–76 mm (2.7–3.0 in) in snout–vent length. The head is slightly wider than it is long. The snout is sharply truncate in lateral view. The fingers and toes are webbed. The hind margin of the tarsus bear extensive dermal appendages forming irregular spurs. The dorsum has uniform dark green dorsal background coloration interspersed with irregular-shaped large pale blue-grey lichenose blotches. The flanks have narrow black lines. The undersides and concealed surfaces of the flanks and legs are yellow. When adhered to a surface, the yellow coloration becomes concealed which can aid in camouflage.

== Biology ==
Cruziohyla craspedopus displays a burgundy pigmentation at night. This ability to rapidly color-adapt is mainly caused by levels of the hormone, intermedin, and its effects on chromatophore structure. The dermal chromatophore unit includes xanthophores, iridophores, and melanophores, which function together to display or inhibit certain coloring. The movement of melanosomes to melanophore fingers conceals the light-reflecting iridisphore layer, dictating a darker pigmentation at night. Whereas, the absence of melanosomes in the fingers allows for rapid blanching.

== History ==
Cruziohyla craspedopus was originally named as Phyllomedusa craspedopus by Funkhouser in 1957; then, as Agalychnis craspedopus by Duellman in 1968, as Cruziohyla calcarifer by Faivorvich in 2005, and finally identified as Cruziohyla craspedopus by Andrew Gray in 2018. Andrew Gray identified a new Cruziohyla species in 2018, the Cruziohyla sylviae, which was originally undifferentiated from the Cruziohyla craspedopus .

== Habitat and conservation ==
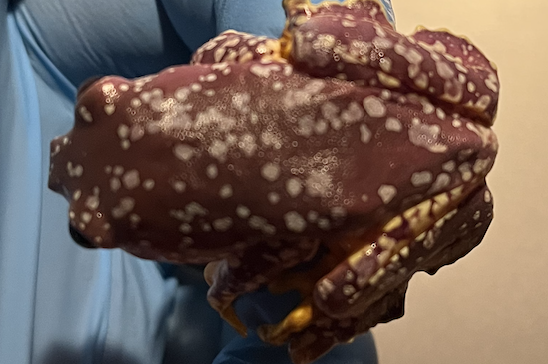
C. craspedopus displaying "nighttime coloration".

Cruziohyla craspedopus is a high-canopy frog of primary tropical lowland rainforest at elevations of 50–600 m (160–1,970 ft) above sea level. It only descends to lower branches for breeding, which takes place in fallen trees holding small water pools. However, tadpoles have also been found in small pools on the ground.

It occurs in several protected areas such as the Yasuni National Park in Ecuador and the Manú National Park in Peru.

Cruziohyla craspedopus is listed as Least Concern in the IUCN Red List of Threatened Species in 2004. However, Cruziohyla craspedopus is a rare species last assessed with a decreasing population trend. It is not facing major threats, but it can locally suffer from habitat loss caused by human activities (e.g., agriculture).
