= Euxton =

Village in Lancashire, England

Coordinates: 53.662°N 2.674°W

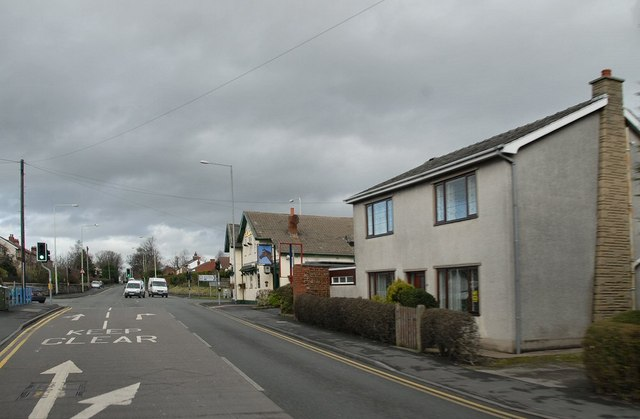
- Euxton lies along the A49 and the A581 roads between Chorley and Leyland.

- Shown within Chorley Borough Location within Lancashire
- Population: 9,993 (2011 Census)
- OS grid reference: SD555186
- Civil parish: Euxton
- District: Chorley
- Shire county: Lancashire
- Region: North West
- Country: England
- Sovereign state: United Kingdom
- Post town: CHORLEY
- Postcode district: PR6, PR7
- Dialling code: 01257
- Police: Lancashire
- Fire: Lancashire
- Ambulance: North West
- UK Parliament: Chorley

Euxton (/ˈɛkstən/ EKS-tən) is a village and civil parish in the Borough of Chorley, Lancashire, England. The population at the 2011 census was 9,993, but is now estimated to be around 14,000 due to housing developments in the village, including at Buckshaw. The village is just to the west of Chorley, and south of Clayton-le-Woods.

Euxton covers an area around 2.5 miles (4.0 km) from east to west and 2 miles (3.2 km) north to south. The village is made up of several areas including Runshaw Moor, Balshaw, Shaw Green, Daisy Hill, Buckshaw, Pincock, Primrose Hill, Glead Hill, Dawbers, Spout Hillock, Culbeck and Pear Tree.

The boundaries of Euxton have remained largely unchanged, as they follow a series of natural waterways. The northern boundary is formed by Worden Brook, which runs through the centre of Buckshaw Village and becomes Shaw Brook, marking the border between Euxton and Leyland. To the east, the boundary was historically defined by German Brook and German Lane (now Washington Lane), whereas the boundary is now broadly aligned with West Way. The southern boundary is formed by the River Yarrow, while to the west, the parish boundary follows historic field lines from Runshaw Moor southwards to the point where the A581 changes from Dawbers Lane to Southport Road near the Elephant Restaurant and on to the Yarrow.

Euxton is served by five primary schools: Balshaw Lane Primary, Primrose Hill Primary, Euxton C of E Primary, Euxton RC Primary and Trinity C of E/Methodist Primary School.

== History ==
Euxton's original village settlement in Pincock was based near the ford over the River Yarrow, along the route of the old Roman road Watling Street – now the A49 road – that runs through the length of the village, from Pincock to Packsaddle.

Demonstrating its significance, Euxton had a market charter granted in 1301 by Edward I and whilst the area was called Euxton, the township was called Euxtonburgh. The name suggests an Anglo-Saxon origin. It has been suggested that it is derived from "Efe's Tun", with "tun" referring to a farmstead and Efe being a personal name and the later addition of burgh suggesting the settlement had grown and been fortified.

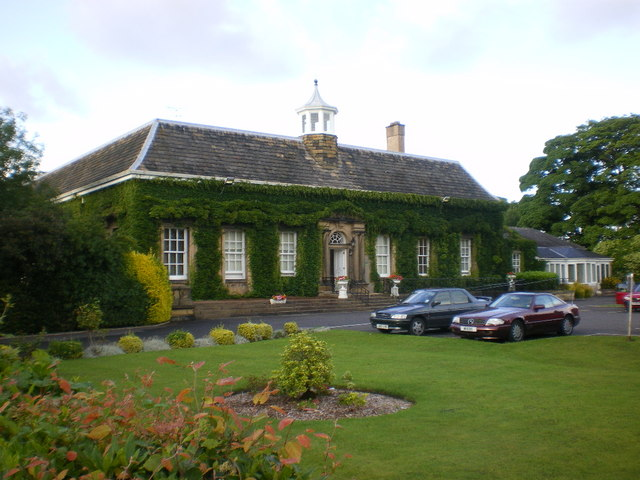
Euxton Hall

The manorial seat was Euxton Hall owned first by the Molyneux family and later by the Anderton family. A new manor house is said to have been built in the early 16th century by Hugh Anderton (1466-1516/17). It is likely that the manor would have been located closer to the parish church. A new hall was built by William Anderton (c.1708-44) in 1769 and rebuilt on the same site but on a grander scale in 1850. Euxton Hall is now a private hospital and is made up of the lower ground floor of hall as the upper floor was demolished following a fire.

Charles II lodged at Euxton Hall in 1651 when on his way south to Worcester, he is said to have drunk water from the stream at the edge of Euxton describing it as "Cul Beck" or cool brook giving it its name, from whence the area takes its name.

The hall had three lodge houses, one at the bottom of Chapel Brow, one at main gates of Euxton Park on Wigan Road and one on Dawber's Lane which is now much extended and known as Dower House. The centre of the village later moved from the old ford to be closer to Euxton Hall and its chapel (now Euxton Parish Church).

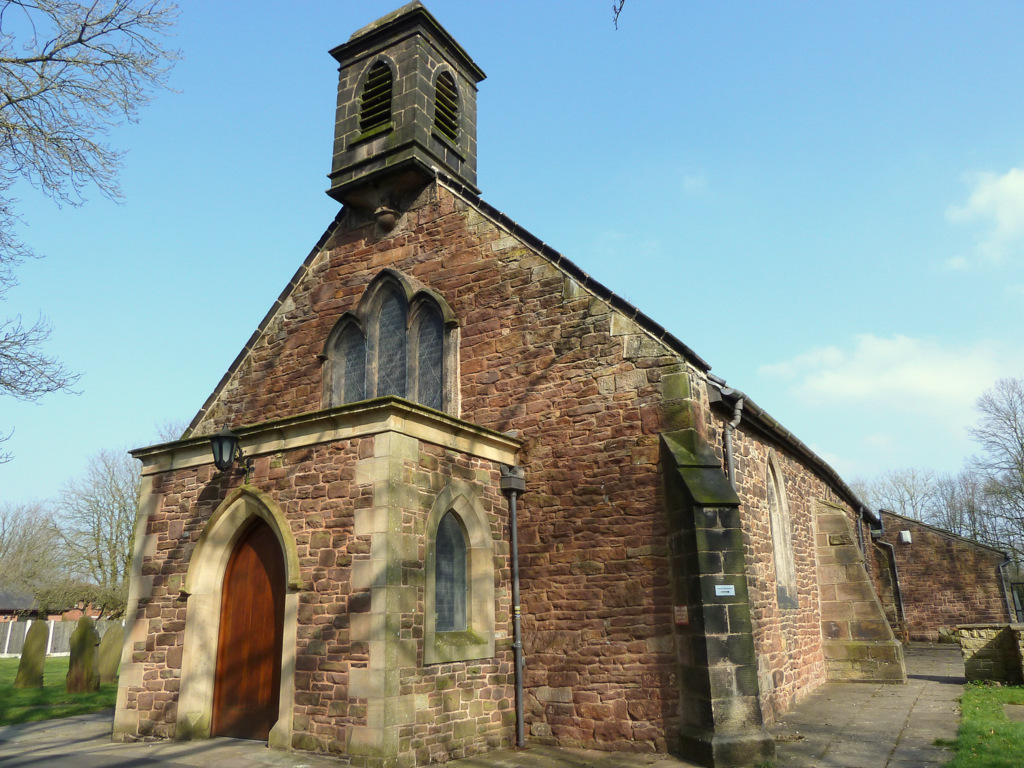
Euxton Parish Church (geograph 4403183)

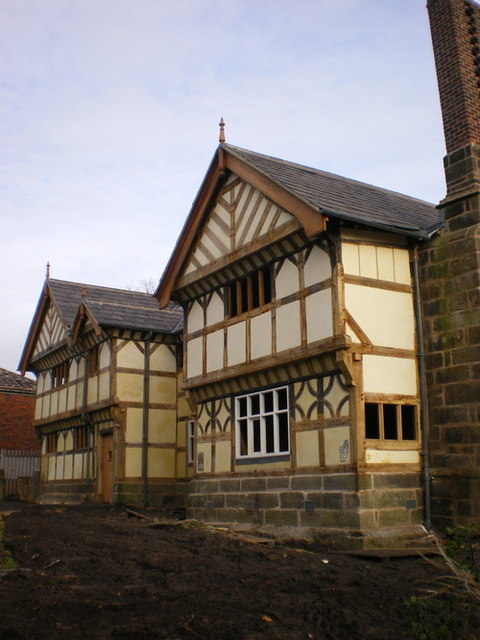
Buckshaw Hall

Whilst the oldest extant building is believed to be the parish church and although Euxton Hall is likely to be older in places, dating back to 1662, Armetriding Farm is believed to be the oldest dwelling house.

One of the most significant buildings in Euxton is Buckshaw Hall, an H-plan two-storey timber framed property on a sandstone base, with both brick and wattle and daub infilling and a slate roof. It is considered to be one of the best preserved Tudor halls in Lancashire.

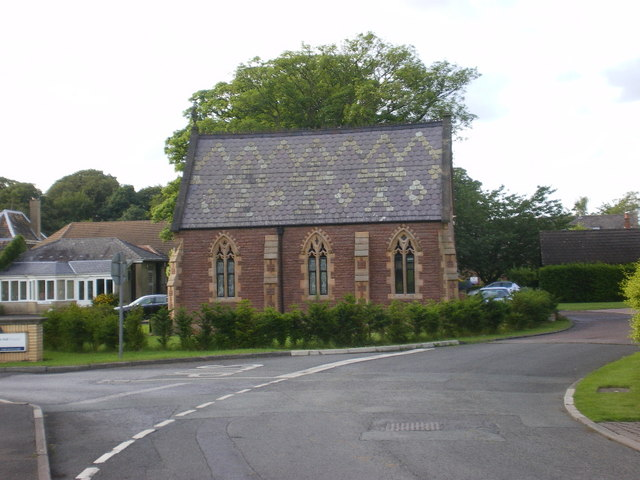
Euxton Hall

Euxton Hall Chapel was designed by architect E. W. Pugin (1834–1875), and built in 1866 as a private chapel for the Anderton family who lived in Euxton Hall.

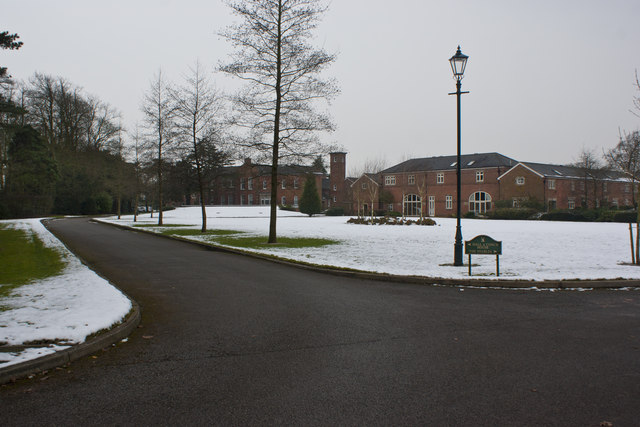
Runshaw Hall

There has been a building at Runshaw Hall since medieval times and the current house was built in 1862 and later acquired by William Bretherton.

== Early industry ==
Euxton Hall, which was a significant stately residence, now acts as a private hospital and is half its former glory, with the second storey being removed in the 20th century along with its grand colonnade. Euxton Hall's 19th century gatehouses can be seen at the bottom of Chapel Brow, near the parish church whilst the other gatehouse can be seen at the entrance of Euxton Hall Gardens. Earlier gatehouses were previously located on Dawbers Lane and Runshaw Lane. Balshaw Lodge, which has recently been redeveloped, was originally built as guest lodgings for the hall.

There was a large Royal Ordnance Factory (ROF Chorley) built here in the buildup to the Second World War (Nevell et al., 1999). At its peak the factory employed over 40,000 people, and had its own railway station. It was probably the biggest munitions filling factory in the world, and it is said that the bouncing bombs used in the Dambusters raid were made there. ROF Chorley later came under the ownership of British Aerospace, and in subsequent years was closed down with the land being sold. In the early 2000s the former ROF Chorley site was effectively flattened and sanitised, so that the land could be transformed into the new Buckshaw Village.

== Modern industry ==
Plans by Tarmac to operate a sand quarry near the village were approved in August 2008 by a planning inspector. The quarry, to be located between Runshaw Lane and Dawber's Lane, had been proposed for ten years and is opposed by the village council, and by local residents, some of whom set up an action group, Euxton Residents Against Sand Extraction (ERASE), due to its impact on health, traffic and environment locally. The quarry has permission to operate for 15 years.

== Estates and public houses ==
The village also has seven public houses; the Talbot, the Euxton Mills, the Bobbin Mill, the Bay Horse, the Traveller's Rest, the Plough and the War Horse (in the Buckshaw part of Euxton).

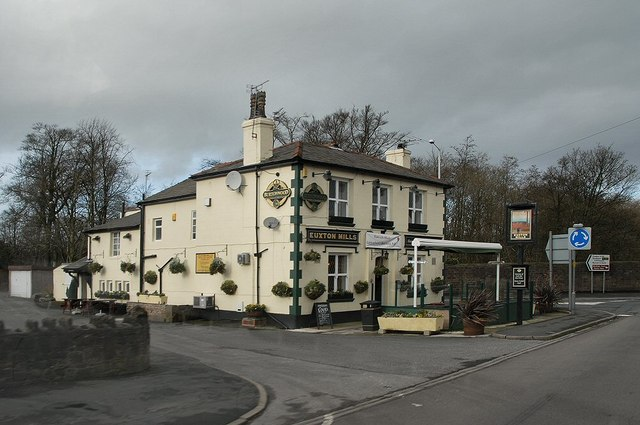
Euxton Mills - geograph.org.uk - 1536029

Euxton has several large housing estates, particularly in the eastern half of the village built in the late 1960s by Trevor Hemmings. The Talbot Estate lies to the east of Euxton and the Greenside Estate to the north on Runshaw Lane.

Newer housing estates include Wentworth Drive to the north-east of the village and Church Walk and Park Avenue to the west.

Euxton's population was significantly increased after the Royal Ordnance Factory in Buckshaw was demolished and redeveloped, creating a huge new residential and commercial area in the north of the village.

== Transport ==
The north-south M6 motorway lies to the west of the village. Access from the M6 is by junction 28 for the A49 road at nearby Clayton-le-Woods.

Euxton has two railway stations, with stopping services operated by Northern:

- Euxton Balshaw Lane railway station is sited on the West Coast Main Line, between Preston and Wigan. Services operate hourly in each direction between Liverpool Lime Street and Blackpool North. The station was re-opened in 1997, after a gap of some 30 years.
- Buckshaw Parkway railway station was opened in 2011 to serve the new Buckshaw Village development. It is on the Manchester-Preston line, with direct destinations include Chorley, Bolton, Preston, Barrow, Blackpool, Manchester Piccadilly and Manchester Airport.

Euxton is home to three listed railway bridges: Pincock Bridge, Old Station Bridge (Wigan Road) and Bay Horse Brow (Euxton Lane). There are also bridges on School Lane and Balshaw Lane.

Bus services are operated primarily by Stagecoach Merseyside & South Lancashire.

== Sport ==
The former ROF Chorley sports ground was used by English football team Bolton Wanderers as its training headquarters. On 19 February 2016, the training facility was sold by Bolton Wanderers to Wigan Athletic whilst on 1 September 2020 Wigan sold it to Preston North End.

The village is also home to Euxton Corinthians F.C., Euxton Villa F.C., Euxton Girls F.C. and Euxton Cricket Club. Euxton Villa F.C. have a training ground on Runshaw Lane.

== See also ==
- Listed buildings in Euxton

== Bibliography ==
- Nevell, M., Roberts, J. and Smith, J. (1999) A History of Royal Ordnance Factory, Chorley, Lancaster : Carnegie Publishing, ISBN 1-85936-063-7
