= Oldfield Road railway station =

Former railway station in Greater Manchester, England

Oldfield Road

General information
- Location: Salford, City of Salford; England
- Coordinates: 53.4816°N 2.2659°W
- Grid reference: SJ824983
- Platforms: 2

Other information
- Status: Disused

History
- Original company: Lancashire and Yorkshire Railway

Key dates
- February 1852: Opened as Oldfield Road
- February 1853: Renamed Oldfield Road, Salford
- September 1854: Renamed Salford (Oldfield Road)
- August 1865: Renamed Oldfield Road
- 2 December 1872: Station closed
Location

Oldfield Road railway station served the western part of Salford, in Greater Manchester, England, between 1852 and 1872.

== History ==
The railway line between Salford and Bolton was built by the Manchester, Bolton and Bury Railway (MB&BR) and opened on 29 May 1838. Originally, Salford was a terminus; in October 1846, when the MB&B line was connected to the Liverpool and Manchester Railway (L&MR) in order to gain access to Manchester Victoria, this connection bypassed Salford.

To cater for Salford passengers using Manchester trains, the Lancashire and Yorkshire Railway, successor to the MB&BR, provided an intermediate station at Oldfield Road, approximately 1/2 mile (800 m) to the west of Salford station; it opened in February 1852. In February 1853 it was renamed Oldfield Road, Salford; and in September 1854 it became Salford (Oldfield Road).

A direct connecting line between Salford and Manchester Victoria was opened on 1 August 1865 and, as a result, trains from Bolton to Manchester Victoria could now call at Salford; that month, Salford (Oldfield Road) resumed its original name of Oldfield Road. The 1865 connecting line made Oldfield Road redundant, but it was not closed until 2 December 1872.

| Preceding station | Historical railways | Following station |
|---|---|---|
| Windsor Bridge, Pendleton; Line open, station closed | Lancashire and Yorkshire Railway | Salford; Line and station open |
