= Farnworth railway station =

Railway station in Greater Manchester, England

Farnworth
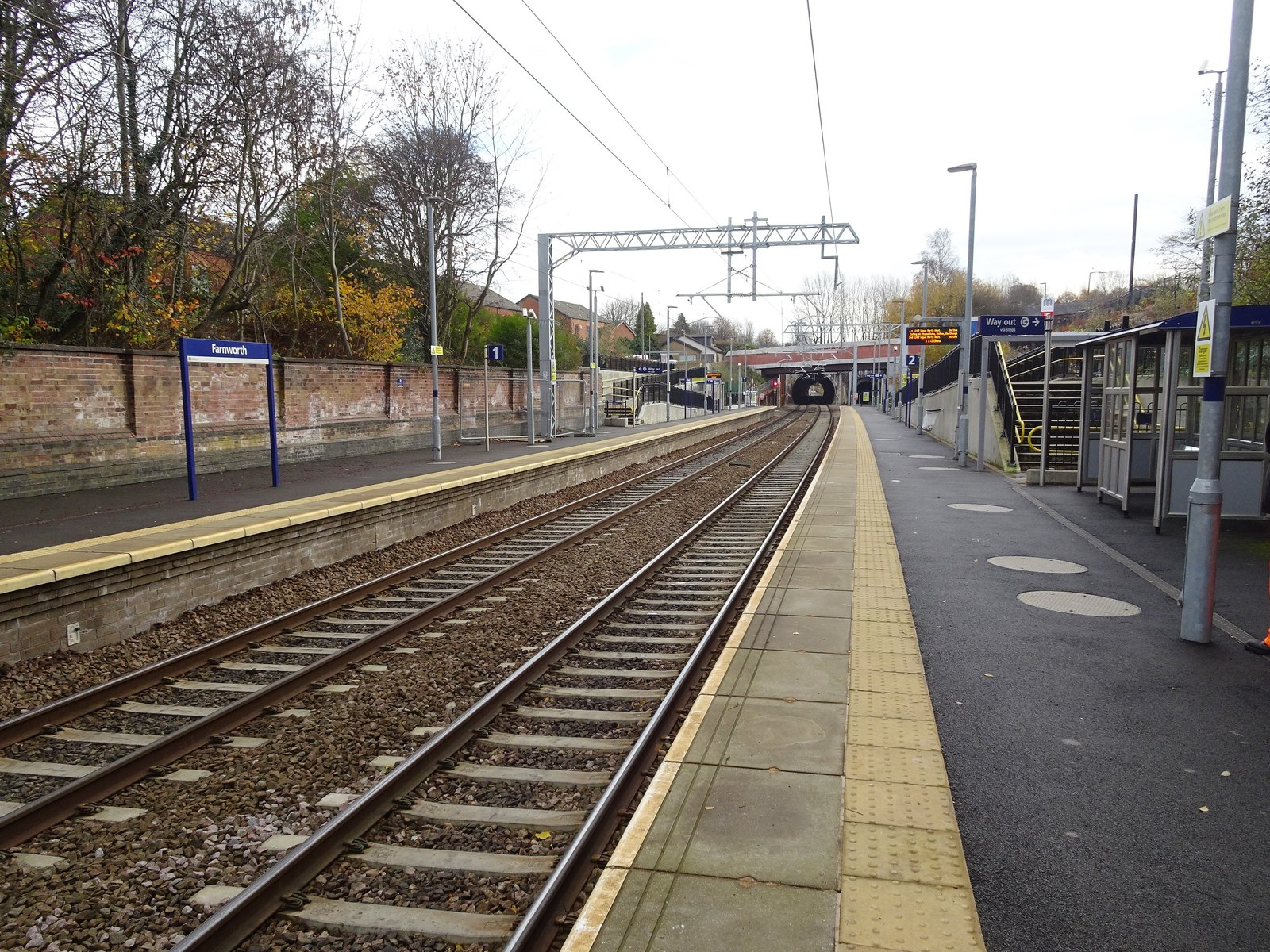

General information
- Location: Farnworth, Bolton; England
- Coordinates: 53.5503°N 2.3882°W
- Grid reference: SD743060
- Manager: Northern Trains
- Transit authority: Greater Manchester
- Platforms: 2

Other information
- Station code: FNW
- Classification: DfT category E

History
- Original company: Manchester, Bolton and Bury Railway
- Pre-grouping: Lancashire and Yorkshire Railway
- Post-grouping: London, Midland and Scottish Railway

Key dates
- 29 May 1838: Station opened as Tunnel
- 1841: Station closed
- September 1845: Reopened as Halshaw Moor
- May 1852: Renamed Halshaw Moor and Farnworth
- January 1870: Renamed Farnworth and Halshaw Moor
- 6 May 1974: Renamed Farnworth
- 2015-2016: Rebuilt

Passengers
- 2021/22: ▲43,744
- 2022/23: ▲48,002
- 2023/24: ▲53,000
- 2024/25: ▼50,790
- 2025/26: ▲62,142
Location
Notes
- Passenger statistics from the Office of Rail and Road

Farnworth railway station serves the town of Farnworth, in the Greater Manchester, England. The station underwent several name changes before the present name was adopted in 1974.

It lies on the Manchester-Preston Line 8 1/2 miles (13.7 km) north of Manchester Victoria, though only local services run by Northern Trains call here.

The station received a minor upgrade in 2009, with the addition of automated electronic information display systems and automated announcements audio system similar to the system at Lostock station. A more substantial rebuild, involving platform realignment, was undertaken in 2015-2016 as part of works to electrify the Manchester-Preston line. The station has a ticket office, which is staffed from 06:30 to 13:00 on weekdays only (closed Saturdays and Sundays). Outside of these times, tickets must be purchased on the train or prior to travel. Step-free access to both platforms is via ramps from the station entrance.

== History ==
The station was first opened by the Manchester, Bolton and Bury Railway on 29 May 1838, and was originally named Tunnel. This station closed in 1841, but was reopened in September 1845, when it took the name of Halshaw Moor. In May 1852 it was renamed Halshaw Moor and Farnworth; in January 1870 Farnworth and Halshaw Moor; and finally on 6 May 1974 it became Farnworth.

=== Farnworth Tunnel ===
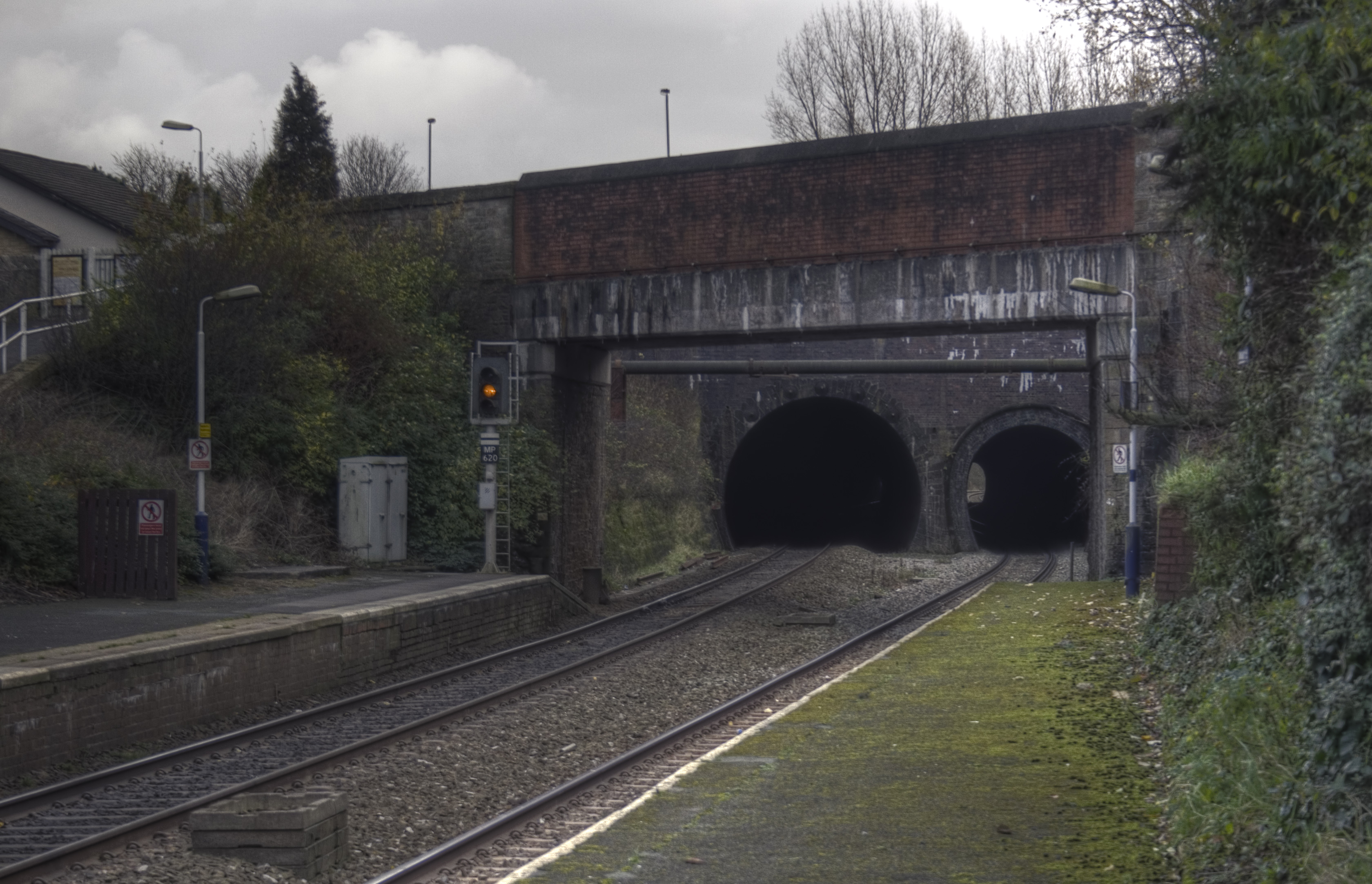
The north-west ends of Farnworth tunnel, prior to the 2015 reconstruction. Original tunnel (re-bored in 2015) on left; additional smaller bore of 1880 on right.

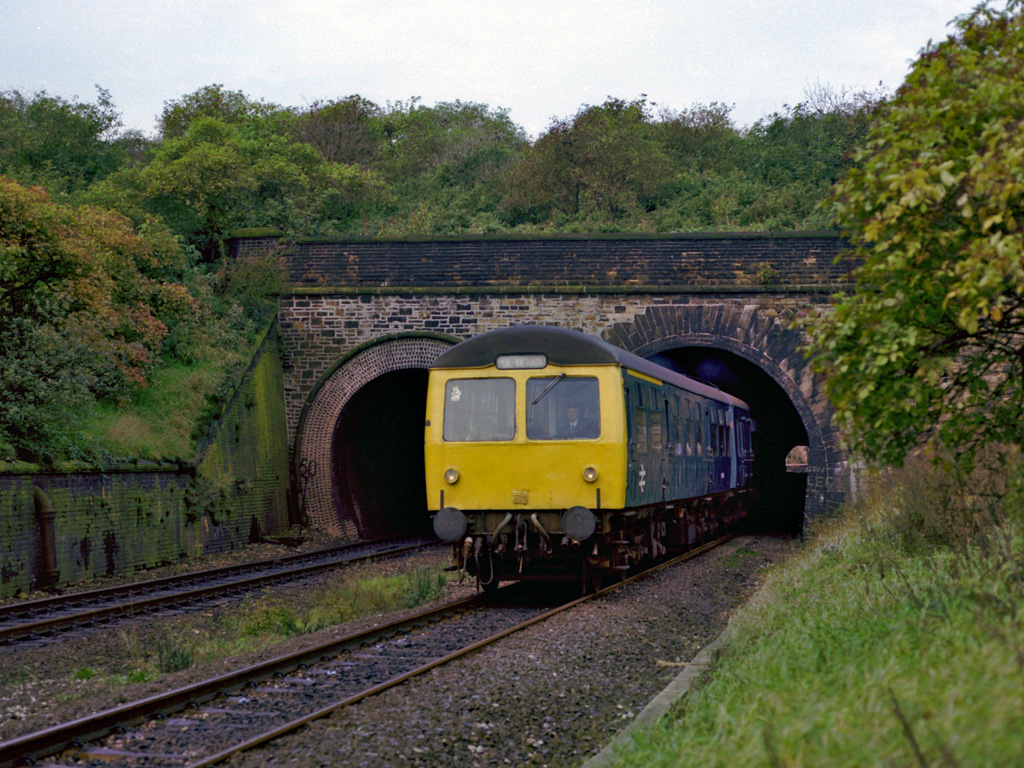
The south-east ends of Farnworth tunnel in 1982; the train is emerging from the original tunnel

To the south-east of the station is Farnworth Tunnel, which had two single-track bores, although when built it had one double-track bore. Originally there was intended to be a cutting, but a tunnel was substituted. This was dug from both ends and also from a shaft at the centre; the main difficulty in construction being the nature of the ground, which consisted of wet sand and clay. It is 295 yards (270 m) long, although Network Rail has erected tunnel entrance nameboards that incorrectly read 294 yds.

The Lancashire and Yorkshire Railway (L&YR) route north from Blackburn to Hellifield was completed on 1 June 1880, and the Midland Railway (MR) proposed to use this route for a through service between Manchester Victoria and Scotland. The MR intended to use Pullman cars, which were larger than the L&YR coaches, and it was found that some of the tunnels on the route were too small and would need to be enlarged. Among these was Farnworth tunnel, which was also in need of extensive repairs; so instead of enlarging it, it was decided to build a second tunnel alongside, to the south-west of the original. The new down (northbound) single-line tunnel was commenced on 26 April 1880 and brought into use on 5 December that year, although Parliamentary approval for its construction had not been obtained: it was applied for in February 1881 and granted retrospectively (as part of the Lancashire and Yorkshire Railway Act 1881, 44 & 45 Vic chapter 135) on 18 July that year. Once it was in use, the two tracks through the original tunnel were replaced by a single track along the centre; the tunnel lining was repaired and thickened, and this tunnel then formed the up (southbound) single-line tunnel.

As part of the electrification scheme of the 2010s, the original tunnel has been enlarged to allow sufficient clearance for the overhead wires and for both lines to be routed through it once again. During this period, the 1880 bore was initially retained to permit a limited diesel service over the route to continue during the upgrade work, and after was then abandoned as clearances within are too restricted to allow safe operation with overhead wires. This has also required realignment of the lines approaching it and consequent alterations to the platforms that they serve. Work began in May 2015, when the 1838 bore was closed, filled in with cement and re-bored to a larger diameter using the largest tunnel boring machine ever built in Britain. During tunnelling, the workers ran into loose/soft sand, which caused the project to be delayed from October to December and also led to the temporary closure of some lanes on the A666 road above for safety reasons. The TBM finally bored through on 25 October 2015, 21 days after the scheduled completion date. The newly widened tunnel reopened on 14 December 2015, after a scheduled engineering possession on the preceding weekend to connect and test the track & signalling equipment. The first train through was the 05:30 on 15 December from Horwich Parkway station, and the first passenger to use it was former councillor Andrew Morley. At the end of January 2016, the tunnel was once again closed to enable replacement of the temporary tracks and their replacement with tracks suitable for 100 mph running. Overhead wiring was later installed through the tunnel and electric trains were introduced along the route from Monday 11 February 2019, initially utilising Class 319 electric multiple units.

== Services ==
There is an hourly service northbound to Southport via Bolton and Wigan Wallgate and southwards and eastwards to Manchester Victoria and Stalybridge throughout the day Mondays to Fridays. A small number of early morning and evening services run to/from Wigan North Western.

Services were suspended for several months due to the tunnel and station upgrade works mentioned above – they have now resumed, as the project has been completed. Originally planned to end in October 2015, this was subsequently extended to the December 2015 timetable change. The extension to the works was caused by excessive wet sand deposits being discovered in the overlaying land by Network Rail engineers, severely hampering the progress of the boring machine. The station reopened (along with the tunnel) on 14 December 2015.

Before the May 2018 timetable change, no evening weekday service operated aside from a solitary late evening train to Bolton and Wigan. As of July 2018, Saturday trains were replaced by buses as a result of ongoing engineering line blockages to progress the delayed electrification scheme mentioned previously (which was more than two years behind schedule) – this was finally completed in November 2018, and Saturday trains began running again the following month.

As of May 2025, the station is served on Sundays by the hourly service from Wigan North Western to Stalybridge (the only one to be served on Sundays on the line between Salford and Bolton).

Preceding station	National Rail	Following station
Moses Gate	Northern Trains Southport to Stalybridge Monday to Saturday	Kearsley
Bolton	Northern Trains Wigan North Western to Stalybridge Sunday only	Salford Crescent
