= Manchester–Preston line =

Railway line in the UK

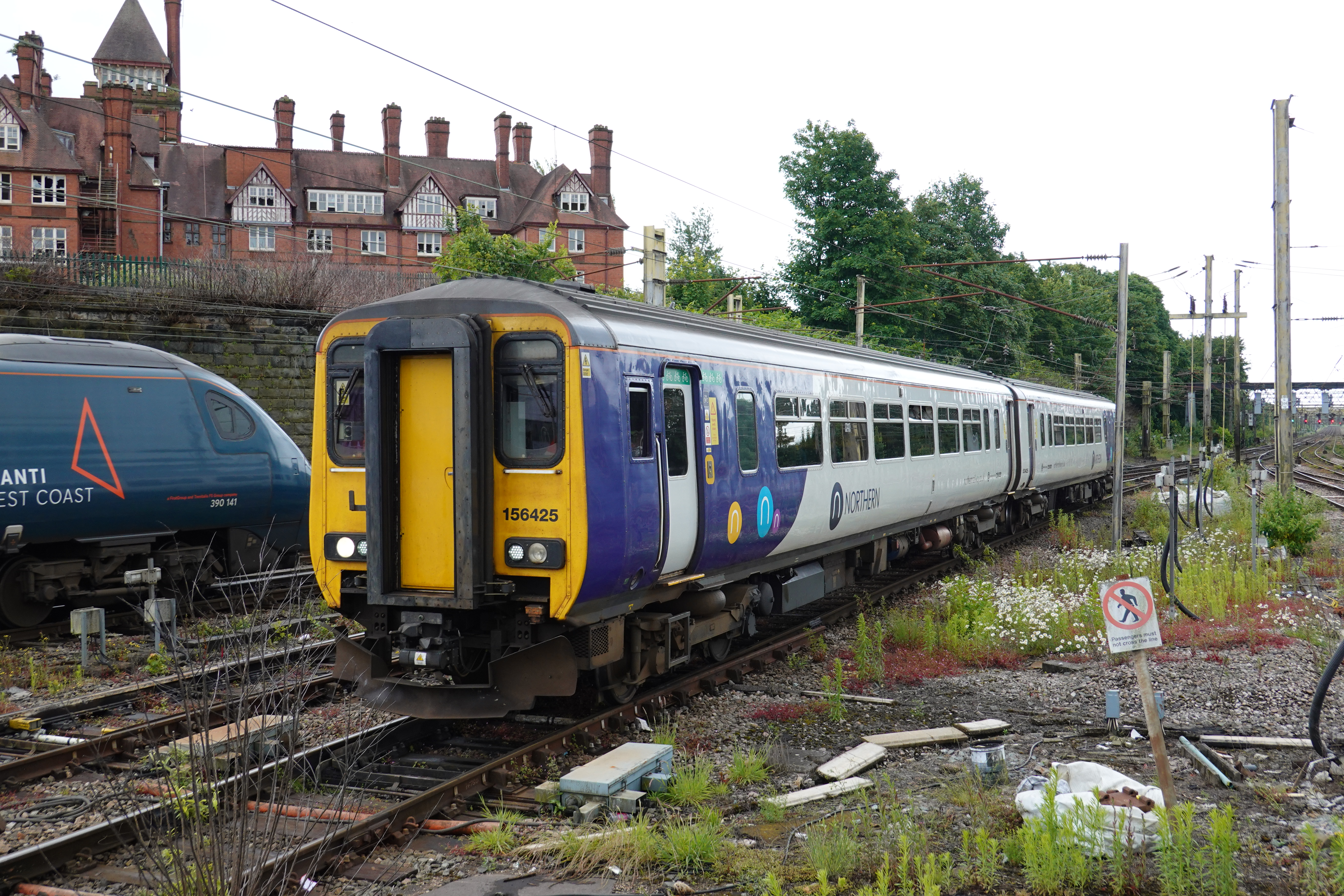
- A Northern Trains Class 156 at Preston, June 2024

Overview
- Status: Operational
- Owner: Network Rail
- Locale: North West England
- Termini: Manchester Victoria; Preston
- Stations: 16

Service
- System: National Rail
- Operator(s): Northern Trains; TransPennine Express
- Rolling stock: Class 150; Class 156; Class 158; Class 185; Class 195; Class 331; Class 397; Class 769; Class 802

Technical
- Track gauge: 1,435 mm (4 ft 8 1/2 in) standard gauge
- Electrification: 25 kV AC 50 Hz OHLE
- Operating speed: 100mph
Route map
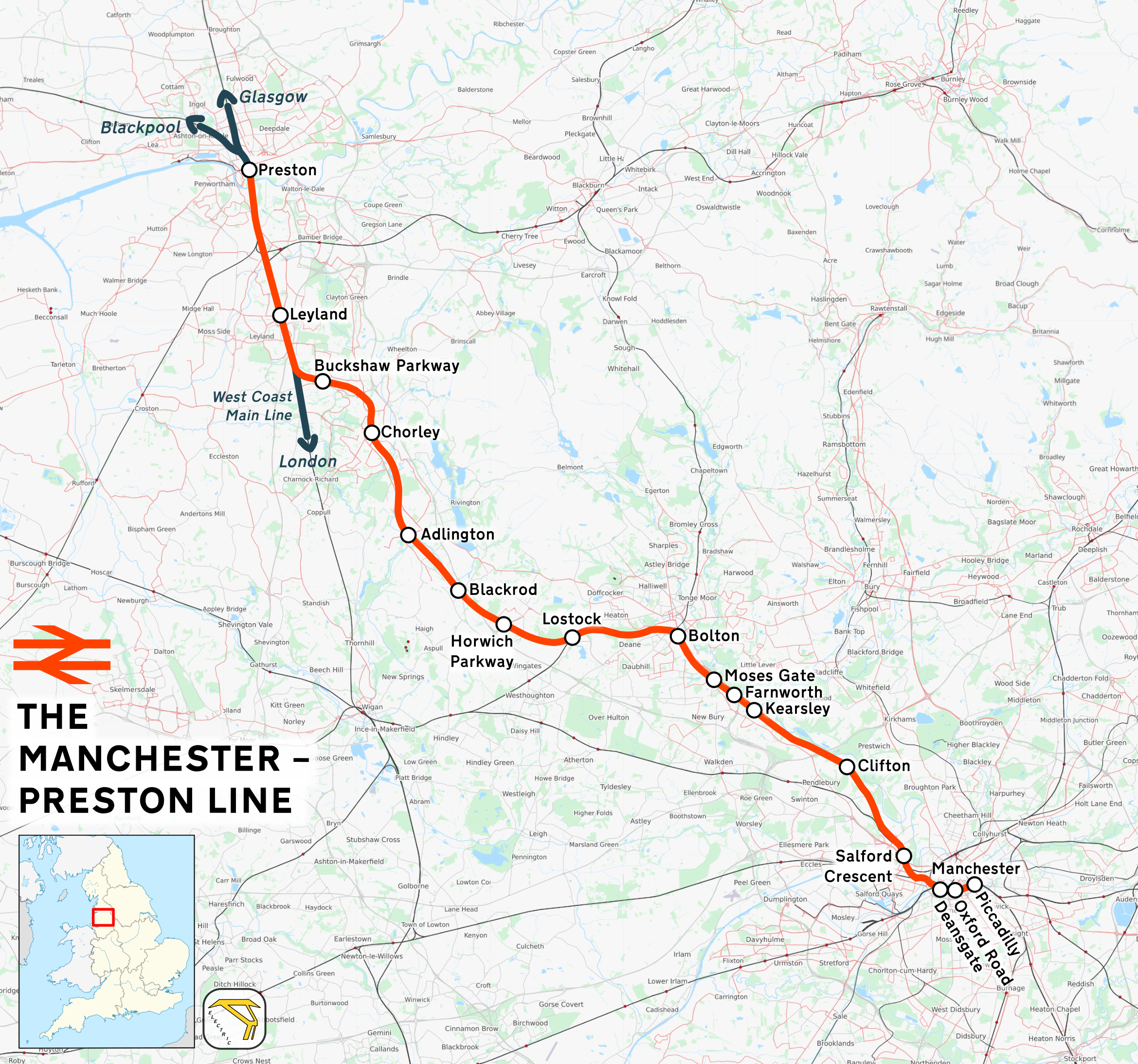
(Click to expand)

The Manchester–Preston line runs from the city of Manchester to Preston, Lancashire, England. It is largely used by commuters entering Manchester from surrounding suburbs and cities, but is also one of the main railway lines in the North West and is utilised by TransPennine Express regional services and to Scotland. It was announced in December 2009 that the line would be electrified, following an announcement in July 2009 that the Chat Moss line between Manchester and Liverpool was to be electrified first. The electrification work for this line commenced in May 2015 and was due for completion in May 2018, but was delayed until December 2018.

Electric service commenced on 11 February 2019.

The line is one of the busiest in the North West, with up to eight trains per hour in each direction between Bolton and Manchester. The line speed is currently 100 mph.

The line operates a wide variety of rolling stock, including class 150, 156, 158, 185 and 195 diesel multiple units, class 323, 331 and 397 electric multiple units and class 769 and 802 bi-mode multiple units. Formerly, the line used to operate class 142, 153, 175 and 180 diesel multiple units and class 319 and 350 electric multiple units. Northern plans to replace most of their older fleet with newer electric, bi-mode and battery-electric trains from 2030.

== History ==
The line was opened as far as Bolton in 1838 by the Manchester and Bolton Railway, then extended in 1841 by the Bolton and Preston Railway. These were amalgamated, via the East Lancashire Railway, as part of the Lancashire and Yorkshire Railway.

== Route ==
The route now has 2 starting points in Manchester:

- Manchester Piccadilly, which offers rail links to most large cities in the country. Trains using the route will call at the through platforms 13 and 14 on the west side of the station. It then follows the route of the Manchester, South Junction and Altrincham Railway as far as Deansgate, where it uses the Windsor link to reach Salford Crescent and joins the line from Manchester Victoria.
- Manchester Victoria was the original starting point before the Windsor Link was created. It goes through Salford Central, after which it then joins the line from the Windsor Link and enters Salford Crescent. Very few direct trains now operate the full route from Manchester Victoria to Preston after the hourly direct service was scrapped in the December 2021 timetable change, with only one southbound train per day on Monday to Saturday evenings and one train northbound on a Sunday morning. Passengers travelling between Preston and Manchester Victoria should change at Bolton or Salford Crescent.

The route then continues to Clifton, which receives a daily parliamentary service of just one train per day in each direction, then passes through Kearsley, Farnworth and Moses Gate following the Irwell Valley for much of the route. The first major town is Bolton. Just after Bolton station there is a junction to the right where the Ribble Valley line, a single track line between Bolton and Hall i’ th’ Wood, heads off to Blackburn and Clitheroe. The line cuts through the western suburbs of Bolton including Lostock, where trains to Wigan Wallgate via Westhoughton branch off. Next is Horwich Parkway opened in 1999 and Blackrod (where the former Horwich Branch diverged). It then crosses the boundary into Lancashire and proceeds through the village of Adlington and on to Chorley, passing through Buckshaw Parkway, the newest station on the line which opened in 2011, and finally joins the West Coast Main Line at Euxton Junction before continuing via Leyland to Preston.

== Operators ==
Northern Trains operate local services over the full length of the line. These include local services from Manchester Airport to Blackpool North (although they run non-stop between Salford Crescent and Bolton) with some trains running non-stop between Horwich Parkway and Chorley, along with semi-fast Manchester Airport to Barrow-in-Furness and Windermere trains. Because of ongoing repair works on the Cumbrian Coast line, some Barrow services continue further north such as to Millom, Sellafield and Corkickle. Other workings use part of the line only - services on the Atherton line between Blackburn and Headbolt Lane diverge at Salford Crescent, services between Rochdale and Blackburn/Clitheroe diverge at Bolton and services between Stalybridge/Manchester Oxford Road and Southport diverge at Lostock Junction.

TransPennine Express (TPE) used to operate the semi-fast Manchester Airport to Blackpool North, Barrow-in-Furness and Windermere services prior to the 2016 franchise change. TPE now only operate express trains to Glasgow Central and Edinburgh Waverley. These were temporarily diverted to run via the Chat Moss and Wigan North Western but resumed in May 2019 after electrification was completed.

Avanti West Coast services occasionally use this line (non-stop) when the West Coast Main Line is closed via Wigan North Western on their main Scotland to London route via Manchester Piccadilly.

Other TOCs operate along the southern section of the route to Ordsall Lane Jn and go on to Warrington:

- Transport for Wales Rail operate services en route to Llandudno via Warrington Bank Quay and Chester.
- East Midlands Railway also operate services between Norwich and Liverpool Lime Street.

== Freight and diversions ==
The line is an important diversionary route at weekends, used in conjunction with the Crewe–Manchester line to divert away from a large section of the West Coast Main Line if required. The convenience is that this only adds 35–40 minutes to a journey and negates the need for costly bus replacement services. Services via the Atherton line use the route via Bolton as a diversionary route during disruption or engineering works. Some freight still uses this line (such as stone trains from the Peak District to a distribution terminal at Hope St., Salford and "Bin-liner" refuse trains from Pendleton to Scunthorpe), especially during the peak periods during the day. It is, however, a primary passenger route in the North West of England.

== Rolling Stock ==
Class 185 trains were the most frequent units on the line, working for First TransPennine Express to Blackpool North, Barrow-in-Furness and Windermere. In the other direction, they all worked to Manchester Airport although engineering works resulted in some services working to Manchester Victoria instead. Some Class 185 sets were also subleased to Arriva Rail North between April 2016 and May 2019 whilst awaiting the delivery of new Class 195 sets. Prior to 2007, Class 175 trains worked the majority of these services before the 185s took over. Between May 2001 and December 2006, they worked all Barrow-in-Furness and Windermere services and the majority of the Blackpool North services. However, they never worked to Scotland due to this being a Virgin CrossCountry service until December 2007.

TransPennine Express use Class 397 Civity units on the line which replaced Class 350/4 units. Class 185 units still appear occasionally when Class 397 units are unavailable; one train per day consisting of a Class 185 unit runs between Manchester Airport and Oxenholme for crew familiarisation.

Northern Trains operate a variety of rolling stock for their services, with Class 331s and Class 323s operating electrified services on the Manchester Airport to Blackpool North route. Class 195 units operate the semi-fast services between Manchester Airport and Barrow/Windermere. On the route south of Bolton, Class 150 and Class 156 diesel multiple units operate on the Ribble Valley line to Blackburn and Clitheroe via Darwen.

Electric services on the Manchester Airport to Blackpool North route use a mix of three-carriage Class 323 and Class 331/0 units, mostly operated in a double formation for additional capacity. Previously, the service was operated by Class 319 units when electric services first started in 2019 until they were gradually replaced by Class 331 units between December 2019 and 2022. Class 323 units cascaded from West Midlands Trains entered service on the route from the December 2024 timetable change, returning off-peak diagrams to six carriages, which were short formed a year before due to rolling stock shortages.

Electrification of the line from Bolton to Wigan North Western was completed in July 2025, operating a mixture of classes 150 and 156 diesel multiple units and Class 769 bi-mode multiple units on services from Stalybridge and Manchester Oxford Road to Southport. Services operated by 769s will switch to diesel power at Ince before continuing toward Southport as the line through Wigan Wallgate is not electrified. Before electrification was completed, trains would change power modes at Bolton.

Northern Trains plan on replacing most of their older rolling stock from 2030, with the withdrawal of older Sprinter trains as well as class 323 and 769 units.

== Electrification ==
Work on 25 kV OHL electrification of the line began in May 2015 and has included numerous bridgeworks plus the major undertaking of the re-boring of Farnworth Tunnel. Its high profile resulted in a visit from Chancellor of the Exchequer, George Osborne, shortly after work started, and from Transport Secretary Patrick McLoughlin in August 2015 during the reboring work. Breakthrough was achieved in late, rather than early October, due to loose sand delaying the work in August; the first trains running through the new twin track bore on Monday 14 December 2015. Electrification of the line was due for completion by December 2016, then delayed until December 2017 and then further delayed until May 2018. In January 2018 yet another delay was announced. This was attributed to difficult ground conditions including hard rock and running sand resulting from old mine workings. Test trains (Virgin Pendolino) finally ran between Preston and Manchester in December 2018. The first scheduled passenger-carrying electric services began on 11 February 2019, running to Blackpool North, Buckshaw Parkway, Manchester Victoria and Manchester Airport using Class 319 EMUs.

The electrification of the line between Lostock Junction and Wigan North Western started in December 2021 but progress was halted following the scheme’s primary contractor entering liquidation in 2023. The first electric test train, a Northern Class 323, ran on the route between Wigan and Bolton on 4 June 2025, electric service started in late July with the power changeover point of Class 769 units on the route being changed from Bolton to Ince.

== See also ==
- Manchester and Bolton Railway
