= Astley Bridge railway station =

Railway station in Greater Manchester, England

Astley Bridge

General information
- Location: Astley Bridge, Greater Manchester; England
- Coordinates: 53.5957°N 2.4317°W

Other information
- Status: Disused

History
- Original company: Lancashire and Yorkshire Railway
- Pre-grouping: Lancashire and Yorkshire Railway

Key dates
- 15 October 1877: Opened
- 1 October 1879: Closed for passengers
- 4 Sept 1961: closed for goods trains
Location
- Location within Greater Manchester

Astley Bridge railway station served the village of Astley Bridge, England, from 1877 to 1879 on the Astley Branch Railway.

== History ==
In 1871, the Lancashire and Yorkshire Railway was authorised to build a branch line from Bolton to Astley Bridge, where it would serve a large business population. It was to leave the Bolton–Blackburn line at a junction on Tonge Viaduct named Astley Bridge Junction, about 74 chains (1.5 km) from the junction at Bolton station. There were to be two stations on the branch, an intermediate goods station at Halliwell and the terminus at Astley Bridge, 1 mile 184 yards (1.778 km) from Astley Bridge Junction. Construction began in 1874, and progress was slow: goods trains began running as far as Halliwell in February 1876; the line was completed in June 1877 but not opened until 15 October 1877. The station opened to passengers that day, and there was a service of nine trains per day in each direction. 83 passengers were carried on the first day, but within two years, many trains carried no passengers at all. As a result, it was a short-lived station, closing to passengers on 1 October 1879. The station remained open for goods, and Astley Bridge became a coal yard until 1961.

| Preceding station | Disused railways | Following station |
|---|---|---|
| Terminus | Lancashire and Yorkshire Railway; Astley Bridge Branch | Halliwell Goods; Line and station closed |
