= Moses Gate railway station =

Railway station in Greater Manchester, England

Coordinates: 53.5563°N 2.4017°W

Moses Gate
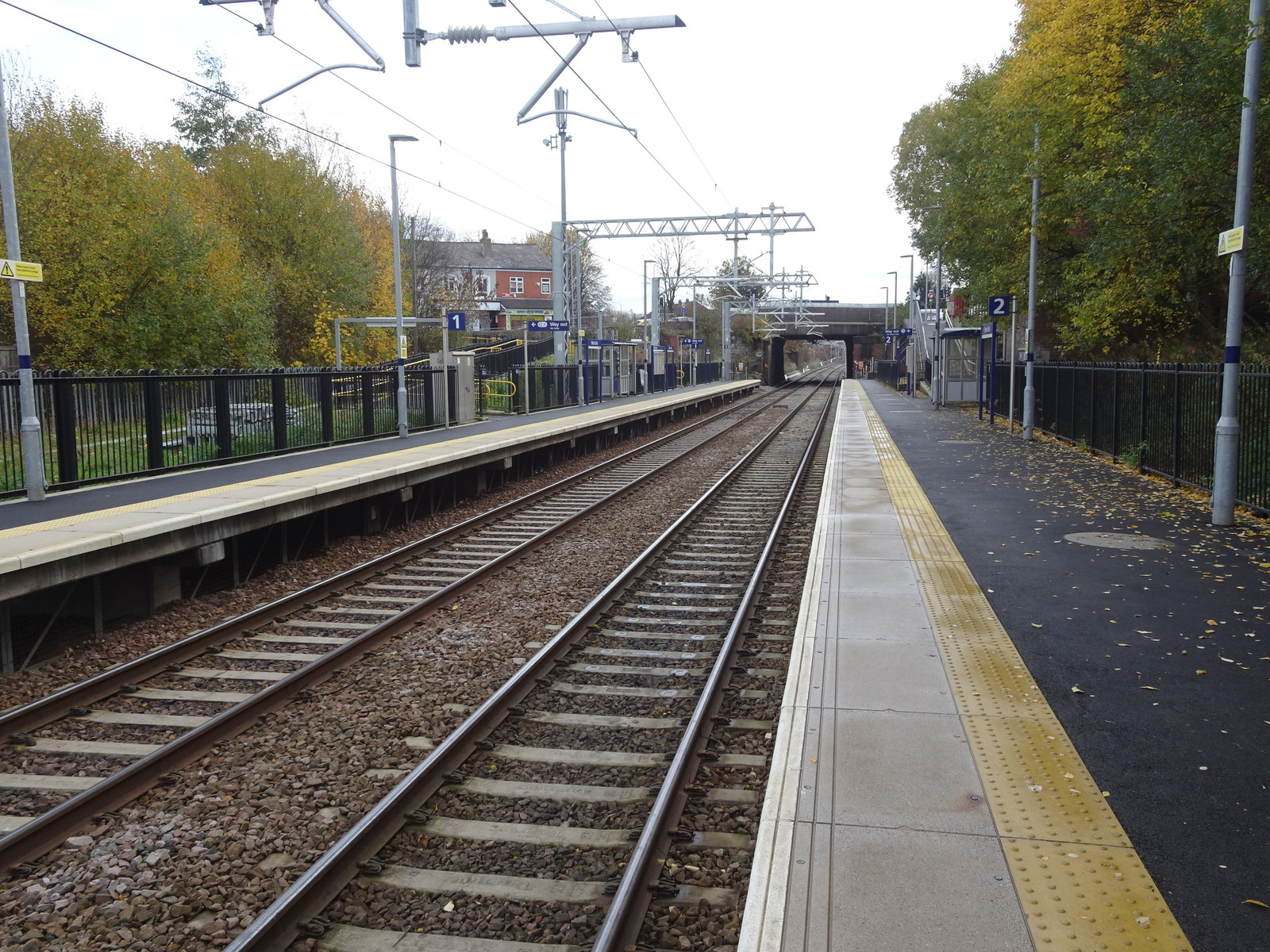
- Moses Gate railway station in 2018, following completion of electrification works.

General information
- Location: Farnworth, Bolton; England
- Grid reference: SD734067
- Manager: Northern
- Transit authority: Transport for Greater Manchester
- Platforms: 2

Other information
- Station code: MSS
- Classification: DfT category F2

Passengers
- 2021/22: ▲31,460
- 2022/23: ▼30,918
- 2023/24: ▲32,468
- 2024/25: ▲36,928
- 2025/26: ▲38,718
Location
Notes
- Passenger statistics from the Office of Rail and Road

Moses Gate railway station serves the Moses Gate suburb of Farnworth in the Metropolitan Borough of Bolton, Greater Manchester, North West England.

It lies on the Manchester-Preston Line 1 1/4 miles (2.0 km) south of Bolton, though only local services run by Northern call here.

Until the late 1970s, Moses Gate was one of the more important stations on the line between Manchester Victoria and Bolton, with Sunday service and high patronage. Due to clearance of much housing in the area, use has since declined (see Strategic Rail Authority figures), although it retains an hourly service (see National Rail Timetable). Moses Gate is the nearest railway station to the village of Little Lever. The station was staffed until the early 1990s, but the station buildings were badly damaged in an arson attack and subsequently demolished. It is now unstaffed, and has no ticketing facilities (passengers intending to travel must buy tickets in advance or on the train). Shelters and timetable posters are located on both platforms. Although there are ramps to each platform, the National Rail Enquiries entry for the station states that it is not currently (December 2016) DDA-compliant.

From early May 2015 until the December 2015 timetable change, services from the station were suspended and replaced by buses due to modernisation work (where the platforms have been rebuilt, ahead of planned electrification of the line), and on the route further south at Farnworth Tunnel. The station reopened on 14th December 2015 following completion of the modernisation work.

== Service ==
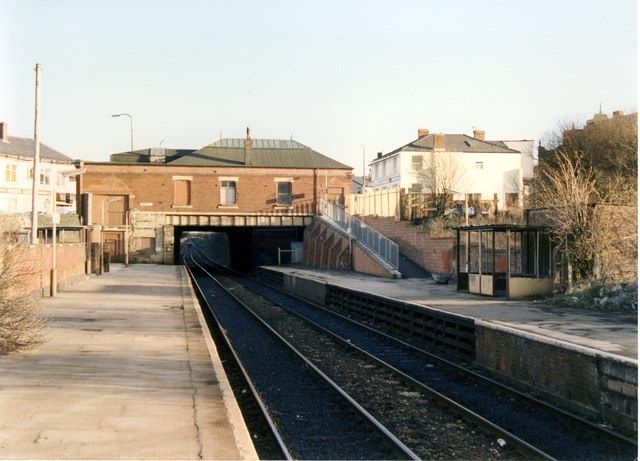
The station in 1989, with some of the original station buildings still intact.

Since the May 2018 timetable change, the service from the station has seen some expansion (notably with the introduction of evening weekday trains for the first time in more than twenty years). A basic hourly service operates in both directions all day (with a few peak extras), southbound to Manchester Victoria and Stalybridge, and northbound to Bolton and Southport via Wigan Wallgate.

Saturday services were suspended and replaced by buses until November 2018 due to the (significantly delayed) work to electrify the route through Bolton.

Services at the station were also temporarily suspended between 28 August and 11 September 2017 due to a damaged road bridge near the station. A fractured water main caused part of the embankment and retaining wall supporting the bridge to collapse onto the track, damaging both the bridge supports and road surface. The line was not in use at the time due to a planned engineering blockade at Bolton - this was due to end on 28 August (and was completed on schedule), but following the incident the railway remained closed between Bolton and Salford Crescent whilst repairs were carried out. Replacement buses were in operation, with through trains diverted via alternative routes. The line reopened on 6 September 2017, though trains were still unable to call at the station as repairs to the access road were still ongoing. Normal operations resumed five days later once these were completed.

There is no Sunday service to the station. The lack of a Sunday service to the station was raised in Parliament in July 2019.

=== Electrification ===
Following delays caused by geological problems and a change of main contractor, electric services eventually commenced on Monday 11 February 2019, utilising Class 319 electric multiple units. No trains of this kind stop at the station, however.

Preceding station	National Rail	Following station
Bolton	Northern Trains; Manchester–Southport line	Farnworth
