= Windsor Link Line, Salford =

Railway line in Salford, England

Coordinates: 53.479445°N 2.270110°W

The Windsor Link Line in green

The Windsor Link is a 700-metre railway line in Salford, Greater Manchester that connects Salford Crescent and Manchester Deansgate stations. It was opened by British Rail in May 1988, and came into full use in 1989. This link allows services from the Manchester–Preston line and the Manchester–Southport line, from the north-west of Manchester (such as from Southport via Wigan Wallgate and Bolton, also from Blackpool North and Lancaster via Preston) to directly access Manchester Piccadilly station: Before the link was opened, services from these lines could only run into Manchester Victoria, although Wigan, Preston or destinations further north could be accessed from Manchester Piccadilly via the West Coast Main Line's connection to the Chat Moss route; the northern route of the Liverpool-Manchester lines, although this route is less direct. Services then continue south east to and from Piccadilly to destinations such as Manchester Airport, Buxton, Hazel Grove and Chester. Government approval for the link was granted in 1985, and it was built for £12.5 million (equivalent to £38.7 million in 2025)

The link has its west end just south of Salford Crescent station where it forms Windsor Bridge Junction (hence the name) and ends half a mile later at a junction with the route of the Liverpool and Manchester Railway at Ordsall Lane Junction, just to the west of the former Ordsall Lane station. Trains using the link then run along that route for a very short distance before turning off onto the route of the Manchester, South Junction and Altrincham Railway to reach Deansgate, Manchester Oxford Road and Piccadilly.

As part of the electrification of the line between Manchester and Preston, the link was electrified in December 2018.

== See also ==
- Ordsall Chord
