= Salford Central railway station =

Railway station in Greater Manchester, England

Salford Central
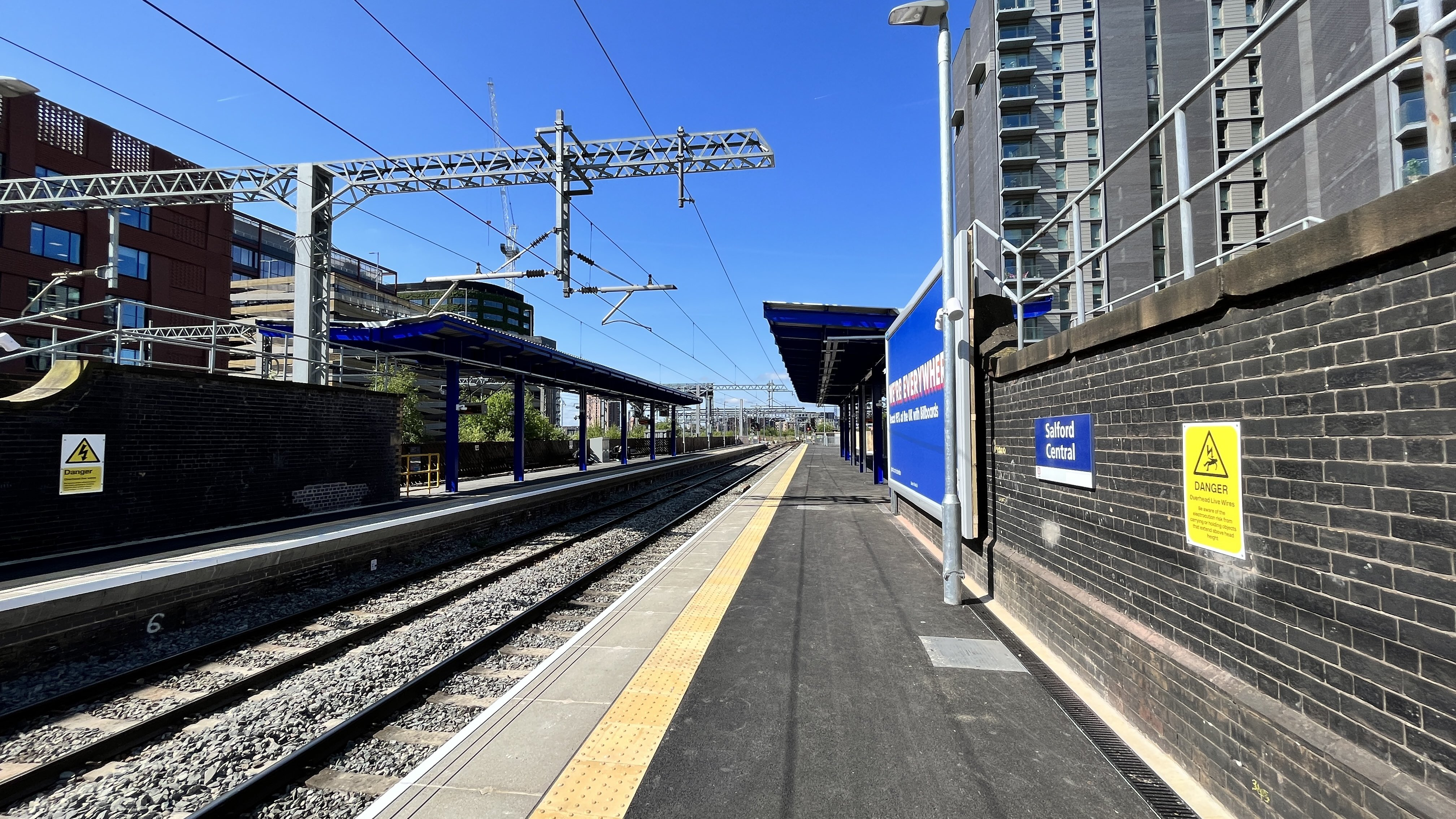
- The station platforms in June 2023 after refurbishment

General information
- Location: Salford, City of Salford; England
- Coordinates: 53°28′58″N 2°15′21″W
- Grid reference: SJ831984
- Manager: Northern Trains
- Transit authority: Transport for Greater Manchester
- Platforms: 2

Other information
- Station code: SFD
- Classification: DfT category E

History
- Original company: Manchester, Bolton and Bury Railway
- Pre-grouping: Lancashire and Yorkshire Railway
- Post-grouping: London, Midland and Scottish Railway

Key dates
- 29 May 1838: Opened as Salford
- April 1858: Renamed Salford (New Bailey Street)
- August 1865: Renamed Salford
- 3 October 1988: Renamed Salford Central
- 2 January 2023: Service suspended
- 4 June 2023: Service resumed

Passengers
- 2021/22: ▲0.464 million
- 2022/23: ▲0.527 million
- 2023/24: ▲0.615 million
- 2024/25: ▲0.815 million
- 2025/26: ▲1.026 million
Location
Notes
- Passenger statistics from the Office of Rail and Road

Salford Central railway station is in the city of Salford, Greater Manchester, England, close to Spinningfields and Deansgate. It is served by trains to and from Manchester Victoria, towards Rochdale and Wigan Wallgate.

== History ==
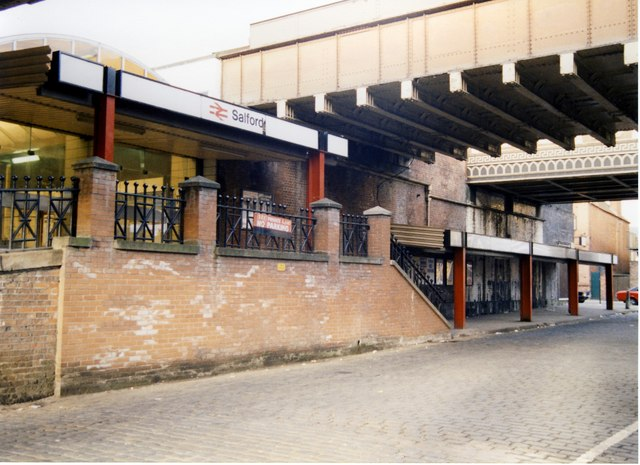
The station as it appeared in 1989

The railway station opened on 29 May 1838 as a terminus on the Manchester and Bolton Railway and was originally named Salford railway station. In 1843, a connection to Manchester Victoria was built, carried on iron columns. The roof suffered from corrosion caused by the sulphurous emissions of locomotives passing through the station and one was replaced after only four years. Between April 1858 and August 1865, to avoid confusion with Salford (Oldfield Road), the station was named Salford (New Bailey Street), after which it reverted to its original name of Salford.

To avoid confusion with the newly built Salford Crescent station, in 1988 it was renamed Salford Central. and two platforms fell out of use. For many years the station was served at peak times only.

Graffiti mural on Platform 1, 2018

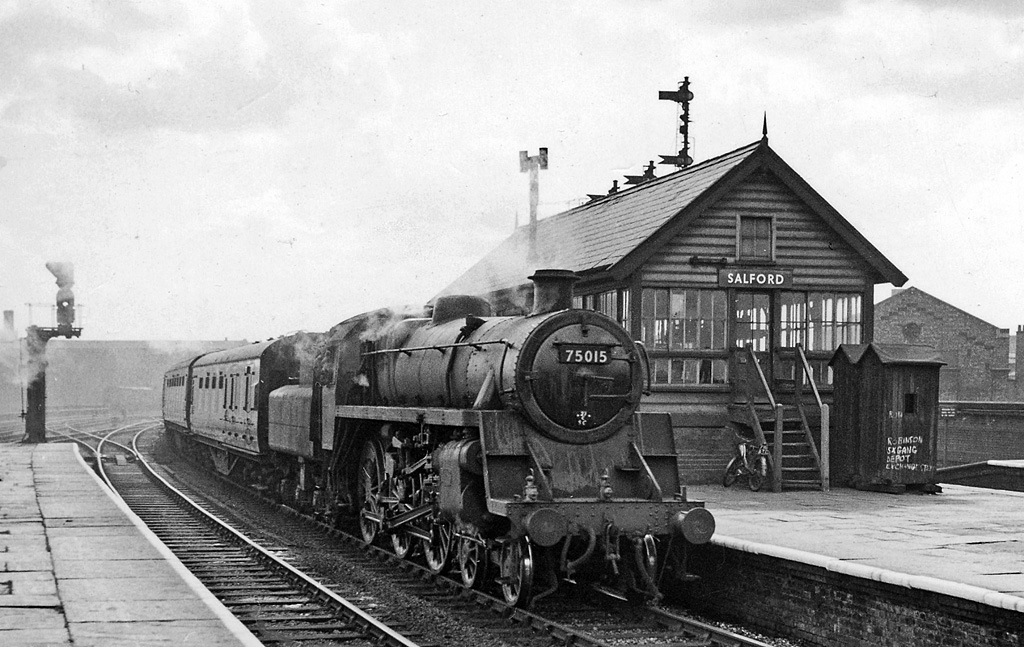
Eastbound ECS entering the station in 1959

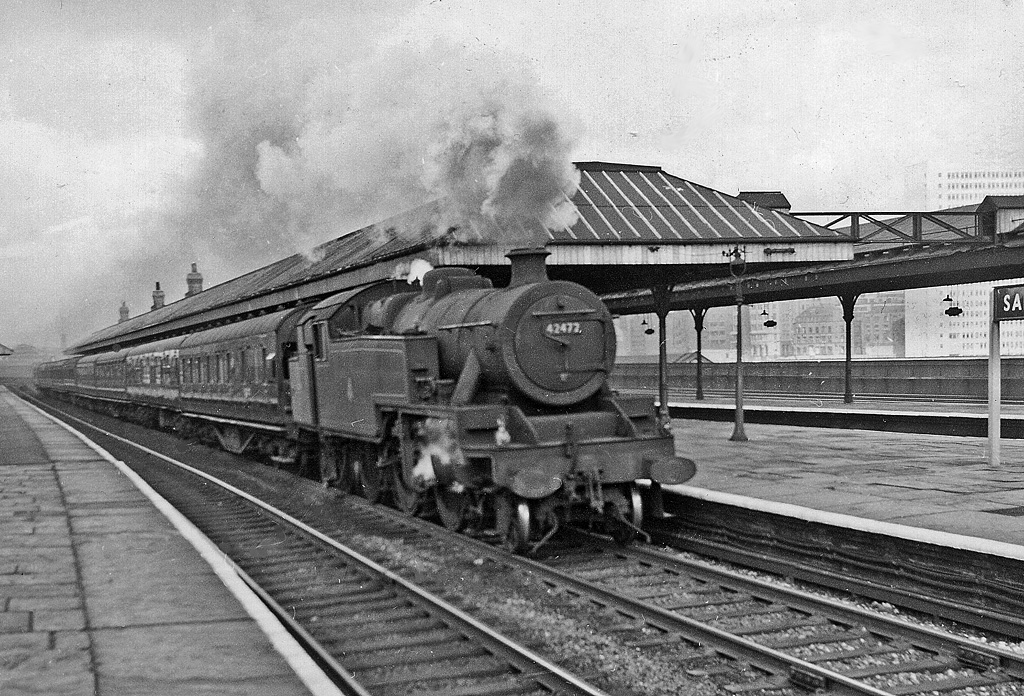
Down local train passing through the station in 1959

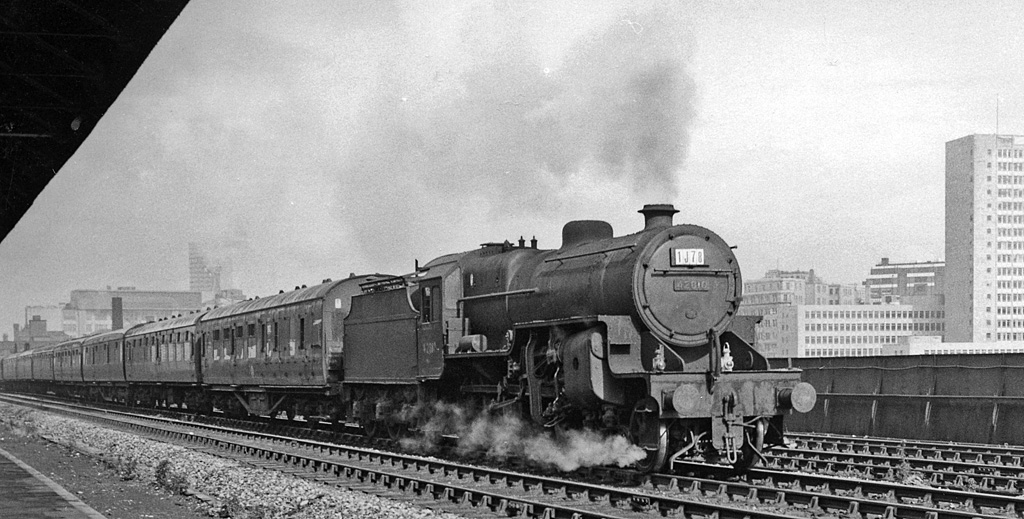
Westbound empty stock train passing Salford Station in 1963

In the 2000s GMPTE commissioned a refurbishment designed by Austin-Smith:Lord involving a new glazed foyer at street level and step-free access from street to platforms, however ramped access to the trains came in a subsequent renovation in 2023.

== Location ==
Manchester city centre is accessible either on foot or by a short ride on public transport. Salford is also served by Salford Crescent railway station, close to the University of Salford and Salford Precinct. The £700m Middlewood Locks development will be served by Salford Central.

== Facilities ==
The ticket office is staffed from 06:25 to 19:35, six days per week (closed late evenings and on Sundays, so tickets must be purchased on the train at these times). The ticket hall is connected to the platforms via inclined ramps that are suitable for mobility-impaired users. There are shelters and snack/drink vending machines at platform level, along with timetable posters, digital display screens and automated announcements to provide train running information.

== Services ==
The station has a frequent service on weekdays and Saturdays (typically 5 tph each way), with all trains to and from Victoria calling here. Destinations served include Wigan Wallgate and Headbolt Lane (via Atherton) and Southport, Blackburn and Clitheroe (via Bolton) westbound, Leeds and Blackburn (via Todmorden), Rochdale and Stalybridge eastbound (some services also terminate at Victoria).

The station was formerly closed on Sundays, but since the summer 2018 timetable change was introduced on 20 May all trains between Salford Crescent and Victoria now call here.

Services were suspended from this station on 2 January 2023 until Summer 2023 so Network Rail could carry out improvement works, raising the canopies and platforms due to accessibility issues, as well as upgrading the track and the signalling system.

== Future development ==
A Network Rail report suggests building platforms on the line to Liverpool (via Newton-le-Willows), the lines of which run through the station but are not provided with platforms. This scheme has since been adopted by Transport for Greater Manchester and included in their Capital Works Programme for 2015–16 to 2020–21. This will see an additional platform built and the old platforms 3 & 4 reopened, at a cost of £20.5 million and will allow Liverpool, Chester & Manchester Airport-bound trains (using the Ordsall Chord) to call here.

All lines through the station have now been electrified and electric working on the Preston via Bolton route commenced on Monday 11 February 2019 utilising Class 319 Electric Multiple Units.

Preceding station	National Rail	Following station
Salford Crescent	Northern Trains; Manchester–Preston line	Manchester Victoria
Salford Crescent	Northern Trains; Ribble Valley line	Manchester Victoria
Salford Crescent	Northern Trains; Manchester–Southport line	Manchester Victoria
Salford Crescent	Northern Trains; Manchester–Headbolt Lane; Mondays-Saturdays only	Manchester Victoria
	Future services	
Deansgate	Northern Trains; Ordsall Chord	Manchester Victoria
Eccles	Northern Trains; Liverpool–Manchester line	Manchester Victoria
	Historical railways	
Oldfield Road; Line open, station closed	Lancashire and Yorkshire Railway; Manchester and Bolton Railway	Manchester Victoria; Line and station open
