= Manchester and Bolton Railway =

Railway in Lancashire, England

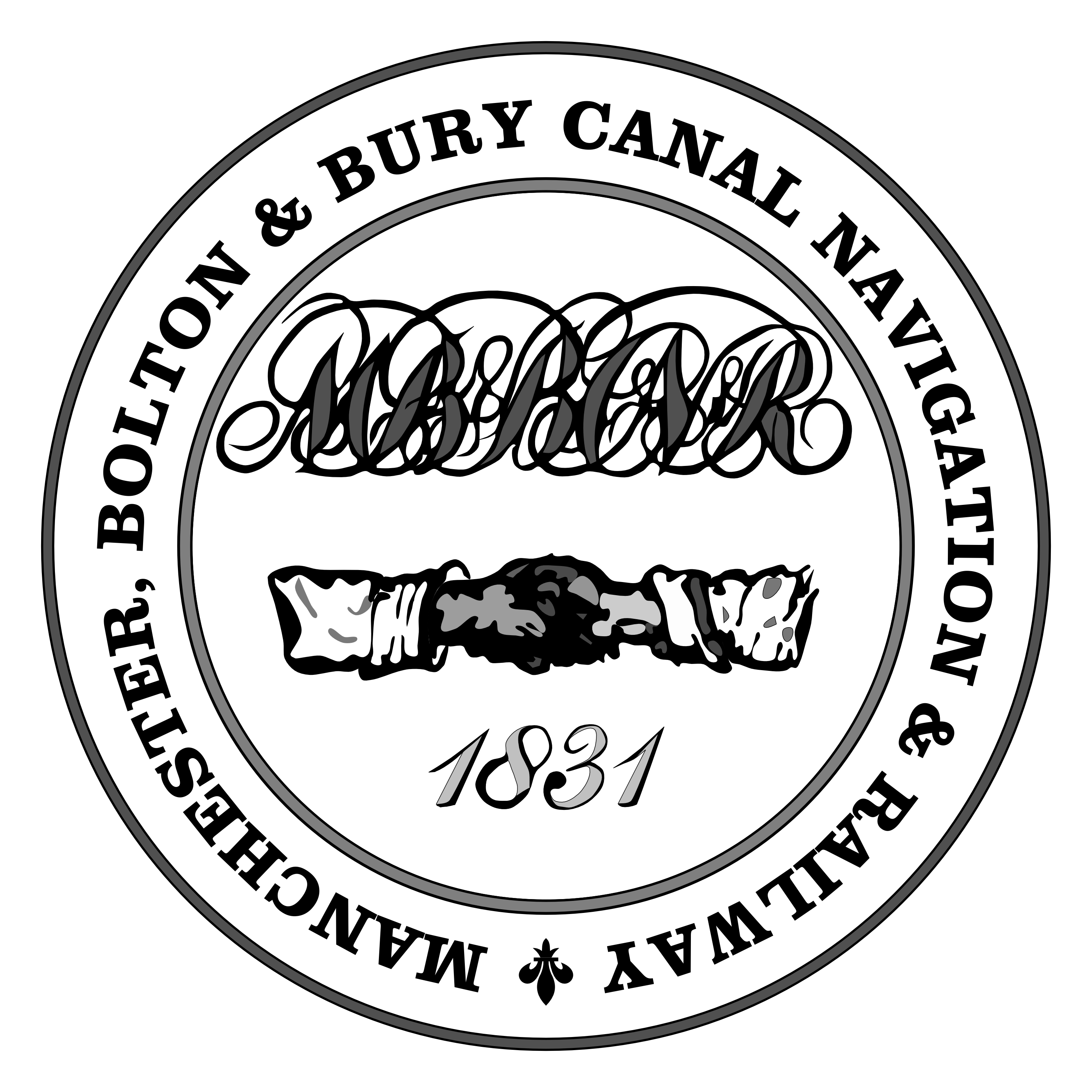
- Industry: Railway company
- Founded: 23 August 1831
- Defunct: 1846
- Fate: Amalgamation
- Successor: Manchester and Leeds Railway
- Headquarters: 28 New Bailey St & 10 Bolton St, Salford
- Key people: Jesse Hartley (engineer)

The Manchester and Bolton Railway was a railway in the historic county of Lancashire, England, connecting Salford to Bolton. It was built by the proprietors of the Manchester, Bolton and Bury Canal Navigation and Railway Company who had in 1831 converted from a canal company. The 10-mile (16 km) long railway was originally to have been built upon most of the line of the canal, but it was eventually built alongside the Salford and Bolton arms of the canal. The act of Parliament, the Manchester, Bolton and Bury Canal and Railway Act 1831 (1 & 2 Will. 4. c. lx), also allowed the construction of a connection to Bury, but technical constraints meant that it was never built.

The railway required significant earthworks, including a 295-yard (270 m) tunnel. The railway termini were at Salford railway station and Trinity Street station in Bolton. The railway was opened in 1838 to passenger and freight services. In 1841 it was extended to Preston, and in 1844 to Victoria railway station in Manchester. It amalgamated with the Manchester and Leeds Railway in 1846.

The railway is in use today as part of the Manchester to Preston Line, although some of the original stations are no longer in use.

== History ==
=== Background ===
In the 1820s a number of proposals for a railway between Manchester and Bolton were made, some well advanced enough to be submitted to Parliament. One, in 1825, was for a line from New Bailey in Salford, to Park Field in Bolton, and included a branch line to the Mersey and Irwell Navigation. The plan included the use of an inclined plane at Clifton to allow the railway to access the higher ground from thereon. Another scheme was to connect with the planned Liverpool and Manchester Railway near Eccles, and would reach Bolton via Moorside and Farnworth. Neither of these schemes progressed beyond the early stages of planning. In 1830 two more proposals to connect the towns were made. The Manchester to Preston Railway was unsuccessful, leaving open the way for the second scheme, which would become known as the Manchester and Bolton Railway.

=== Manchester, Bolton and Bury Canal Company ===
Manchester, Bolton and Bury Canal and Railway Act 1831
- Act of Parliament
- Parliament of the United Kingdom
- Long title: An Act to enable the Company of Proprietors of the Canal Navigation from Manchester to Bolton and to Bury to make and maintain a Railway from Manchester to Bolton and to Bury in the County Palatine of Lancaster, upon or near the Line of the said Canal Navigation, and to make and maintain a Collateral Branch to communicate therewith.
- Citation: 1 & 2 Will. 4. c. lx
- Territorial extent: United Kingdom

Dates
- Royal assent: 23 August 1831
- Commencement: 23 August 1831 (Note: The Acts of Parliament (Commencement) Act 1793.)

Other legislation
- Repeals/revokes: Manchester, Bolton and Bury Canal Act 1791

Text of statute as originally enacted

Manchester, Bolton and Bury Canal and Railway Act 1832
- Act of Parliament
- Parliament of the United Kingdom
- Long title: An Act to enable the Company of Proprietors of the Manchester, Bolton, and Bury Canal Navigation and Railway to alter some Parts of the said Canal Navigation, to alter and amend the Line of the said Railway, to make further collateral Branches thereto; and for amending the Powers and Provisions of the Act relating to the said Canal and Railway.
- Citation: 2 & 3 Will. 4. c. lxix

Dates
- Royal assent: 1 June 1832

Text of statute as originally enacted

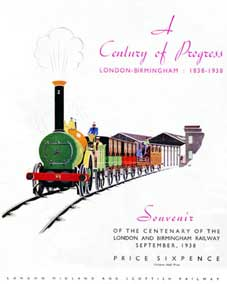
London and Birmingham Railway Centenary, 1938 souvenir illustrating the 2-2-0 locomotive of Edward Bury.

In 1830 the Manchester, Bolton and Bury Canal Company, led by chairman John Tobin, began to promote the construction of a railway along the line of their canal, from Salford to Bolton and Bury. Alexander Nimmo was employed to assess the proposal, and reported that it was possible "so far as he expressed himself capable of judging from his present cursory view of the canal". The shareholders then sought a bill for a railway from Bolton to Manchester and on 23 August 1831 obtained an act of Parliament, the Manchester, Bolton and Bury Canal and Railway Act 1831 (1 & 2 Will. 4. c. lx) to become the "Company of Proprietors of the Manchester, Bolton and Bury Canal Navigation and Railway Company". The act authorised the abandonment of the canal between the Irwell basin and Prestolee, and empowered the company to build a line from Manchester to Bolton and Bury, "upon or near the line of ... the Canal". Two branch lines were also authorised, one from Clifton Aqueduct through to Great Lever, and the other from Giants Seat through to Radcliffe and Bury. Due mainly to the objections of local mine owners who would have lost access to the canal and therefore their supply route, and who also would not have had branch railways built for them, the company agreed to an amending bill which would keep the canal and allow the new railway to be constructed alongside it. The company obtained a further act of Parliament, the Manchester, Bolton and Bury Canal and Railway Act 1832 (2 & 3 Will. 4. c. lxix) that allowed it to build the railway along the new alignment. The act also allowed for an extension of the railway to New Bailey Street in Salford, and from Church Wharf (the terminus of the canal at Bolton) to Bridge Street. Smaller branches in Bolton and Salford were also allowed.

Manchester, Bolton and Bury Canal and Railway Act 1835
- Act of Parliament
- Parliament of the United Kingdom
- Long title: An Act to amend the Acts relating to the Manchester, Bolton, and Bury Canal Navigation and Railway, and to make a Branch Railway to Bolton.
- Citation: 5 & 6 Will. 4. c. xxx

Dates
- Royal assent: 17 June 1835

Text of statute as originally enacted

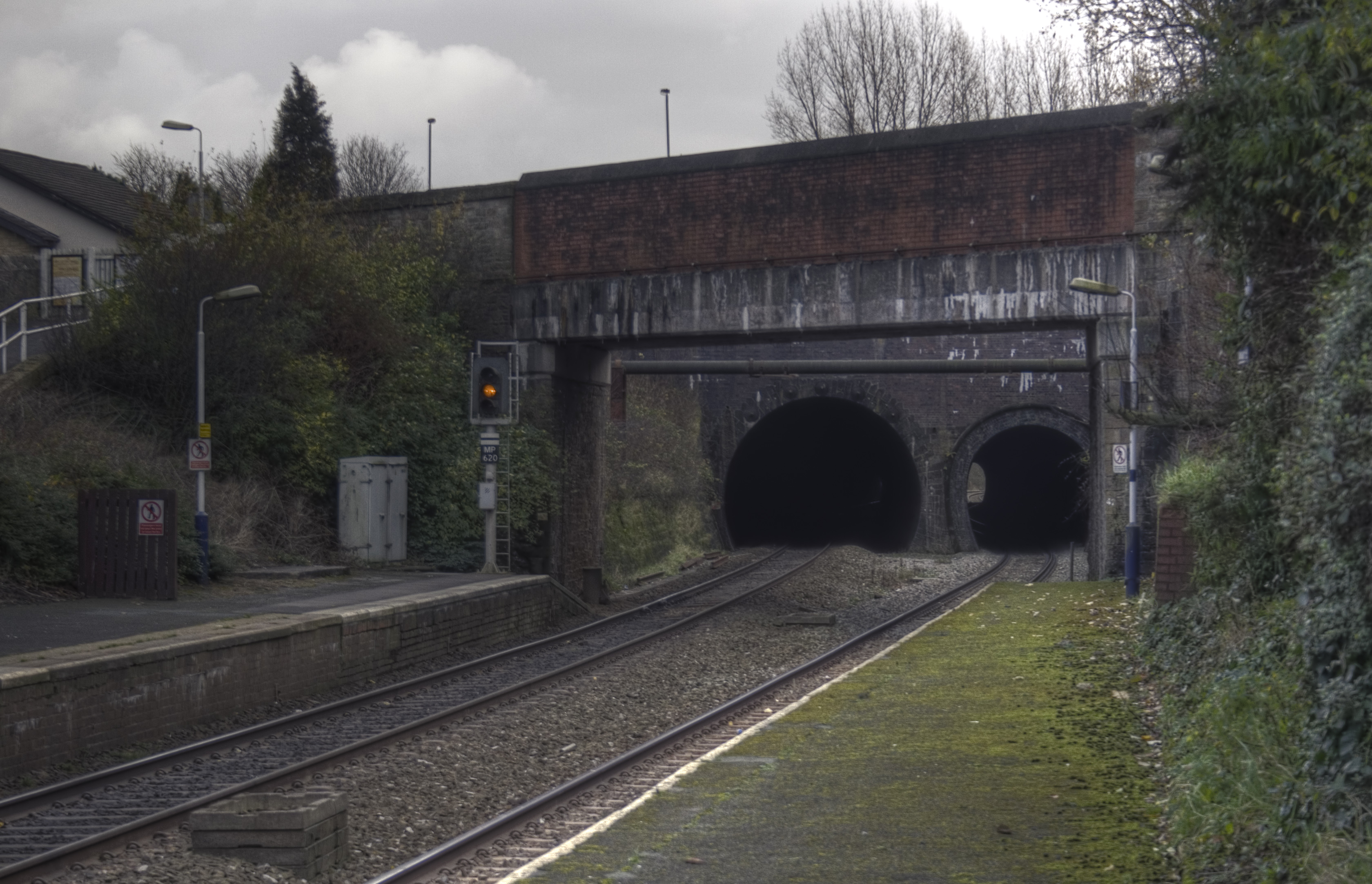
The two differently-sized tunnels at Farnworth.

Construction of the railway started in 1833, from Salford. The company attempted to alter the route of the Bury branch, and also to extend it to Rawtenstall, but they did not receive parliamentary approval for this. In July 1834 the committee of management applied to Parliament for "an act to amend the line of the railway between Manchester and Bolton". The amendment would take the railway along much the same course as that proposed by the Manchester to Preston Railway and was authorised by the Manchester, Bolton and Bury Canal and Railway Act 1835 (5 & 6 Will. 4. c. xxx). Work proceeded so slowly that further clauses were added to the proposed act, including a continuation of the railway from Bolton, to Liverpool. Although this continuation was never built, the Liverpool and Bury Railway built such a connection in 1848. A line from Clifton to Bolton, authorised in 1835, did not materialise. The connection to Bury was never built, due mainly to the objections of the company's engineer, Jesse Hartley. The Bury branch would have required a 1,100-yard (1,000 m) tunnel on a gradient of 1 in 100, at the time a difficult and expensive proposition.

Initially there were to have been three tracks, one for goods and another two for passengers, but only two were built. Work proceeded at a slow pace, in a piecemeal fashion, with contracts awarded for portions of the work as occasion demanded. Advertisements in the Bolton Chronicle appealed to quarrymen for quantities of stone blocks to support the rails, and for excavators to construct parts of a proposed addition to the embankment from Agecroft towards Clifton Hall. Another advertisement in November that year advertised for tenders for contracts for the construction of bridges, viaducts, culverts and other structures to finish the line from Irwell Street in Salford, to Bolton. A difficult section of the railway was at Farnworth, where a tunnel was required to cut through the hillside. A double-bore tunnel 295 yards (270 m) long was built between 1835 and 1838, driven from both sides, with a large vertical shaft in the centre. This was later joined by a narrower single-bore tunnel, through which the down line was routed. Traffic along the upline was routed through the original tunnel.

Manchester, Bolton and Bury Canal, Navigation and Railway Act 1838
- Act of Parliament
- Parliament of the United Kingdom
- Long title: An Act for enabling the Company of Proprietors of the Manchester, Bolton, and Bury Canal Navigation and Railway to raise more Money; and for amending the Powers and Provisions of the several Acts relating thereto.
- Citation: 1 & 2 Vict. c. xxv

Dates
- Royal assent: 11 June 1838

Text of statute as originally enacted

Four acts of Parliament were required to raise the necessary funds, and the line opened on 28 May 1838. From a report of the directors on 9 January 1839, the railway had carried 228,799 passengers since its inception. In 1841 the company had 10 locomotive engines.

In 1845 William Hurst took over as Railway Superintendent for the company.

A branch line was also "to join and communicate with the ... Bolton and Leigh Railway", at a junction near the Daubhill Stationary Engine, this line was however, not built. The company later shared their railway, including their station at Salford, with the Manchester, Bury and Rossendale Railway Company (MB&RRC) and both worked together to construct a junction at Clifton Junction railway station. In 1846 the company was taken over by the Manchester and Leeds Railway, under the Manchester and Leeds Railway (Manchester, Bolton and Bury Canal and Railway) Act 1846 (9 & 10 Vict. c. ccclxxviii), which itself became the Lancashire and Yorkshire Railway the following year. In 1922 it amalgamated into the London and North Western Railway, and in 1923 this company amalgamated into the London, Midland and Scottish Railway. This company was nationalised in 1948 under the Transport Act 1947, and became part of British Railways.

== Route ==
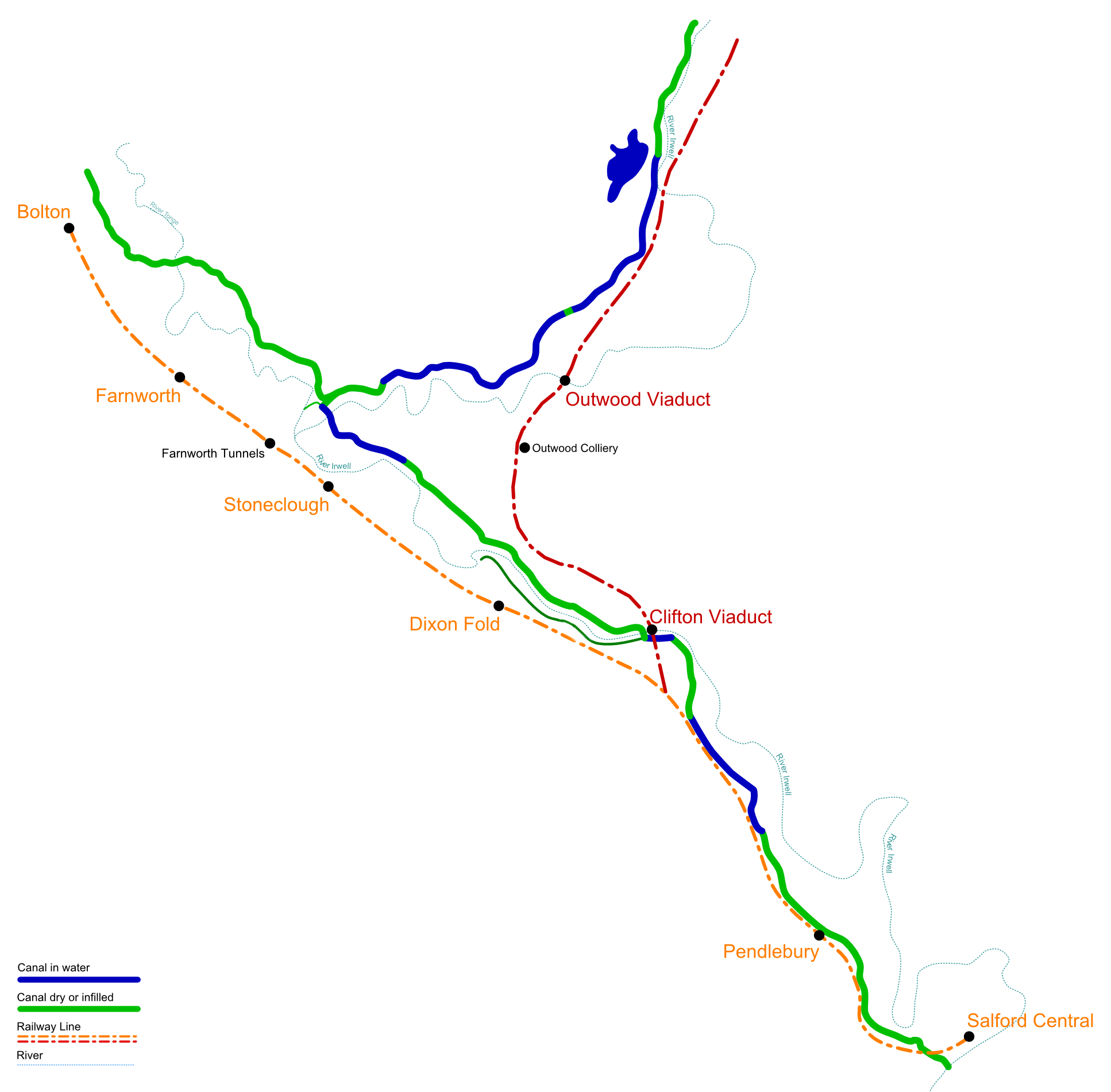
A map of the railway and the later Manchester Bury and Rossendale line, including the canal

The original terminus was at Salford railway station on New Bailey Street in Salford. Passing through Pendleton, Clifton Junction, Dixon Fold, Stoneclough and Farnworth the line ended at Bolton railway station. In 1841 the line was extended to Preston by the Bolton and Preston Railway. The route northwards to Blackburn followed four years later, whilst the Liverpool and Bury Railway's arrival in 1848 gave Bolton links eastward to Bury and Rochdale and westwards to Wigan and Liverpool. From Salford, the line was extended 1,290 yards (1,180 m) via several bridges and across Chapel Street, to Victoria Station in 1844. These lines had all become part of the expanding Lancashire and Yorkshire Railway system by 1858.

== Design ==
The rails were of broad-based parallel form and weighed 55 pounds per yard (27 kg/m). Gauge was 4 ft 8 in (1,420 mm). These rails were later replaced with 68 pounds per yard (34 kg/m) rails when the former were discovered to be insufficient to carry the weight of the trains using them. Significant earthworks were required along the route, and the 295-yard (270 m) tunnel at Farnworth was constructed in favour of a cutting. The tunnels were built through clay, and lined entirely with brick or masonry. Turntables were placed at each terminus.

Thirty three bridges were constructed, along with stone drainage facilities to keep water from the cuttings. The railway company was forced to change the design of some of these bridges, as insufficient room was given for the locomotives and carriages on the track to pass between the bridge supports, which were only 10 feet (3.0 m) wide. With only 12 inches (30 cm) of space between some vehicles and the bridge supports, a report by the Inspector of Railways on 11 December 1846 concluded that they were dangerous. On 19 November 1842 a guard named William Parker was killed on the railway, his skull found fractured, and on 26 July 1844 a guard named James Cook was killed as he leant out and was struck by a support. It was also reported that the distance between rails at these bridges was only 4 feet (1.2 m), whereas the normal distance was 6 feet (1.8 m).

== Locomotive types and coaches ==
The company purchased four Bury Type locomotives from Bury, Curtis and Kennedy, two from George Forrester and Company, and two from William Fairbairn & Sons. Two further Bury 2-2-0s were acquired by the railway in 1844–45. Coaches were first and second class; each first class carriage held 18 passengers, and each second class carriage held 32 passengers. Third class carriages were introduced on 11 June 1838 but discontinued on 1 December 1838 after the company found that many passengers were vacating first and second class, for the cheaper third class. The company had 15 first class carriages, and 22 second class carriages.

The locomotive works of the Manchester and Bolton Railway (M&BR) was at Salford, on the south side of the line within a roughly triangular area bounded by the railway, the Manchester, Bolton and Bury Canal, and East Ordsall Lane (grid reference SJ826982). Opened with the railway in 1839, Salford works maintained the locomotives of the M&BR, and after the amalgamation of the M&BR with the Manchester and Leeds Railway (M&LR) in 1846, continued to maintain the locomotives of the Bolton section of the M&LR (subsequently of the Lancashire and Yorkshire Railway (LYR)) until at least 3 October 1849 when the two locomotive departments of the LYR were combined. Locomotive maintenance was transferred to the Miles Platting works of the LYR, and the Salford buildings were demolished before 1865.

The first locomotive superintendent of the M&BR was William Jenkins, appointed in May 1839. He resigned in early February 1845 to take up a similar position with the M&LR at their Miles Platting works, which was then under construction. His successor on the M&BR was William Hurst, and on 3 October 1849, Hurst became the 'outdoor locomotive superintendent' of the LYR, alongside Jenkins who was now 'indoor locomotive superintendent'.

== Fares and services ==
Initially, first class passenger fares were two shillings and six pence (2s 6d - "half-a-crown") for the entire ten mile journey, or 3d per mile. This is the equivalent of at least £10 in 2011 values. Second class was 2s, or 2.40d per mile. On 11 June 1838, a new pricing structure was introduced, with first class costing 2s, second class 1s 6d, and third class 1s. Passenger tickets were taken in transit.

Freight was charged at a maximum rate of 4.02d, and a minimum of 3d per ton per mile.

The first train to use the new line was pulled by the Victoria. It left Manchester at 8:00 am, and arrived in Bolton 26 minutes 30 seconds later. The second train was pulled by the Fairfield. The trains originally ran on the right hand set of rails, an unusual practice in England, however the railway later changed to left-hand running with the connection of the MB&RRC at Clifton. Ten trains ran in each direction per weekday, and two on Sundays. The journey from Salford to Bolton took about 35 minutes.

== See also ==
- Manchester to Preston Line
