= Bolton Interchange =

Railway and bus station in Greater Manchester, England

Bolton
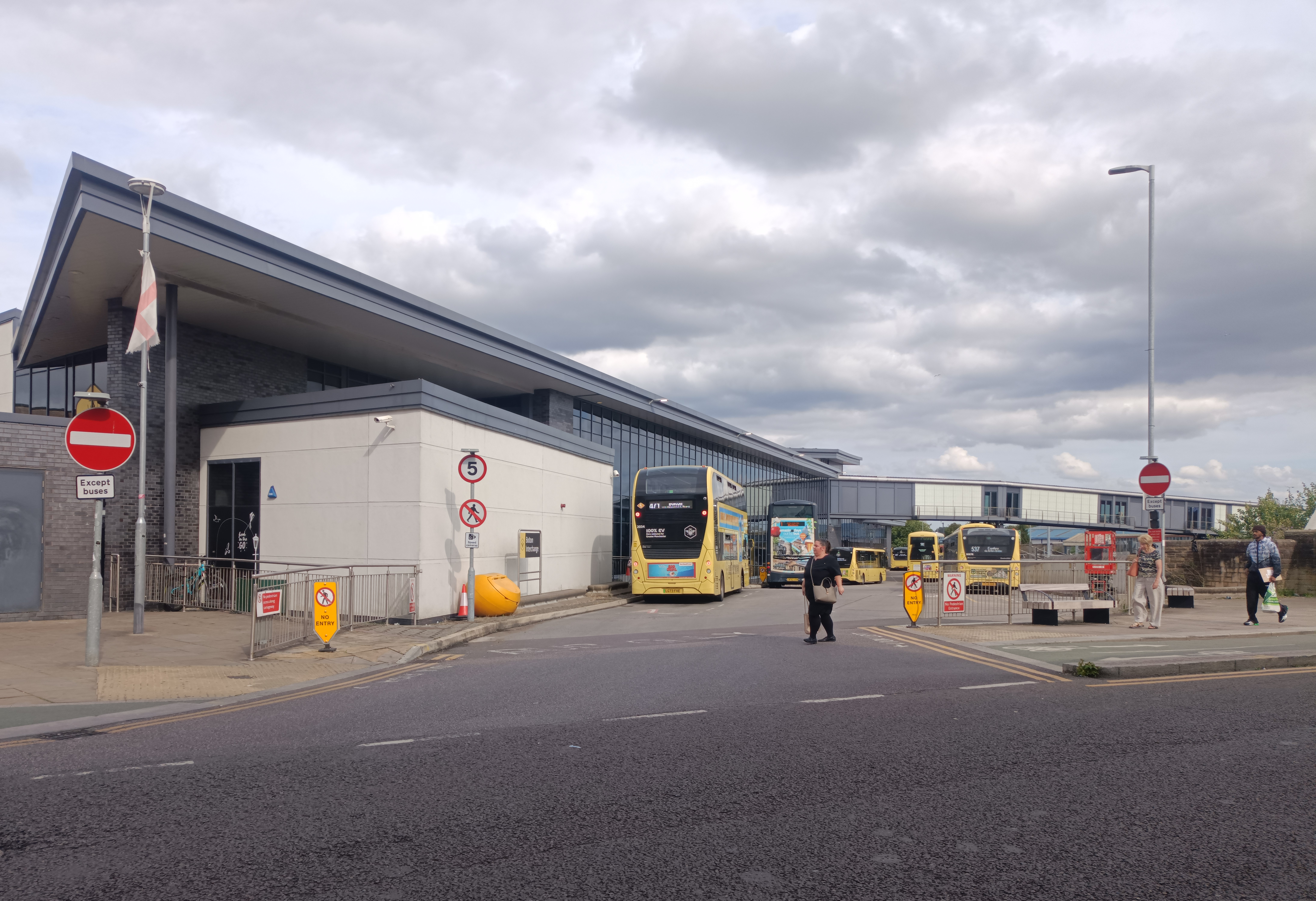

General information
- Location: Bolton, Metropolitan Borough of Bolton, England
- Coordinates: 53.573°N 2.425°W
- Grid reference: SD719086
- Manager: Northern Trains
- Platforms: 5
- Train operators: Northern Trains; TransPennine Express

Other information
- Station code: BON
- Classification: DfT category C1

History
- Opened: 1838

Passengers
- 2020/21: ▼0.866 million
- Interchange: ▼91,085
- 2021/22: ▲2.344 million
- Interchange: ▲0.264 million
- 2022/23: ▲2.499 million
- Interchange: ▲0.423 million
- 2023/24: ▲2.712 million
- Interchange: ▼0.399 million
- 2024/25: ▲3.012 million
- Interchange: ▲0.495 million
Location
Notes
- Passenger statistics from the Office of Rail and Road

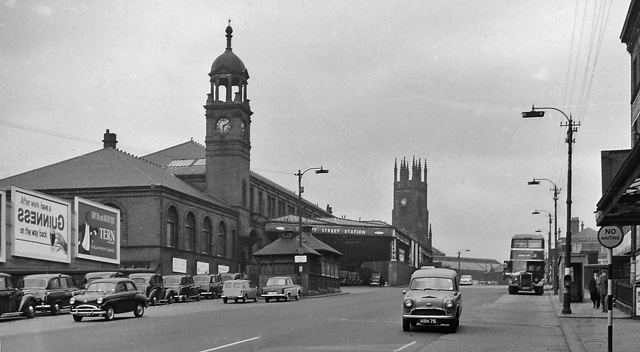
The former station buildings (demolished in the 1980s), seen from the Bradshawgate end of Trinity Street

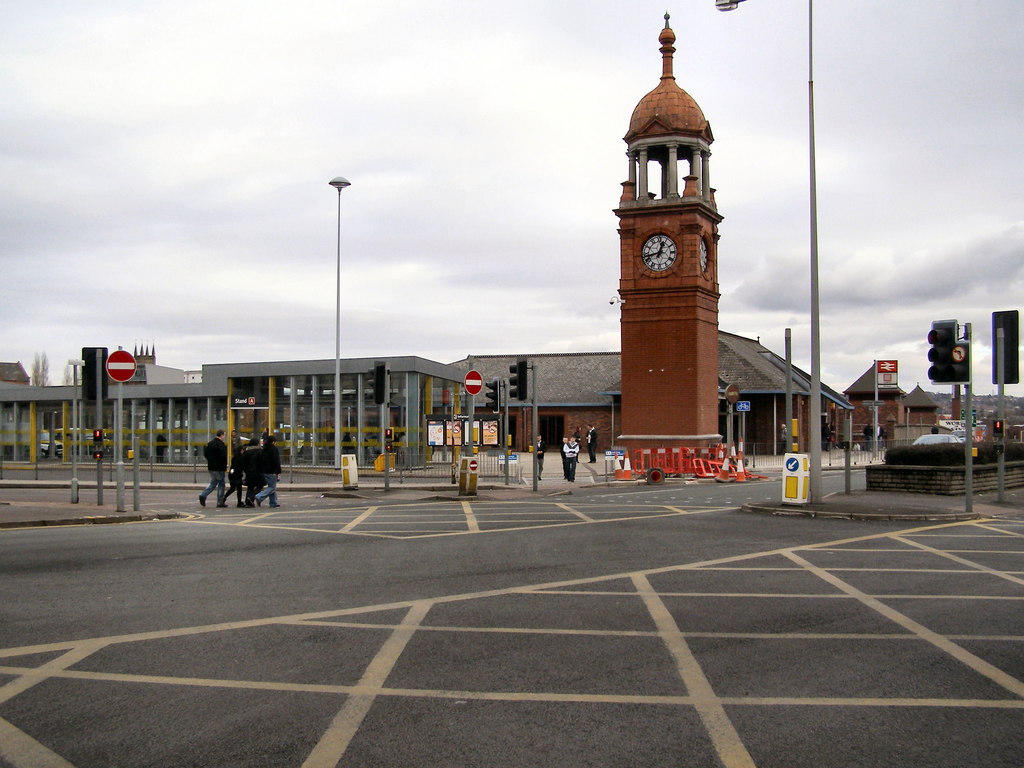
The bus station before refurbishment in 2010

Bolton Interchange is a transport interchange combining Bolton railway station and Bolton bus station in the town of Bolton, in Greater Manchester, England. It is a stop on the Manchester to Preston and Ribble Valley lines; it lies 11 1/4 miles (18.1 km) north-west of Manchester Piccadilly. The station is managed by Northern Trains, which operates services along with TransPennine Express.

The railway station was originally named Bolton Trinity Street to differentiate it from nearby Bolton Great Moor Street station, which closed in 1954. The station was also previously known as Bridgeman Street and Bradford Square.

There are frequent local and semi-fast services to Manchester Victoria, Manchester Oxford Road, Manchester Piccadilly, Clitheroe, Blackburn, Wigan Wallgate, Blackpool North and Barrow-in-Furness. Services operating to Victoria and Piccadilly operate through and terminate at other regional stations, such as Manchester Airport and Stalybridge. Inter-city services to Edinburgh Waverley and Glasgow Central stop at Bolton.

== History ==
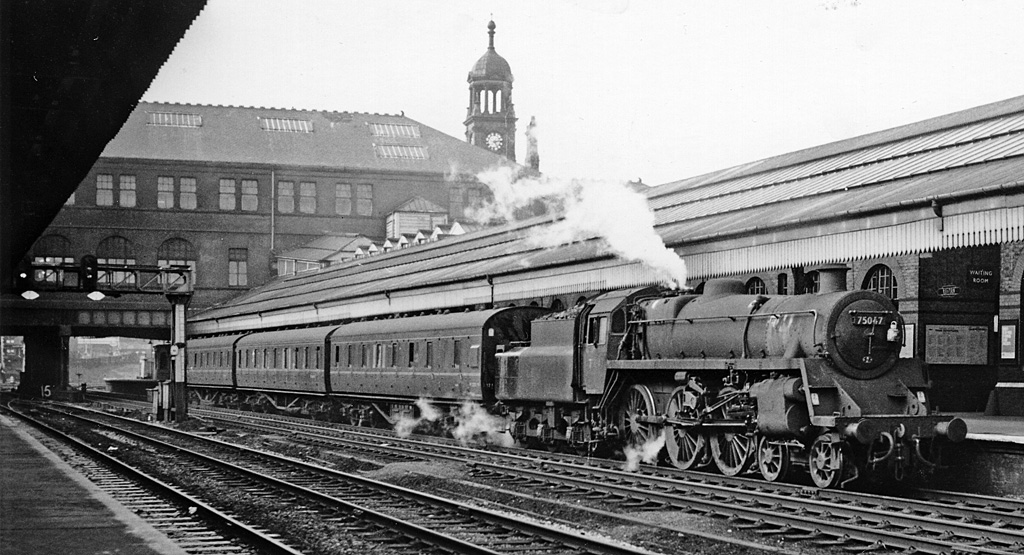
View northward from the main down platform in 1965

Trinity Street station opened when the Manchester and Bolton Railway completed its route to Salford Central in 1838. The line was extended to Manchester Victoria in 1843. This line was extended to Preston by the Bolton and Preston Railway in 1841. The route northwards, now the Ribble Valley Line, to Blackburn followed four years later, whilst the Liverpool and Bury Railway's arrival in 1848 gave the town links eastward to Bury and Rochdale, and westwards to Wigan and Liverpool. These lines had all become part of the Lancashire and Yorkshire Railway system by 1858.

The network of routes radiating from Bolton has remained largely unchanged to this day, the one exception being the line to Rochdale which closed on 5 October 1970. Through trains to Liverpool ended in 1977 with the closure of Liverpool Exchange, but the line to Wigan remains open. Trains to Manchester Piccadilly and beyond began in May 1988 with the opening of the Windsor Link.

Automatic ticket barriers have been operational at the station since 12 December 2016. Northern (Arriva Rail North Limited) had announced its intention to install them here (and at several other locations) earlier in the year.

== Facilities ==
The entrance and ticket office are at street level, at which there is a footbridge to the bus station and the taxi rank. A walkway leads to the platforms which are in a cutting. Platforms 1 and 3 have a buffet, a large waiting room and toilets. Platforms 4 and 5 have a small waiting room with toilets.

Parking facilities here were closed permanently on 24 January 2017.

=== Refurbishment ===
In 2005 and 2006, part of the station and its surrounding area underwent major refurbishment. The walkway between the ticket office and platforms was modernised, along with the station lifts and stairs. Bolton Interchange, which serves as a direct connection between bus and rail services, was rebuilt; it incorporated a taxi rank. The bridge connecting Newport Street, with the rest of the town centre was also rebuilt, along with a large arch, which is clearly noticeable in the Bolton skyline.

In 2006, a proposal to refurbish the station toilets, waiting rooms, ticket office and platforms was rejected, due to lack of funds. In March 2010, GMPTE launched a consultation which proposed relocating the bus station from Moor Lane to a new site adjacent to Bolton Interchange, to improve connections between bus and train services. Refurbishment work on the ticket office, platforms and cafe commenced on 15 November 2010.

The new interchange, built on land bounded by Newport Street and Great Moor Street, replaced the old Moor Lane bus station. It provides vastly improved waiting areas, passenger facilities, information, safety and security. It directly connects bus and rail services via a Skylink pedestrian footbridge, improving transport links, as well as access to the town centre.

It offers enhanced accessibility with a modern concourse and passenger facilities; these include a retail outlet, bicycle hub, shop mobility, café and modern public toilets with adult and baby changing facilities. It also makes use of innovative sustainable energy initiatives, including rainwater recycling to flush the toilets, solar panels, air source heat pumps and low-energy LED lighting.

The new transport interchange was delivered by Kier Construction for Transport for Greater Manchester (TfGM), in partnership with Bolton Council. The £48 million scheme was funded by the Greater Manchester Transport Fund, which supports the Bolton Town Centre Transport Strategy and the wider town centre regeneration plans.

Network Rail refurbished the lifts for a second time in 2024, to improve the reliability of step-free access at the station.

== Electrification ==
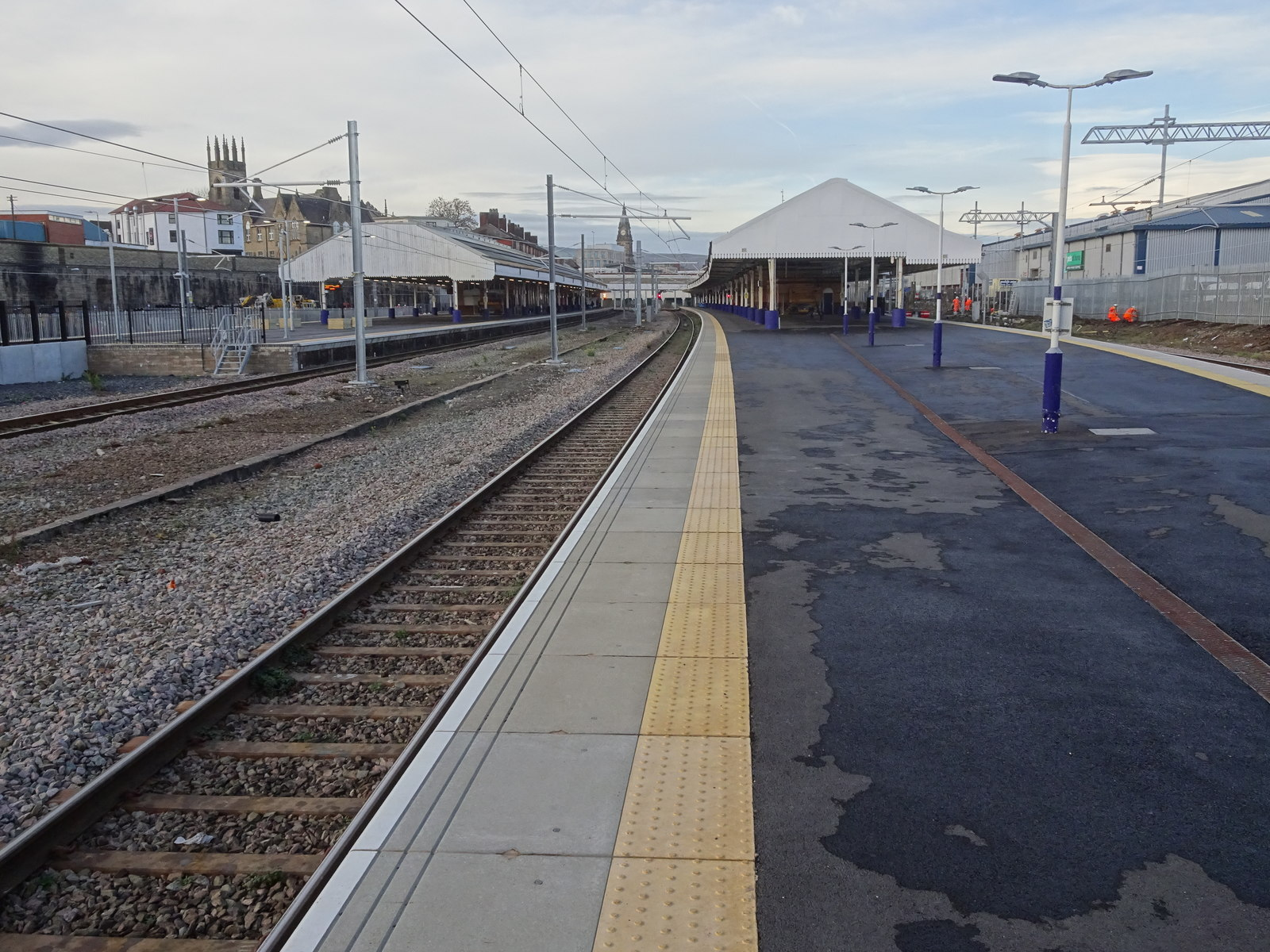
Platforms at Bolton Interchange in 2018, following electrification

Between May and December 2015, to facilitate the electrification of the route from Manchester to Preston, a reduced service pattern was in place, as only one track through the Farnworth Tunnel could be used due to its reboring to accommodate twin tracks. During this period, many TransPennine Express services were rerouted via Wigan North Western, avoiding Bolton altogether. At the weekends, train services between Manchester and Bolton were replaced by buses. In April 2016, in preparation for electrification, Orlando St. bridge was replaced, Soho St. bridge was demolished and track lowering took place in the Bullfield Tunnels area.

Another 15 day blockade took place between 12 and 27 August 2017, to permit further work at the station including the reinstatement of platform 5, erecting a new footbridge, installation of overhead wiring and signalling upgrades. Buses replaced trains on most routes, with through services diverted via Atherton or Wigan North Western. The work was completed on schedule on 28 August, but the line towards Manchester remained closed following the work due to an embankment collapse and bridge damage at Moses Gate, caused by a burst water main. As a result, the only service running was that to and from Blackburn, with other trains diverted away and replacement bus services to Manchester, Wigan and Preston in place. The line reopened to traffic on 6 September 2017, upon completion of the repairs to the bridge supports and embankment; normal working resumed on all routes.

The electrification work at the station was due to be completed in time for the December 2017 timetable change, which would have seen a major revamp of the service pattern in operation. The work however fell well behind schedule, with Network Rail admitting in January 2018 that the work would not even be completed in time for the next timetable change in May. This was due to unexpected problems with poor ground conditions in several locations, which meant that some 200 masts for the overhead wires could not be installed as planned. In order to complete the remaining work by the end of the year (both piling for the masts and the actual wiring), further weekend blockades were imposed by Network Rail, which were expected to continue until November 2018 (along with a nine-day line closure in late August). The planned timetable revamp, including the return of trains to Glasgow Central and Edinburgh Waverley with through services to south Manchester and Cheshire, also had to be postponed until May 2019; this was because many of these improvements were dependent on the availability of electric rolling stock.

The first overnight electric test trains ran successfully in December 2018. Services commenced on 11 February 2019 with Class 319 electric multiple units.

== Services ==
Bolton is served by two train operating companies; the typical off-peak service in trains per hour/day (tph/tpd) is:

Northern Trains:

- 1 tph to Lancaster, with 11 tpd continuing to Barrow-in-Furness and 4 tpd continuing to Windermere
- 2 tph to Blackpool North
- 2 tph to Southport
- 2 tph to Blackburn, with 1 tph continuing to Clitheroe
- 1 tph to Stalybridge
- 3 tph to Manchester Airport
- 1 tph to Manchester Oxford Road
- 2 tph to Rochdale, via Manchester Victoria.

TransPennine Express:

- 1 tph to Manchester Airport
- 1 tp2h to Edinburgh Waverley
- 1 tp2h to Glasgow Central.

Preceding station	National Rail	Following station
Preston	TransPennine Express Anglo-Scottish Route Not for passenger use to/from Manchester	Manchester Oxford Road
Chorley	Northern Trains Barrow-in-Furness/Windermere to Manchester Airport	Deansgate
Lostock	Northern Trains Blackpool North to Manchester Airport	Salford Crescent
Hall i' th' Wood	Northern Trains Ribble Valley line	Salford Crescent
Westhoughton	Northern Trains Southport to Manchester Oxford Road Monday to Saturday	Salford Crescent
Westhoughton	Northern Trains Southport to Stalybridge Monday to Saturday	Moses Gate
Westhoughton	Northern Trains Wigan North Western to Stalybridge Sunday only	Farnworth
	Historical railways	
The Oaks; Line open, station closed	Lancashire and Yorkshire Railway	Moses Gate; Line and station open
	Disused railways	
Astley Bridge; Line and station closed	Lancashire and Yorkshire Railway; Astley Bridge Branch	Terminus
Lostock Junction; Line and station open	Lancashire and Yorkshire Railway; Liverpool and Bury Railway	Darcy Lever; Line and station closed

== Bus connections ==
Several bus companies provide a comprehensive route network of services around Bolton and the surrounding areas; many operate under the Bee Network branding. These include Diamond North West, Go North West, Stagecoach Cumbria & Lancashire and Blackburn Bus Company. Destinations include Farnworth, Preston, Manchester, the Trafford Centre, Westhoughton, Bury, Blackburn and Leigh. Additionally, rail replacement buses are operated by Tyrers or Atlantic Travel.
