= Kearsley railway station =

Railway station in Greater Manchester, England

Coordinates: 53.5446°N 2.3755°W

Kearsley
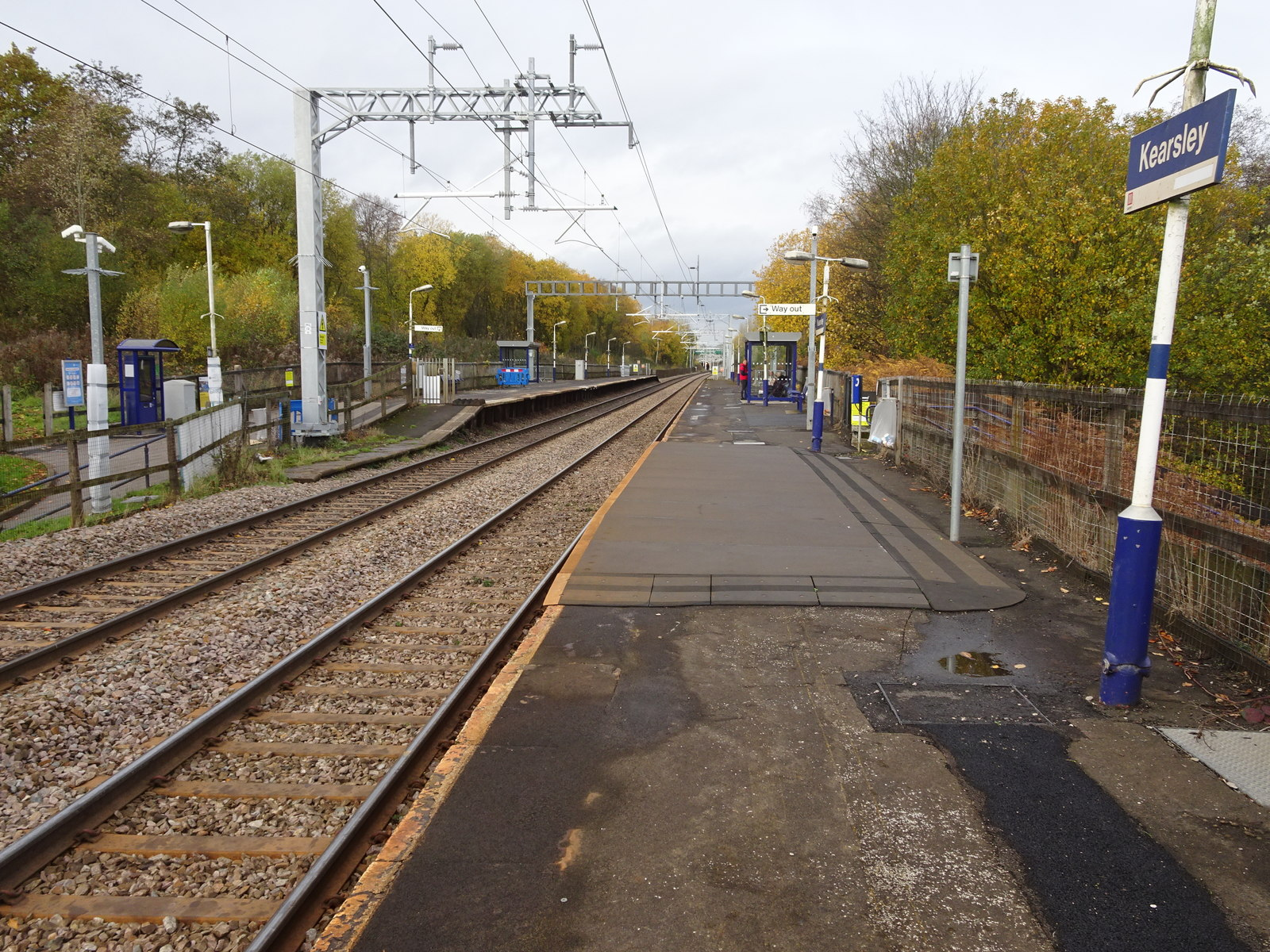
- Kearsley railway station in 2018

General information
- Location: Kearsley, Bolton; England
- Grid reference: SD752054
- Manager: Northern
- Transit authority: Greater Manchester
- Platforms: 2

Other information
- Station code: KSL
- Classification: DfT category F2

History
- Original company: Manchester, Bolton and Bury Railway
- Pre-grouping: Lancashire and Yorkshire Railway
- Post-grouping: London, Midland and Scottish Railway

Key dates
- 29 May 1838: Station opened as Ringley
- 1838: Renamed Stoneclough
- 7 February 1894: Renamed Kearsley and Stoneclough
- February 1903: Renamed Kearsley

Passengers
- 2021/22: ▲40,976
- 2022/23: ▲48,408
- 2023/24: ▲52,174
- 2024/25: ▲54,888
- 2025/26: ▲61,736
Location
Notes
- Passenger statistics from the Office of Rail and Road

Kearsley railway station serves the town of Kearsley and the outlying villages of Stoneclough, Prestolee and Ringley in Greater Manchester, England. It was originally named Stoneclough.

It lies on the Manchester-Preston Line 7 3/4 miles (12.5 km) north of Manchester Victoria, though only local services run by Northern Trains stop here.

The station was staffed until the early 1990s, however the arson attacking of the station building just below platform level saw an end to this arrangement. In the spring of 2015, the station's pedestrian rail crossing was replaced by a footbridge and the platforms rebuilt as part of modernisation work to electrify the line and raise line speeds to 100 mph.

== Facilities ==
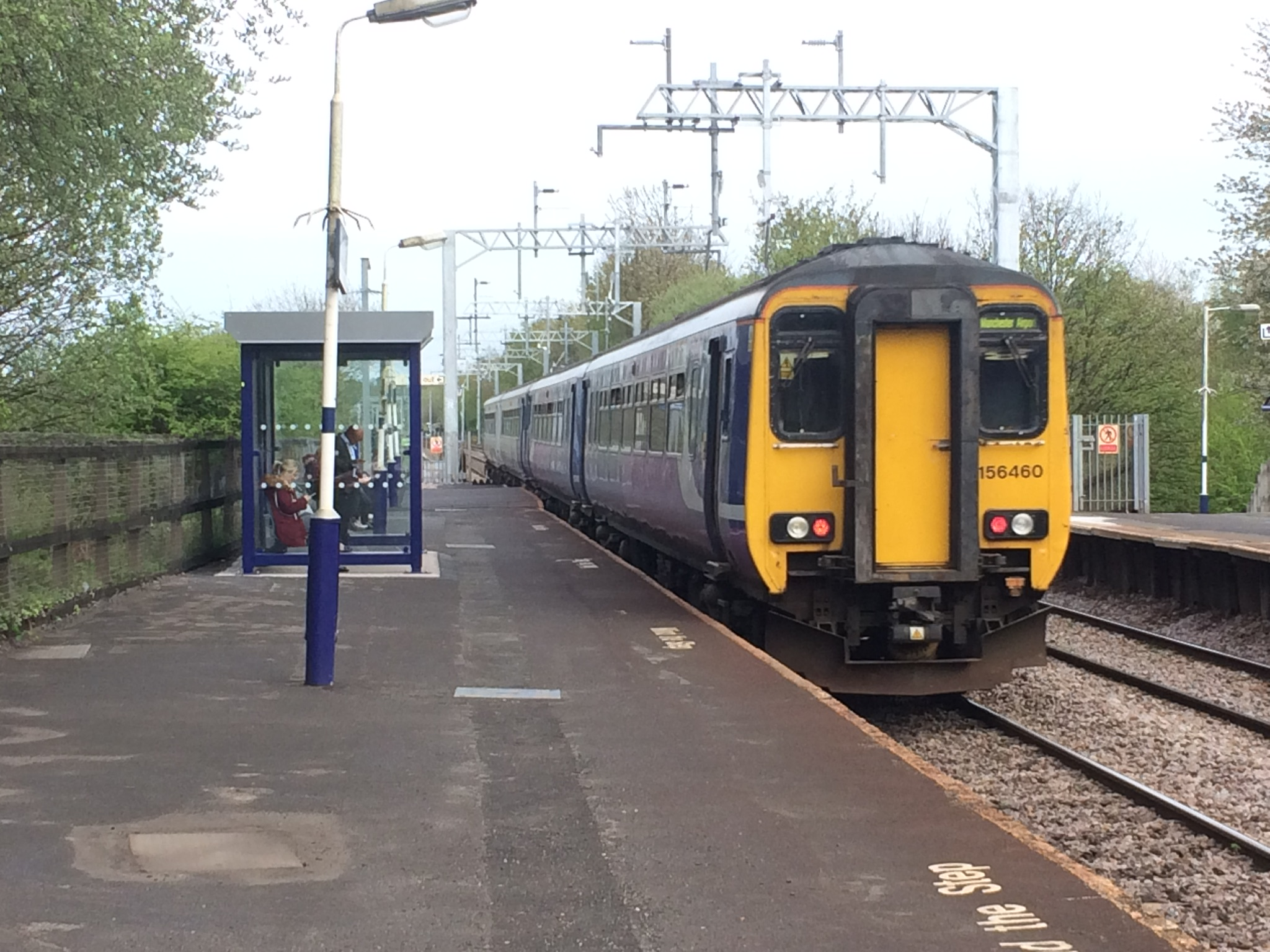
A Northern Class 156 at Kearsley's Manchester-bound platform, prior to completion of electrification works.

The station is unstaffed, however, there is a ticket machine on the Bolton-bound platform that allows passengers to pay for a ticket by card. Passengers wishing to pay by cash can use these machines to obtain a ‘Promise to Pay’ ticket. There are simple waiting shelters on each platform, with train running information provided by telephone and timetable posters. Step free access is available to both platforms via Station Road. However, passengers coming from Stoneclough village would have to walk further to access these facilities.

== Services ==
There is an hourly service northbound to Bolton and Southport, and southbound to Manchester Victoria and Stalybridge, throughout the day Mondays to Saturdays. Evening trains began stopping here at the May 2018 timetable change, but electrification work on the Manchester to Preston route saw all weekend trains replaced by buses for most of 2017–18; electric service eventually starting on Monday 11 February 2019 initially utilising Class 319 electric multiple units (though the Wigan to Manchester trains serving the station are still diesel operated).

There is no Sunday service from the station.

=== 21st century upgrade and electrification ===
In 2009 in a government paper, Andrew Adonis proposed infill electrification schemes in the North West of England. After a spending review, in July 2012 the Coalition government announced 25 kV AC railway electrification, reconfirming the scheme previously announced by Adonis. Amongst schemes announced for electrification were Manchester - Euxton Junction through Kearsley railway station and thence to Euxton Junction. The project also called for a major civil engineering project to rebore the Farnworth tunnel on the line in advance of electrification.

Preceding station	National Rail	Following station
Farnworth	Northern Trains; Manchester–Southport line	Clifton
	Historical railways	
Farnworth; Line and station open	Lancashire and Yorkshire Railway; Manchester and Bolton Railway	Dixon Fold; Line open, station closed
