= Salford Crescent railway station =

Railway station in Greater Manchester, England

Coordinates: 53°29′11″N 2°16′33″W

Salford Crescent for University of Salford
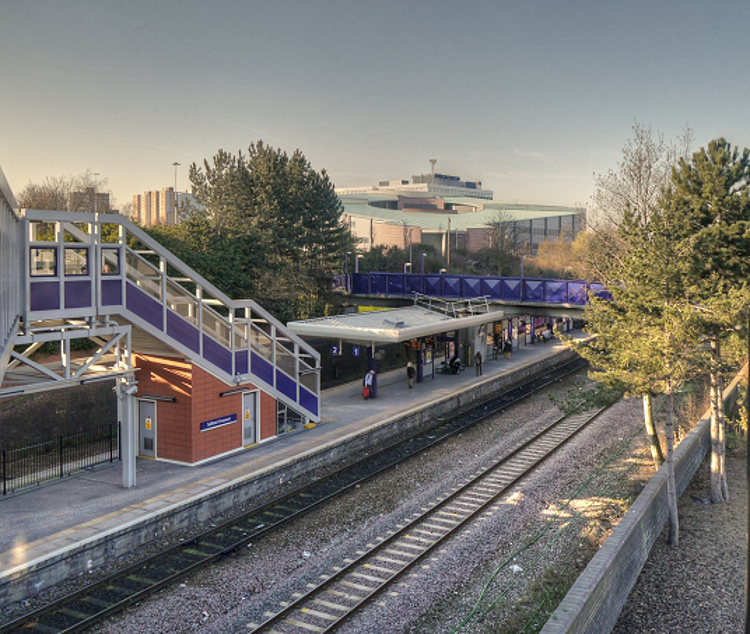
- Salford Crescent railway station in 2014

General information
- Location: Salford, City of Salford; England
- Grid reference: SJ818988
- Managed by: Northern Trains
- Transit authority: Greater Manchester
- Platforms: 2 (3rd under construction)

Other information
- Station code: SLD
- Classification: DfT category C2

History
- Original company: British Rail

Key dates
- 11 May 1987: Station opened

Passengers
- 2020/21: ▼0.320 million
- Interchange: ▼0.131 million
- 2021/22: ▲0.956 million
- Interchange: ▲0.284 million
- 2022/23: ▲1.121 million
- Interchange: ▼0.245 million
- 2023/24: ▲1.207 million
- Interchange: ▼0.173 million
- 2024/25: ▲1.307 million
- Interchange: ▲0.176 million
Location
Notes
- Passenger statistics from the Office of Rail and Road

Salford Crescent railway station is a railway station in Salford, Greater Manchester, England, opened by British Rail in 1987.

The station is 1 mile (1.6 km) west of Salford Central, 1.75 miles (2.82 km) west of Manchester Victoria and 2.25 miles (3.62 km) west of Manchester Piccadilly. It consists of a single island platform with a ticket office and waiting room.

The station is near the University of Salford, between the Peel Park and Frederick Road Campus.

Salford Crescent is the point of a split in the Manchester–Preston line, with local services running on to Manchester Victoria and long-distance services going to Manchester Piccadilly (via the 1988 Windsor Link to Ordsall Lane Junction), and is also part of the line between Manchester and Southport, frequently being used as an interchange between the two lines. Manchester North signalling centre was formerly located at the station, prior to its closure in April 2015. Ticket gates have been in operation at the station since 2016.

== Services ==
All services are operated by Northern Trains. As of December 2022, the typical weekday off-peak service is:

Northbound

- 2tph to Blackpool North
- 2tph to Southport
- 2tph to Blackburn via Bolton, with 1tph continuing to Clitheroe
- 1tph to Headbolt Lane
- 1tph to Wigan Wallgate

Southbound

- 2tph to Manchester Airport
- 1tph to Manchester Oxford Road
- 1tph to Stalybridge
- 2tph to Rochdale
- 1tph to Leeds
- 1tph to Blackburn via Manchester Victoria and Rochdale

Services are significantly reduced on Sundays, with 1 train per hour to each of Blackpool North, Southport, Clitheroe, Wigan North Western, Stalybridge, Blackburn via Manchester Victoria and Manchester Airport.

Engineering work on the heavily delayed Manchester–Preston line electrification project saw all weekend services here suspended (and replaced by buses) for much of 2017-18 (through trains being diverted via Eccles and the West Coast Main Line) - these blockades continued until November 2018. Electric services commenced on Monday 11 February 2019 utilising Class 319 electric multiple units.

== Connecting bus routes ==
Salford Crescent is served by route 50, operated by Metroline Manchester on behalf of Transport for Greater Manchester's Bee Network, a radial cross-city bus service between East Didsbury and MediaCityUK. Routes 8, 31, 36, 37, 67 and 100 also stop outside the station and run to Manchester, terminating at either Piccadilly Gardens or Shudehill Interchange. Services from Manchester head towards Bolton, Eccles, Swinton, Pendlebury, Trafford Centre, Warrington and Farnworth.

== Improvements ==
In 2007, Network Rail recognised that Salford Crescent could not cope with existing passenger levels, leading to platform overcrowding. It suggested expansion of the station with extra platforms, greater use of it as an interchange and use as a terminus for services from east of Manchester. It also raised the possibility of moving the station.

In 2012, improvement work started at the station, including platform extensions, a new rain canopy and the relocation of the ticket office to street level. The works were completed in October 2013 and officially opened by Mayor of Salford, Ian Stewart.

On 25 May 2023, it was announced that a third platform would be added.

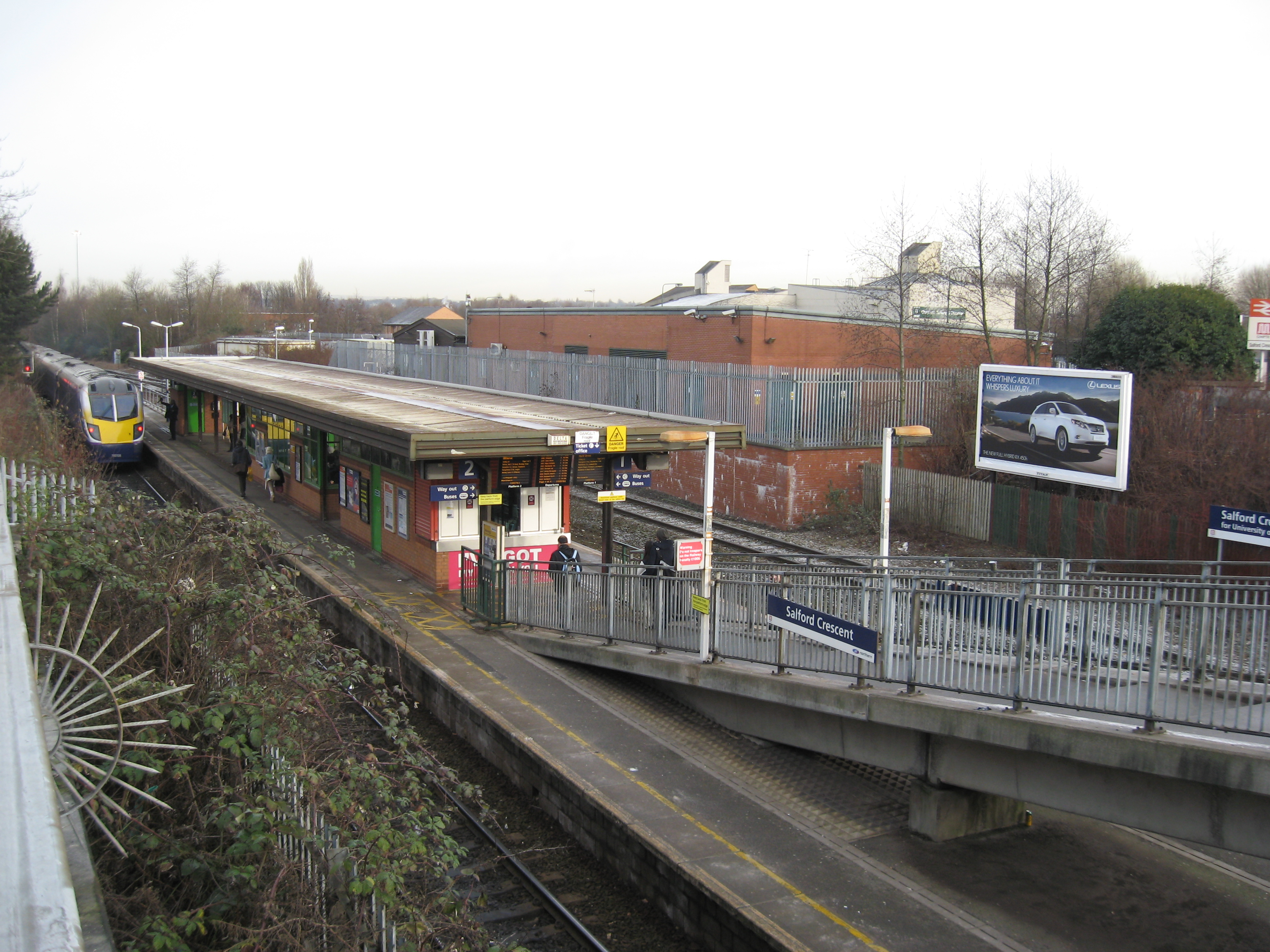
The station in 2010, prior to the improvement works.

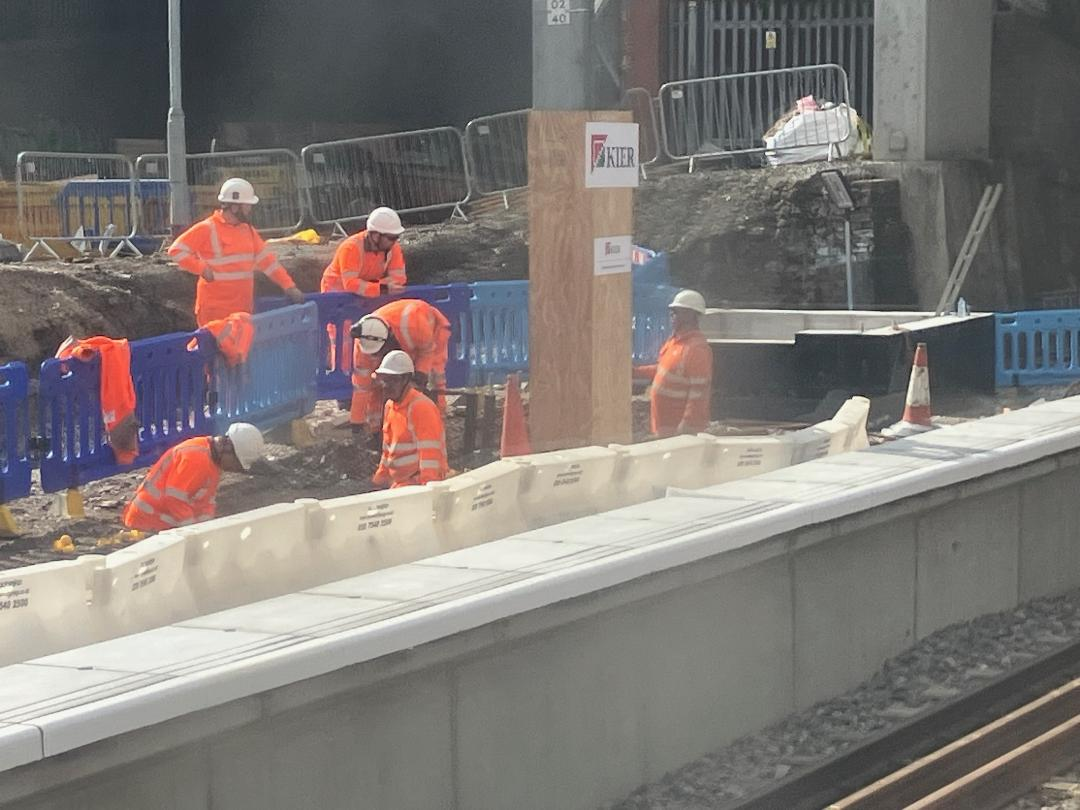
Work in progress at Salford Crescent Railway station July 2025

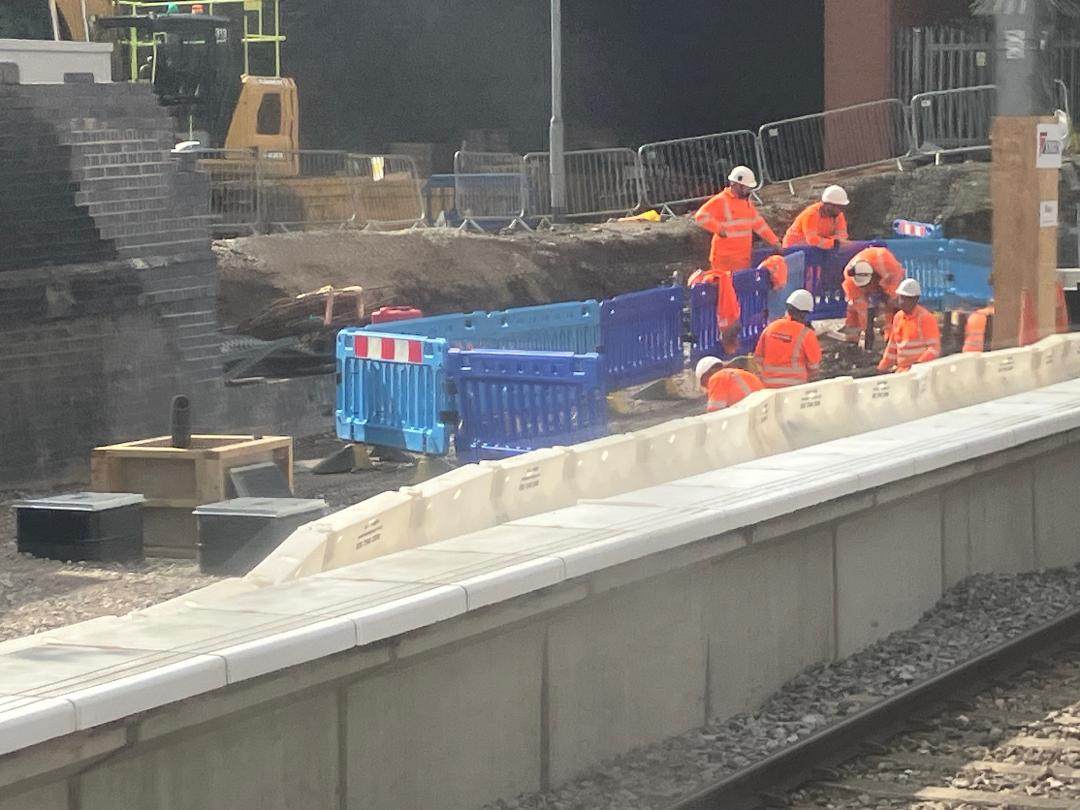
Work in progress at Salford Crescent Railway station July 2025

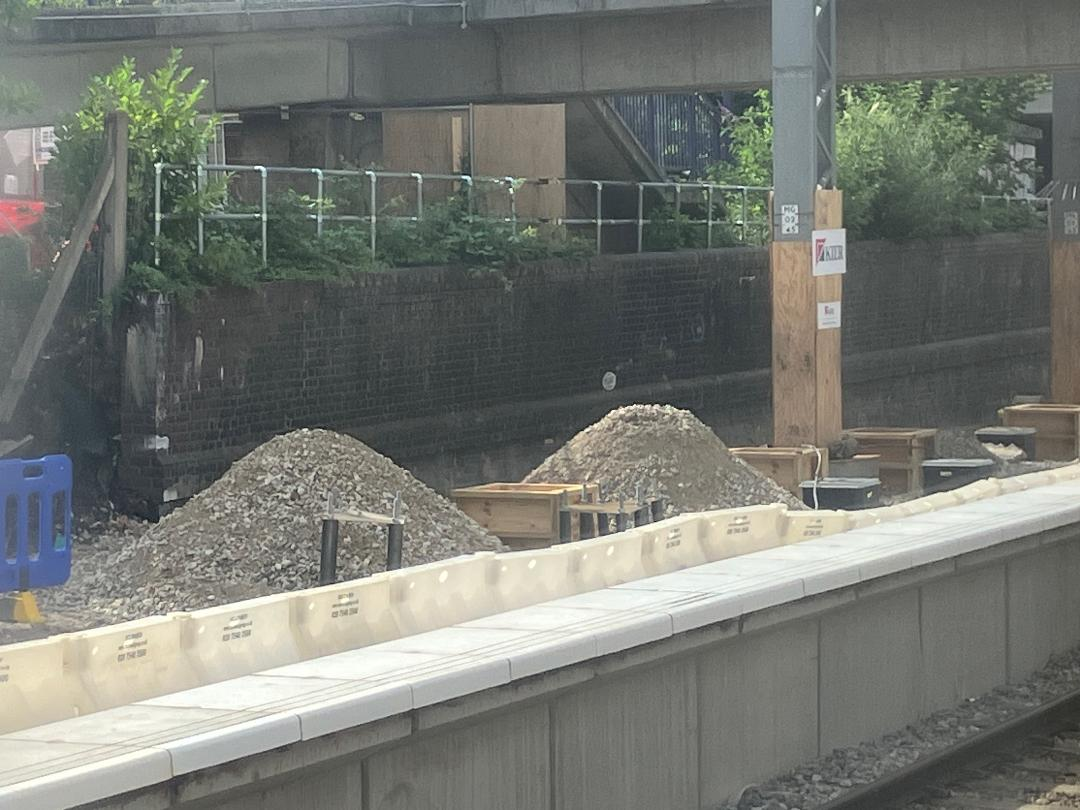
Work in progress at Salford Crescent Railway station July 2025

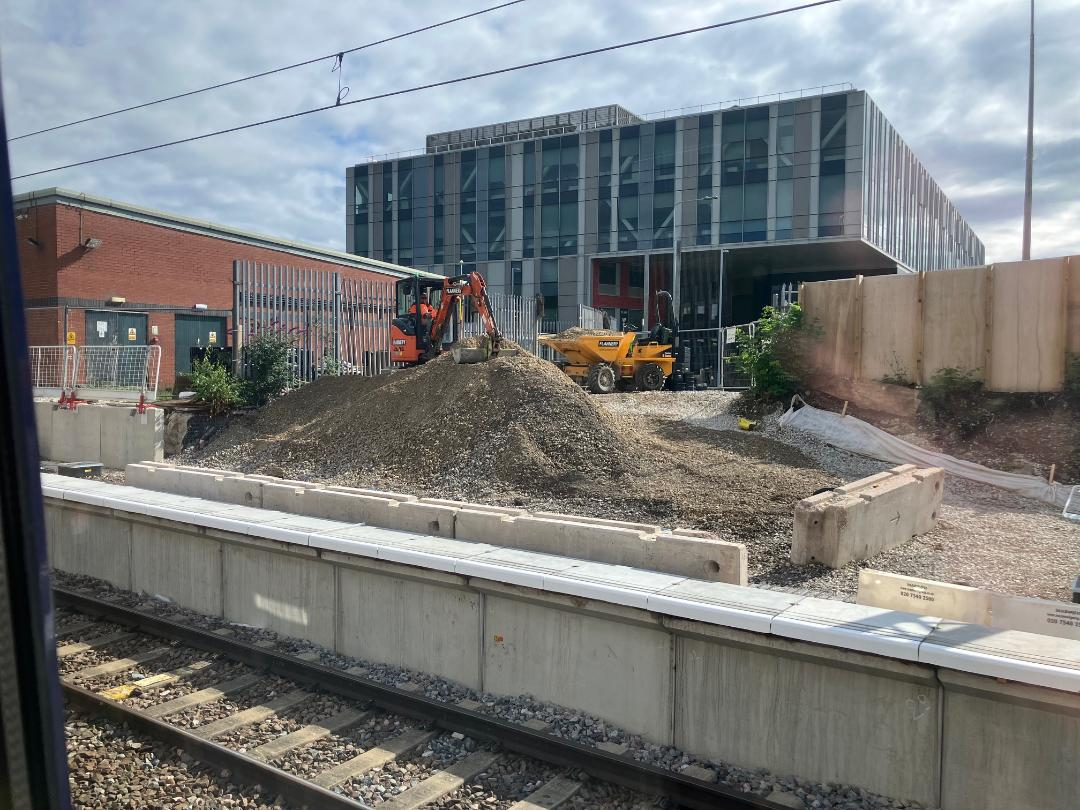
Work in progress at Salford Crescent Railway station July 2025

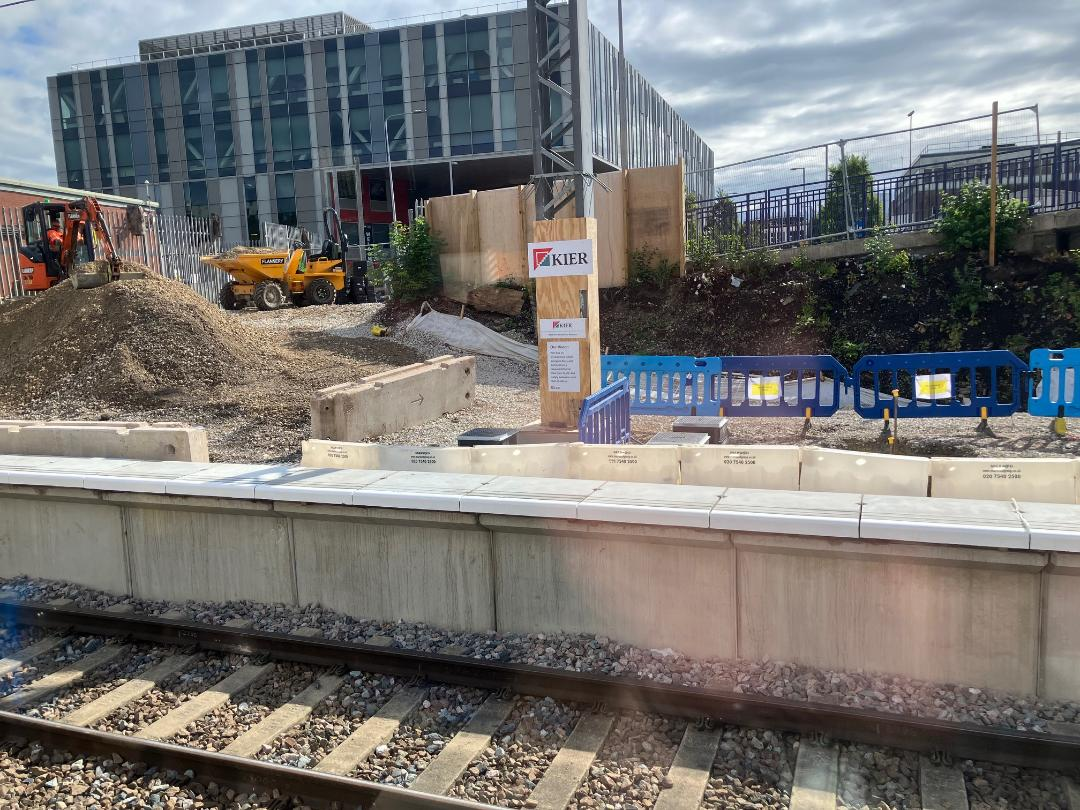
Work in progress at Salford Crescent Railway station July 2025

== Electrification ==
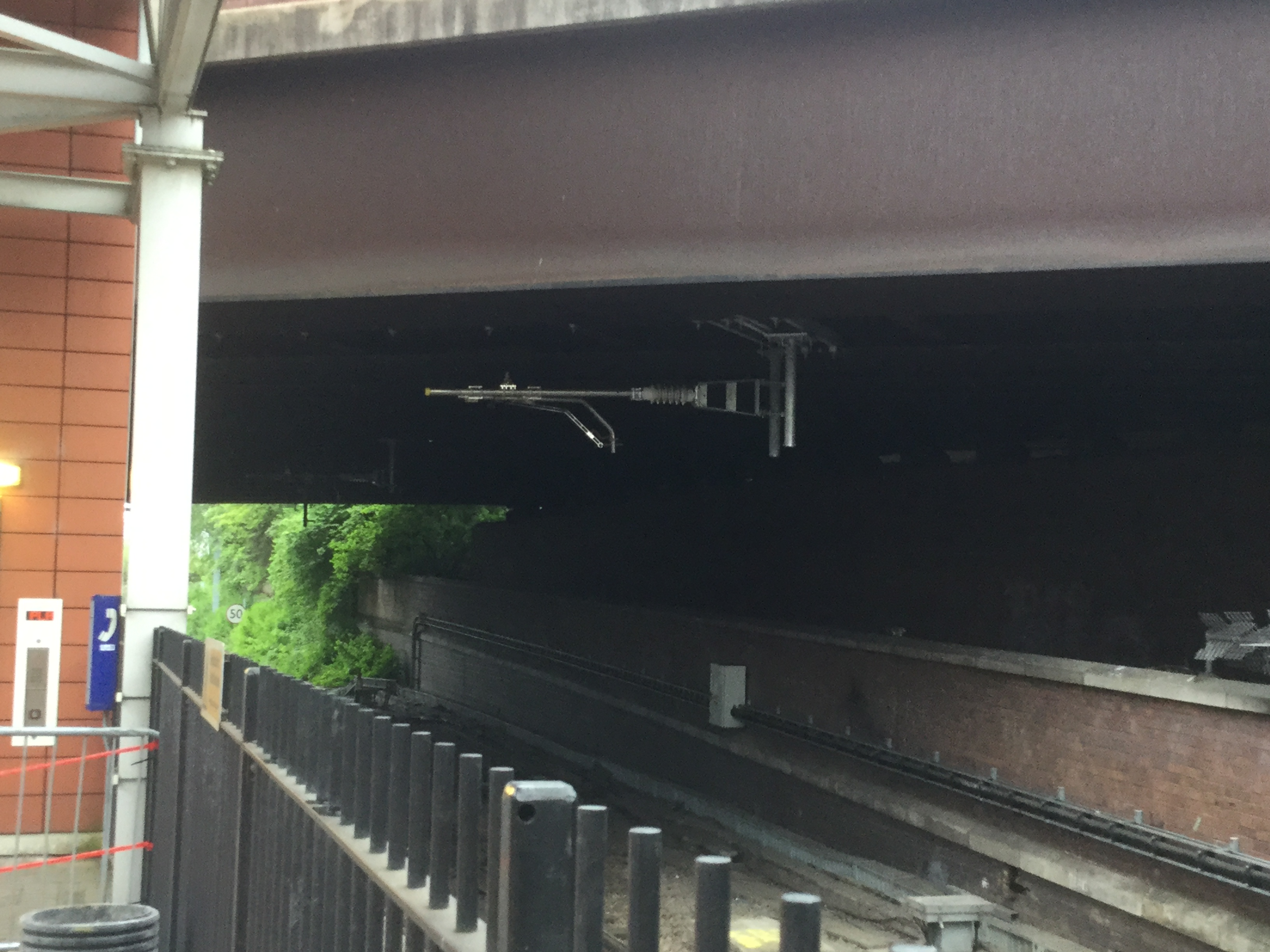
The station in early 2018, undergoing electrification works

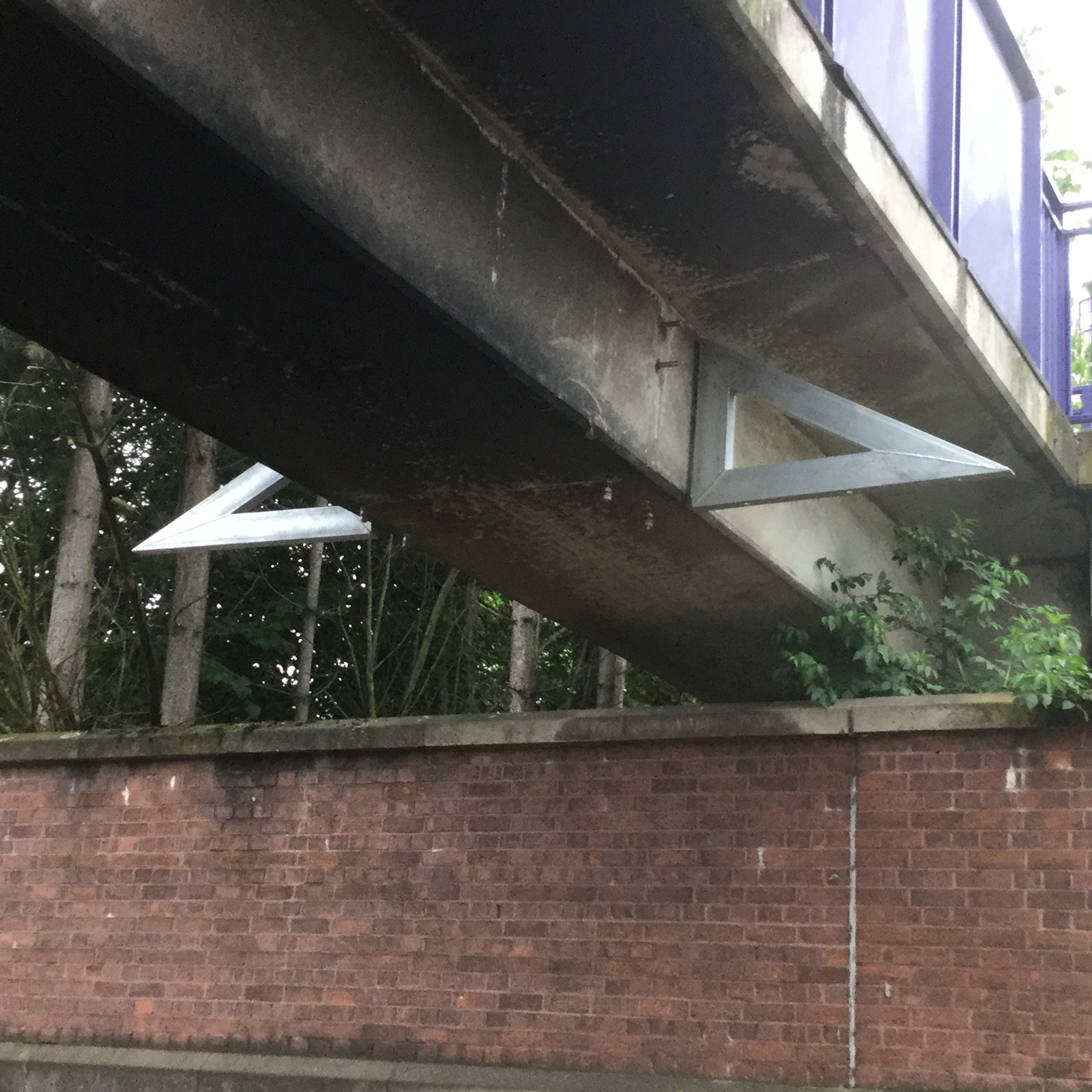
The station in early 2018, undergoing electrification works

Although it does not include the line via Atherton to Wigan, the main line connecting Manchester stations to Preston and Blackpool passing through Salford Crescent has been electrified. The physical-civil engineering work was hit by a number of delays which delayed its completion by two years. The first electric test trains ran on the night of 13 December 2018, and the first electric passenger services commenced in early February 2019, utilising Class 319 electric multiple units.

== Facilities ==
The station's ticket office is staffed throughout the week (06:30 to 21:45 weekdays and Saturdays, 09:10 to 16:00 on Sundays) and there is a self-service ticket machine in the booking hall. A waiting room, digital information screens and automated announcements are provided at platform level. Step-free access is via a lift from the road bridge and ticket hall (there is also a staircase to the platform).

Preceding station	National Rail	Following station
Kearsley	Northern Trains Stalybridge to Southport	Salford Central
Clifton	Northern Trains Stalybridge to Southport	Salford Central
Swinton	Northern Trains Kirkby to Blackburn via Manchester	Salford Central
Swinton	Northern Trains Leeds to Wigan Wallgate	Salford Central
Bolton	Northern Trains Ribble Valley line	Salford Central
Bolton	Northern Trains Manchester Oxford Road to Southport	Deansgate
Bolton	Northern Trains Manchester Airport to Blackpool North	Deansgate
