= Leonard Fairclough =

Leonard Fairclough (1853–1927) was a stonemason who founded Leonard Fairclough & Son which later merged with William Press Group to become AMEC, one of the United Kingdom's largest engineering businesses.

== Career ==
Fairclough was born in 1853 in Adlington, Lancashire. He apprenticed locally and duly qualified as a stonemason. He set up in business on his own in 1883, initially carving funeral monuments.

He subsequently brought his son, Leonard Miller Fairclough, into the business which was renamed Leonard Fairclough & Son. They gradually moved into general contracting building their first bridge in 1905. Leonard Fairclough Senior was Chairman of the business until he died in 1927.
