= Richard Clayton =

Richard Clayton may refer to:

- Richard Clayton (dean of Peterborough) (died 1612), English churchman and academic
- Richard Clayton (academic) (died 1676), academic and administrator at University College, Oxford
- Richard Clayton (Irish judge) (1702–1770), Member of Parliament for Wigan, 1747–1754
- Sir Richard Clayton, 1st Baronet (1745–1828), English translator
- Rice Richard Clayton (1798–1879), Member of Parliament for Aylesbury, 1841–1847
- Richard Clayton (clergyman) (1802–1856), English clergyman of Newcastle upon Tyne
- Richard Clayton (actor) (1915–2008), American actor
- Richard Clayton (Royal Navy officer) (1925–1984)
- Richard Henry Michael Clayton (1907–1993), English novelist who wrote under the pseudonym William Haggard

== See also ==
- Dick Clayton (disambiguation)
- Clayton Richard (born 1983), American baseball pitcher
- Clayton (disambiguation)
