= Ray Daniels =

British army and businessman

Ray Daniels MC
- Born: 15 July 1923; Pinner, Middlesex, England
- Died: 27 April 2003 (aged 79)
- Education: Bedford Modern School

Lieutenant-Colonel Ray Daniels MC (15 July 1923 – 27 April 2003) was awarded the Military Cross for his ‘exemplary actions during fierce fighting’ at the Battle of Cloppenburg in 1945, played rugby for Wasps RFC after World War II and later became Chief Executive of the William Press Group that he led to become a FTSE 100 company in the mid-1970s and early 1980s.

== Early years ==
Raymond Alfred Daniels was born on 15 July 1923 at Pinner, Middlesex and educated at Bedford Modern School. After school he enlisted in the Buffs where he won the regimental heavyweight boxing title while still a private.

After completing his officer cadet training, he was commissioned into the Royal Sussex Regiment, later transferring to the 7th Battalion Hampshire Regiment where he served as a platoon commander in A Company.

== World War II ==
The 7th Battalion landed on the Arromanches beaches on 22 June 1944 and ‘suffered severe losses in the Norman bocage with its undulating fields, woods and high hedges which greatly favoured the defenders’. In August, the British ‘broke out of the bridgehead and the 7th Hampshires took part in the action to capture the Mount Pincon feature, the highest point in Normandy and strongly defended by the enemy’. Daniels was mentioned in despatches.

On 13 April 1945 the 7th Battalion Hampshire Regiment ‘was ordered to clear the town of Cloppenburg and to secure two bridges over the river which ran through it. As the 7th Battalion approached the main bridge at Cloppenburg was demolished and the Germans strongly resisted before B Company and D Company were able to force a crossing via the remaining bridge and establish themselves on the other side of the river. A Company, the leading platoon commanded by Lt Daniels, then passed through B Company on the right and was immediately plunged into a confused, close-quarter battle among the streets and rabbit warrens of ruined houses’.

A Company was ‘then harassed by two self-propelled guns firing at point-blank range down the main road, but because of the close nature of the engagement, it was impossible to provide fire support, nor could tanks be brought over the small remaining bridge. In the fierce fighting which ensued, Daniels was severely wounded in the face and head but refused to leave his platoon until he had reorganised it and handed it over to his sergeant. His dash, leadership and courage at Cloppenburg and throughout the whole campaign were recognised by the award of the MC’.

On 9 September Daniels entered a liberated Brussels with 7 Hampshires and fought with the Battalion in a succession of actions including Operation Market Garden and the Battle of Reichswald. At Cloppenburg, their final battle, the Battalion lost many men but took a heavy toll of the enemy.

== Civilian life ==
Following the end of World War II, Daniels played rugby for the Army, the Wasps and Eastern Counties. In 1948, he left the Army to join William Press & Son, the civil engineering contractors that was to become the William Press Group, as a trainee. He was promoted quickly and played a key part in the company's expansion into the offshore oil and gas industries. In the mid-1970s, Daniels was appointed chief executive of the William Press Group, a position that he held until his retirement in 1982. The company merged with Leonard Fairclough & Son in 1982 to form AMEC.

He served with the Engineer and Logistic Staff Corps RE for many years before retiring in 1997 as Lieutenant-Colonel.

== Personal life ==
Ray Daniels married Helen Clark in 1954 and they had three sons. He died on 27 April 2003.
