= Euston Arch =

Propylaea to London's first intercity rail terminus

Coordinates: 51.528586°N 0.133746°W

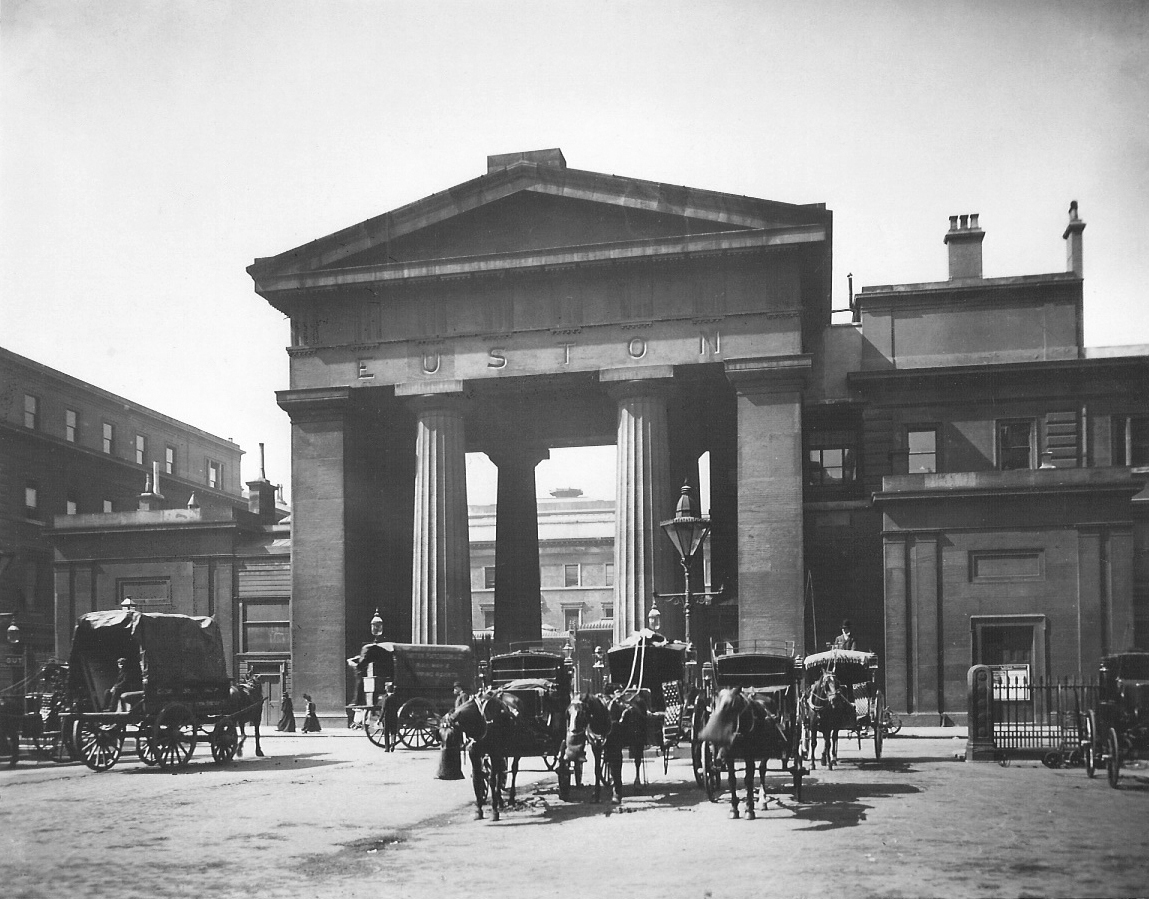
The Euston Arch in the 1890s

The Euston Arch was the original entrance to Euston station, facing onto Drummond Street, London. Built in 1837, the arch was demolished in 1962 during the rebuilding of the station, but much of the original stone was later located—principally used as fill in the Prescott Channel—and proposals have been formulated to reconstruct it as part of the planned redevelopment of the station, including the station's use as the London terminus of the High Speed 2 line.

When Euston station was redeveloped, Drummond Street was split into two parts, on either side of the station complex, with the eastern half renamed Doric Way, after the style of the arch.

== Construction ==
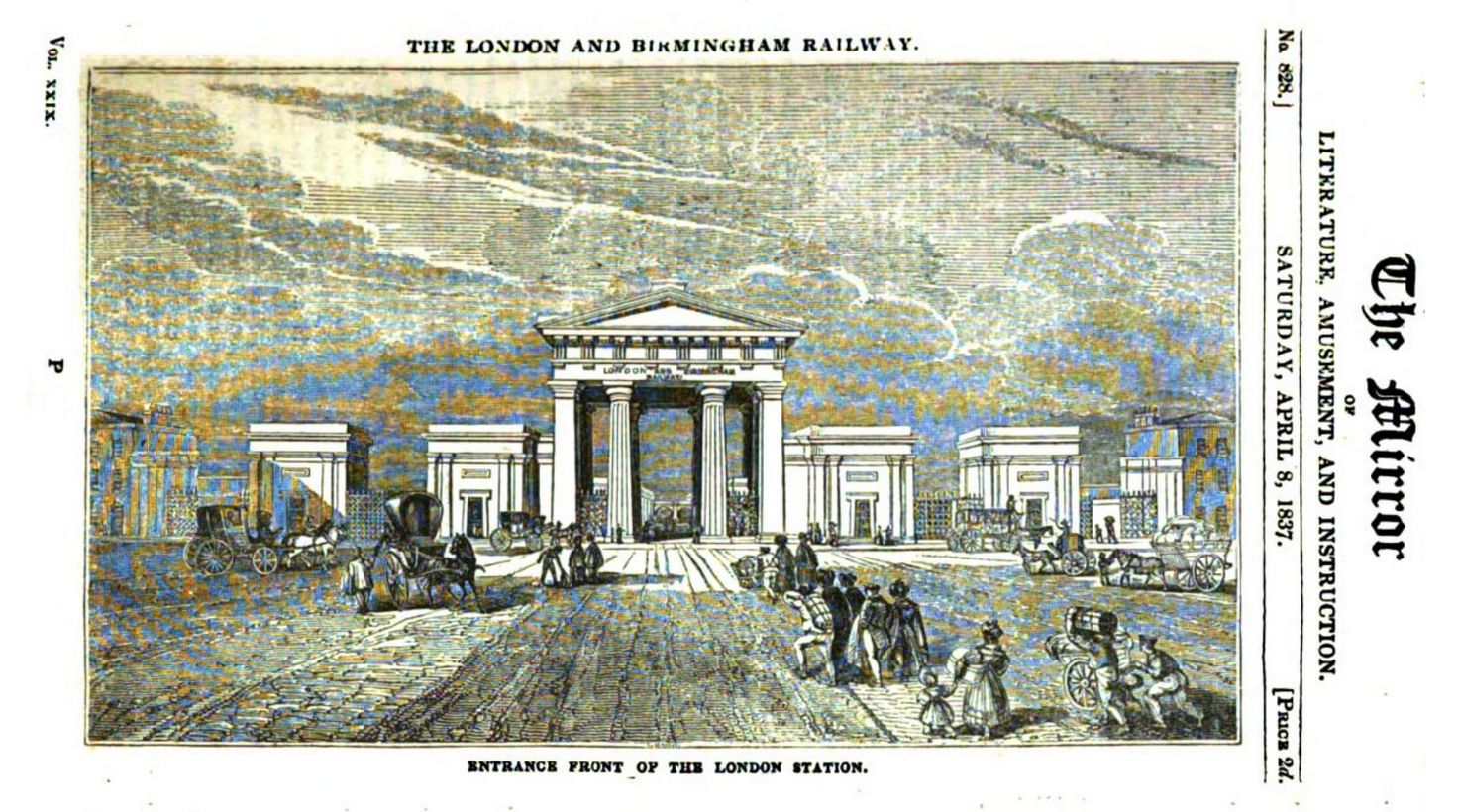
Entrance Front of the London Station by C. F. Cheffins, published 3 April 1837.

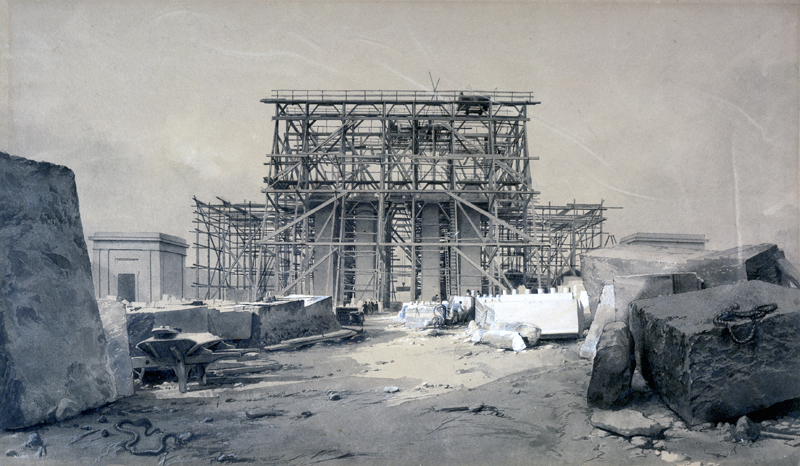
Construction of the Euston Arch, London, January 1838, by John Cooke Bourne; reminiscent of David Roberts' drawings of ancient Egypt.

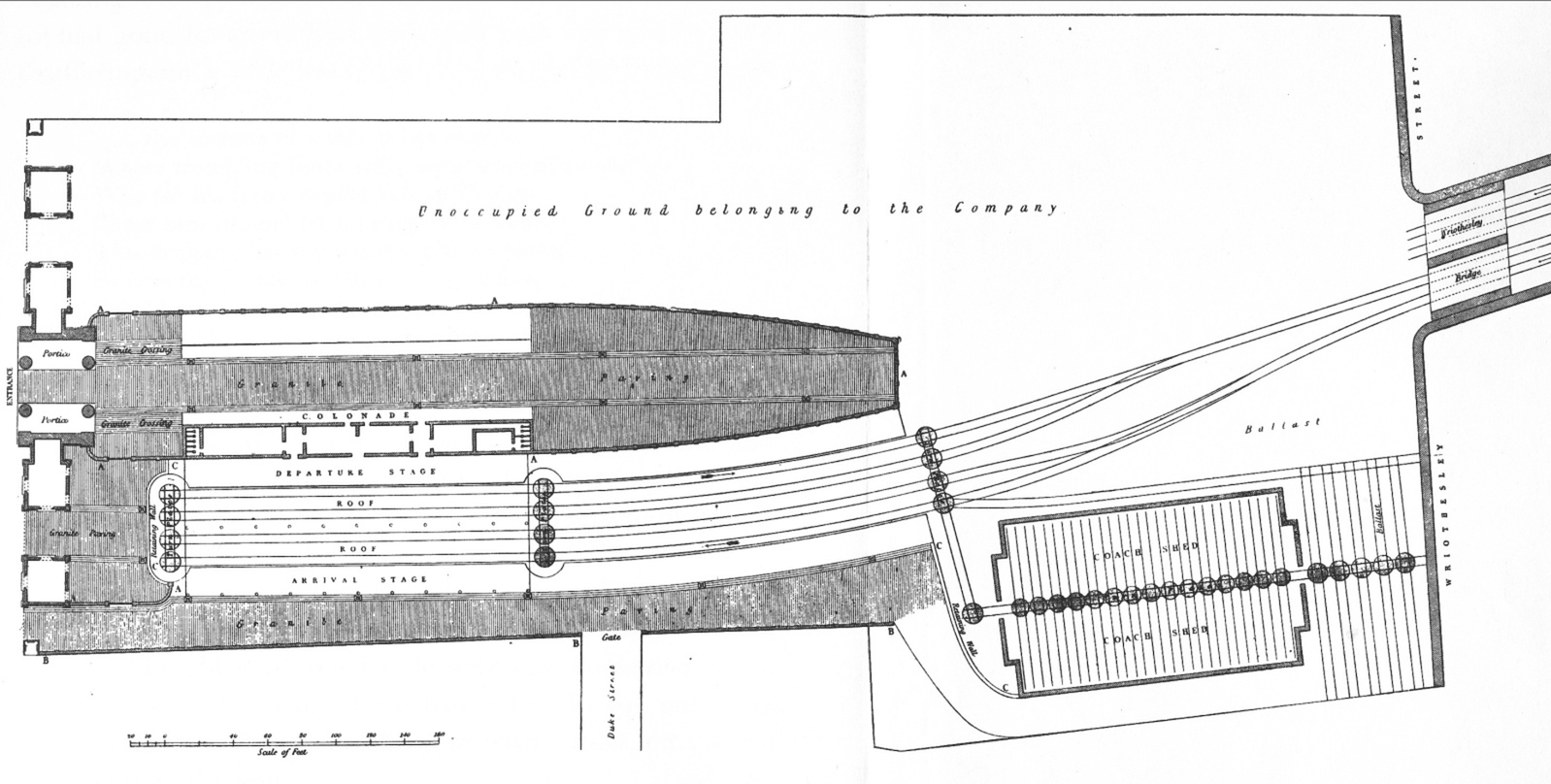
Ground plan of Euston station 1838. The grey areas were open granite paving. The Euston Arch is on the left (south) edge of the plan between its four lodges, forming a grand entrance to the station building, on the departures side of the station

Designed by the architect Philip Hardwick and built by William Cubitt, it was inspired by the Roman architecture Hardwick encountered on a trip to Italy in 1818 and 1819. Strictly speaking it was not an arch at all, nor a portico, but a propylaeum of the Doric order. The sandstone structure was designed for the London and Birmingham Railway (L&BR), complementing Birmingham Curzon Street station, at the other end of the company's mainline. The arch was to be not only a fitting gateway to the Midlands, but to the whole new world which the railway was to open up.

The construction of the arch was announced by the directors of the L&BR in a report dated February 1837:

The Entrance to the London Passenger Station opening immediately upon what will necessarily become the Grand Avenue for travelling between the Metropolis and the midland and northern parts of the Kingdom, the Directors thought that it should receive some architectural embellishment. They adopted accordingly a design of Mr. Hardwick's for a grand but simple portico, which they considered well adapted to the national character of the undertaking.

The arch was supported on four columns, and bronze gates were placed behind them. It stood 70 ft (21 m) high and 44 ft (13 m) deep, while the diameter of each of the columns was 8 feet 6 inches (2.59 m). The structure was built from stone from Bramley in West Riding of Yorkshire, and cost £35,000. Initially it had very little embellishment and no descriptive title until 1870, when the London and North Western Railway (LNWR) incised "Euston" on the architrave in letters of gold. There were two lodges on each side of the arch, executed like it in strictly classical style. Each of these lodges was separated from its neighbour by an imposing pair of bronze gates. One of the gates between the lodges operated as an entrance for carriages and very heavy goods going by train, while one of the lodges was an office for outgoing parcels.

The traveller would drive through the arch into an oblong courtyard running north to south and enclosed by a brick wall nearly 500 ft (150 m) long and 100 ft (30 m) wide. On the eastern side (the arriving traveller's right) was a range of offices behind a colonnade of pillars.

The arch was not admired by everyone in its early years. A guide to London published at the time of the Great Exhibition in 1851 described it as "gigantic and very absurd" and placed "without reference to the courtyard it leads to". The British Almanac for 1839 remarked that it was "noble", emphasising the purity of its style, but stated that "it was not necessary, as in the case of many porticoes to country houses, to have sash windows peeping out between Doric columns; the perfection of the style could be maintained and should be appreciated."

The addition of the station name was part of station improvements in 1869–74 which also saw the creation of an entrance drive from the Euston Road to the portico. In 1881, however, the westernmost pier and lodge of the arch structure were demolished to make way for offices, and soon afterwards a hotel extension blocked the view from Euston Road.

Following the First World War, the LNWR built a war memorial in the form of an obelisk on the entrance drive, designed to be in alignment with the arch and lodges. The war memorial survived the 1960s redevelopment and is a listed building.

== Removal ==
=== 1938 proposal ===
A suggestion to move the arch was made in 1938 by the London Midland & Scottish Railway (LMS), which proposed rebuilding Euston Station according to an American-inspired design by Percy Thomas, a respected architect hired with the help of a loan provided by the government. After returning from a tour of modern stations in the United States, Thomas proposed a large stripped-Classical block with wings, which incorporated a hotel, offices and the station. This plan involved removing the Euston Arch. Gerald Wellesley and Albert Richardson of the Georgian Group, a conservation organisation, managed to persuade Lord Stamp, chairman of the LMS, that it could be resited on the Euston Road, even though Thomas had insisted that it would not be possible to move it. Ultimately these plans for reconstruction were never realised as the Second World War began the following year.

=== 1960 proposal ===
In January 1960 the British Transport Commission served the London County Council (LCC) (the local planning authority) with notice of its intention to demolish Euston station.

Conceived in the context of the BTC's plans to upgrade and electrify the main line between Euston and Scotland as part of its Modernisation Programme, the proposal called for the demolition of the entire station, including the arch and the Great Hall, which were both Grade II listed buildings. The existing station was regarded as inconveniently sited and impractically small.

At a planning inquiry held in late January 1960, the LCC adopted a report by its Town Planning Committee which allowed the removal of the arch and its attendant lodges on condition that they would be "re-erected on another site in an appropriate dignified and open setting." Giving evidence to the LCC, the BTC estimated that the re-siting costs would be in the region of £180,000. It refused to countenance any suggestion that it would fund the work. In the House of Commons, the MP Woodrow Wyatt tabled a motion demanding that the arch as well as the Great Hall and Shareholders' Room in the station should be retained.

Under the legislation governing the planning procedure, once the BTC's notice to demolish had expired on 17 April 1960, only the Minister of Housing and Local Government could save the buildings by placing a preservation order on them. In default of the minister's action, the station would be demolished.

=== Royal Fine Art Commission ===
In 1960 the Royal Fine Art Commission, the body responsible for advising on questions of "public amenity or of artistic importance", asked both the BTC and the LCC to consult it. Local planning authorities are 'advised' to seek the commission's advice on development schemes of national or major regional importance, and the commission will make non-binding recommendations as to the proposed development from the perspective of its impact on the local environment and its design quality. The BTC referred the commission to the LCC which itself avoided the issue by stating that it was for the Ministry of Housing and Local Government to call-in the planning application. The ministry refused to act, stating that it still remained for the LCC to deal with the application.

In May 1960 Henry Brooke, the Conservative Minister for Housing and Local Government, was asked to issue a building preservation order in respect of the arch under Section 29 of the Town and Country Planning Act 1947. This would prevent any works being carried out without the permission of the LCC. He rejected the request, believing that an order was unnecessary given that the LCC was in discussions with the BTC on the future of the arch. The Royal Fine Art Commission contacted the minister in June 1960 expressing their concern for the arch, and again requested to be consulted on the proposals for redevelopment of the station site. The minister did not reply to this letter.

=== Decision ===
On 12 July 1961, in a written answer to a parliamentary question by Sir Frank Markham, the Minister of Transport, Ernest Marples, confirmed that he had given approval to the early reconstruction of Euston station which, in his view, was urgent not only because of the electrification programme but also because three 50-year-old Underground lifts had almost reached the end of their useful lives. The replacement of the lifts would cost £700,000. As he recounted:

The possibility of moving the Doric arch to another part of the site has also been examined by the [BTC] and by the expert advisers to the Minister of Works. They estimate that the cost of dismantling and re-erecting the arch alone without its flanking lodges, would be about £190,000, compared with £12,000 for simple demolition. The arch weighs about 4,500 tons, and to brace it and remove it on rollers would cost even more.

The arch did not, in his view, justify such expenditure, and although he expressed his regret at the passing of a major monument of the early railway age, there was no practical alternative in his mind.

=== Reaction and last-minute lobbying ===
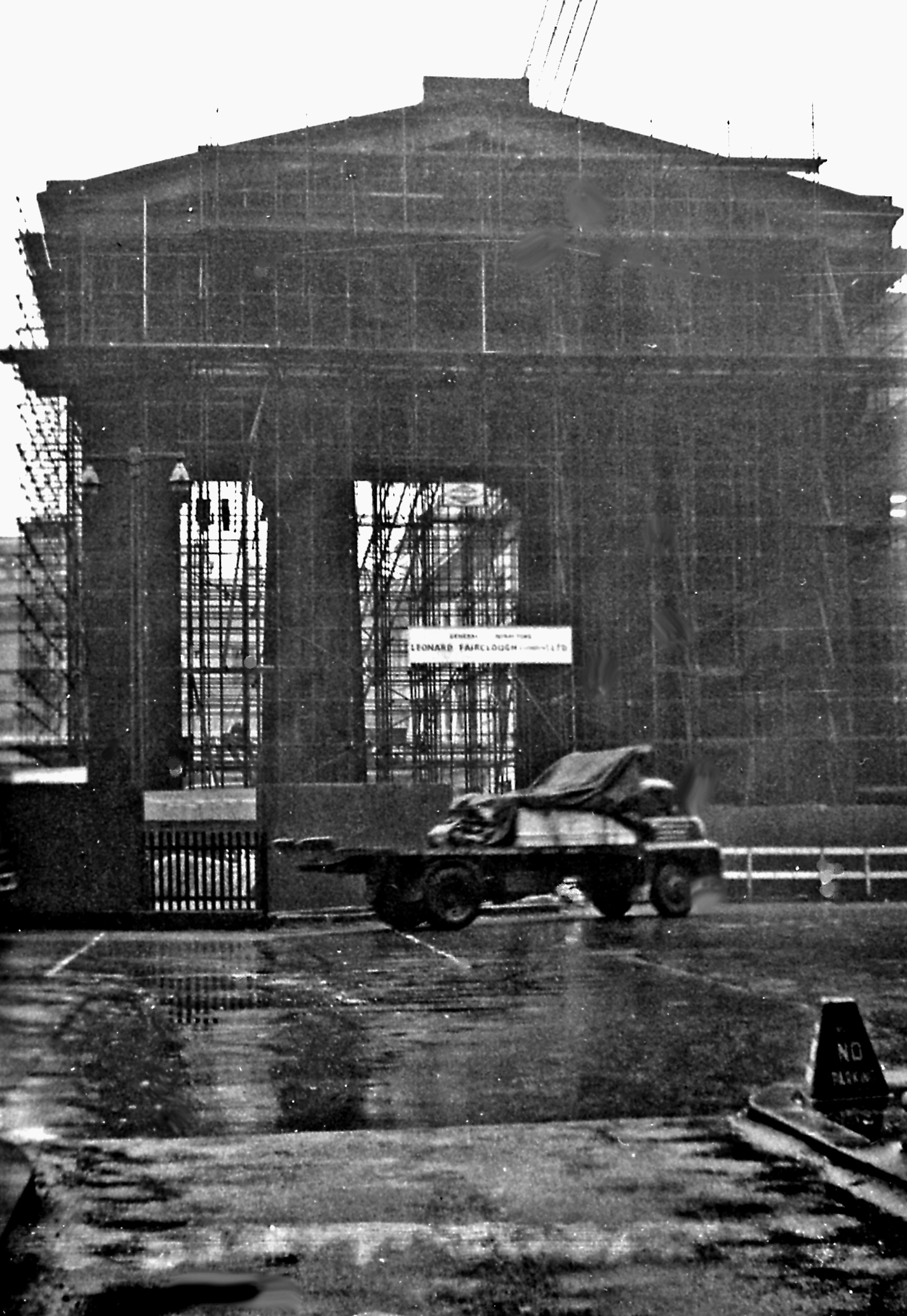
The breakers moved in on 6 November 1961. This photograph was taken on a wet 12 February 1962.

The arch's imminent demolition sparked a preservation protest in which Woodrow Wyatt, John Betjeman and Nikolaus Pevsner were prominent figures, and a wider debate about the modernisation of central London. There was public disquiet over how a local authority with a good track record for architecture and town planning such as the LCC, and the BTC, an important public service operator, could allow the demolition of such an important monument. Figures such as Sir Charles Wheeler, the President of the Royal Academy, backed by the Society for the Protection of Ancient Buildings, the Georgian Group and the London Society, lobbied in vain for the arch's preservation. Arguments which had been successfully employed to see off the previous attempted demolition in 1938 failed to sway the BTC which said that it was unable to afford the costs of reconstruction.

The Victorian Society, whose vice-chairman was Sir John Betjeman, attempted to raise £90,000 to pay for the relocation of the arch, and pleaded for a stay of execution for the arch until this had been done. A Canadian firm, Nicholas Brothers, had offered to move the portico on rollers to a site 200 yards nearer the Euston Road. It was reported in October 1961 that a promise had been received that the gates of the arch would be preserved and moved elsewhere on the railways.

On 24 October 1961, a group of campaigners including J. M. Richards, the editor of the Architectural Review, went to see Harold Macmillan, the Conservative Prime Minister, to plead for the preservation of the arch, arguing that if it really had to be moved, that it should be dismantled and re-erected elsewhere. As J. M. Richards recalled, "Macmillan listened – or I suppose he listened [...] he sat without moving with his eyes apparently closed. He asked no questions; in fact he said nothing except that he would consider the matter."

Two weeks later Macmillan gave his response to the proposals. He stated that he had decided against adopting the suggested preservation strategy and said that "every possible way" of preserving the arch had been investigated by the BTC, but the lack of available land, the operational requirements of the station and the removal costs entailed made the project infeasible. He revealed that the only place the arch could be put where it would not look "incongruous" was the traffic roundabout on the Euston Road, a possibility which had been considered unsuitable by the LCC. He refused to allow any further delay or to allow the Victorian Society time to raise funds, for that would delay the reconstruction of the station and involve extra expenditure of £100,000.

=== Demolition ===
Demolition began in December 1961. Leonard Fairclough Limited of Adlington in Lancashire were appointed as demolition contractors. The company revealed that it would take several weeks to demolish the arch, as the job would have to be done by hand – explosives being out of the question owing to possible damage to the adjacent buildings.

=== Criticism ===
The Architectural Review criticised the cynical means employed by British Railways in achieving the demolition of the arch:

Its destruction is wanton and unnecessary – connived at by the British Transport Commission, its guardians, and by the London County Council and the Government, who are jointly responsible for safeguarding London's major architectural monuments, of which this is undoubtedly one. In spite of [...] being one of the outstanding architectural creations of the early nineteenth century and the most important – and visually satisfying – monument to the railway age which Britain pioneered, the united efforts of many organisations and individuals failed to save it in the face of official apathy and philistinism.

Frank Valori, a representative of Leonard Fairclough Ltd., later revealed to Lord Esher that he had undertaken the demolition "without pleasure" and had offered to provide the government with an alternative site at his own expense at which he would store the stones of the portico with a view to re-erecting it elsewhere. This offer was "disdainfully rejected by the Government on the flimsy pretext that no place could ever be found." Valori presented a silver model of the arch to Lord Esher who admitted that the gesture "made him feel as if some man had murdered his wife and then presented him with her bust". Valori later incorporated part of the arch into the stonework of the house which he had constructed for himself in Bromley.

The campaign to preserve the arch was a significant factor in the development of industrial archaeology as a distinct discipline.

== Remains of the arch ==
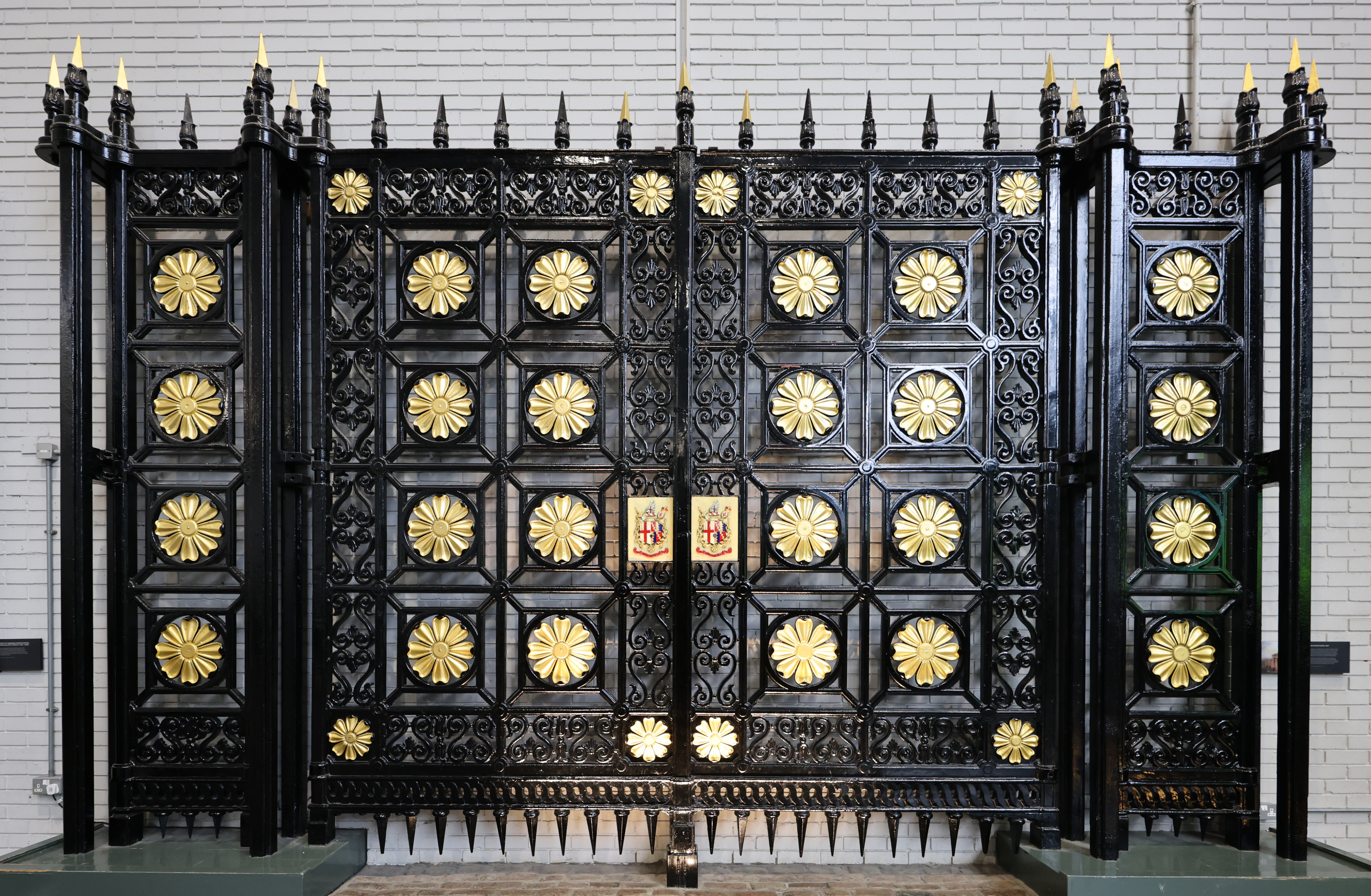
The main gates from the Euston Arch, now in the care of the National Railway Museum, York

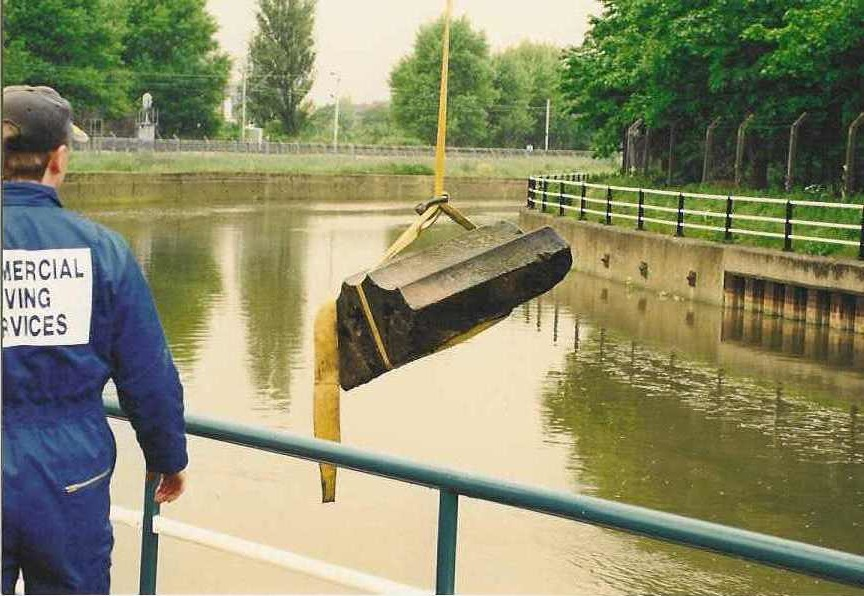
A part of one of the columns is recovered from the Prescott Channel in 1994

The ornamental iron gates from the arch were saved at the time of demolition and are now in the National Railway Museum in York.

In 1994 the historian Dan Cruickshank discovered that at least 60% of the stone from the arch was buried in the bed of the River Lea at the Prescott Channel in the East End of London. The location of the stones, for which he had been searching for 15 years, had been revealed by Bob Cotton, a British Waterways engineer, who had acquired the material in 1962 to fill a chasm in the bed of the channel.

Cruickshank revealed on the One Foot in the Past television programme, broadcast on 7 June 1994, that the stone had barely weathered at all. As he explained, "This makes the reconstruction of the arch a tangible reality, ... The arch is made of stone from the Bramley Fall quarry in Yorkshire which is incredibly hard, almost like granite." A section of fluted column was brought up from the river bed, where the stones with "Euston" marked in gold lettering are believed to be located. Other stones are lying in the gardens of those involved in the arch's demolition. The television programme showed at least one large piece being part of the rear wall of a large rockery in one garden.

In May 2009 British Waterways raised many more stones from the Prescott Channel, in conjunction with work to repair waterways serving the Olympic Park.

A Fuller's pub in the new station, named The Doric Arch after Euston arch, has a display of some of the recovered stone behind the bar.

== Reconstruction plans ==
In 1996 Dan Cruickshank launched the Euston Arch Trust, an organisation dedicated to the rebuilding of the arch, which counted among its members the modernist architects Peter Smithson (who with his wife Alison had written a history of the arch) and Piers Gough. The trustees saw the opportunity to put right a historical wrong whilst at the same time addressing the fragmented townscape around Euston, including possibly the restoration of Euston Square which was laid out in the early nineteenth century but fell victim to the redevelopment of Euston Station in 1968. Railtrack were reported to be 'keen' on the idea of reconstructing the arch and the London Borough of Camden were said to have 'no case against revival'. The estimated cost of rebuilding in 1996 was said to be £5 million.

On 6 November 2007 the historian Tristram Hunt reported in The Guardian newspaper that a project to rebuild the arch as part of the redevelopment of Euston Station could be led by Alastair Lansley, the lead architect for the reconstruction and rebuilding of St Pancras Station.

On 18 February 2008 Marcus Binney reported in The Times newspaper that the arch may be rebuilt as part of the redevelopment of Euston Station from 2009.

In September 2009 the Euston Arch Trust revealed detailed plans to rebuild the arch in front of Euston Station, between a pair of existing lodges on Euston Road. It was reported that lettable space in the arch could help pay the cost of construction, now estimated at £10 million. The trust suggests this might involve a 'banqueting room' at the top of the arch and a 'nightclub' in the basement.

In March 2014 it was announced that a revived £1.2bn scheme to rebuild London's Euston station as the gateway to the High Speed 2 line might include reconstruction of the Euston Arch. The Transport Secretary Patrick McLoughlin said: "I will ... ask HS2 Ltd and Network Rail to develop more comprehensive proposals for the redevelopment of Euston, working with the rail industry and the local community. This work should include proposals for the Euston arch, which should never have been knocked down and which I would like to see rebuilt." In November 2016, the then Minister of State for Transport, John Hayes, also supported reconstruction of the Euston Arch, saying "We will make good the terrible damage that was done to Euston, by resurrecting the Euston Arch." Uncertainty about the future of HS2 nonetheless raised doubts about the reconstruction of the arch. While the plan remained for the line to run to Euston, the redevelopment of the station was delayed in October 2023.

== Legacy ==
The demolition of the arch inspired the artist Tom Eckersley to design a tile motif at Euston Underground station displaying the arch for the new Victoria line, which was opened in 1968, shortly afterwards. The motif shows the arch in black and red on a red background.

== See also ==
- List of demolished buildings and structures in London
