= Christ Church, Adlington =

Coordinates: 53.6137°N 2.6043°W

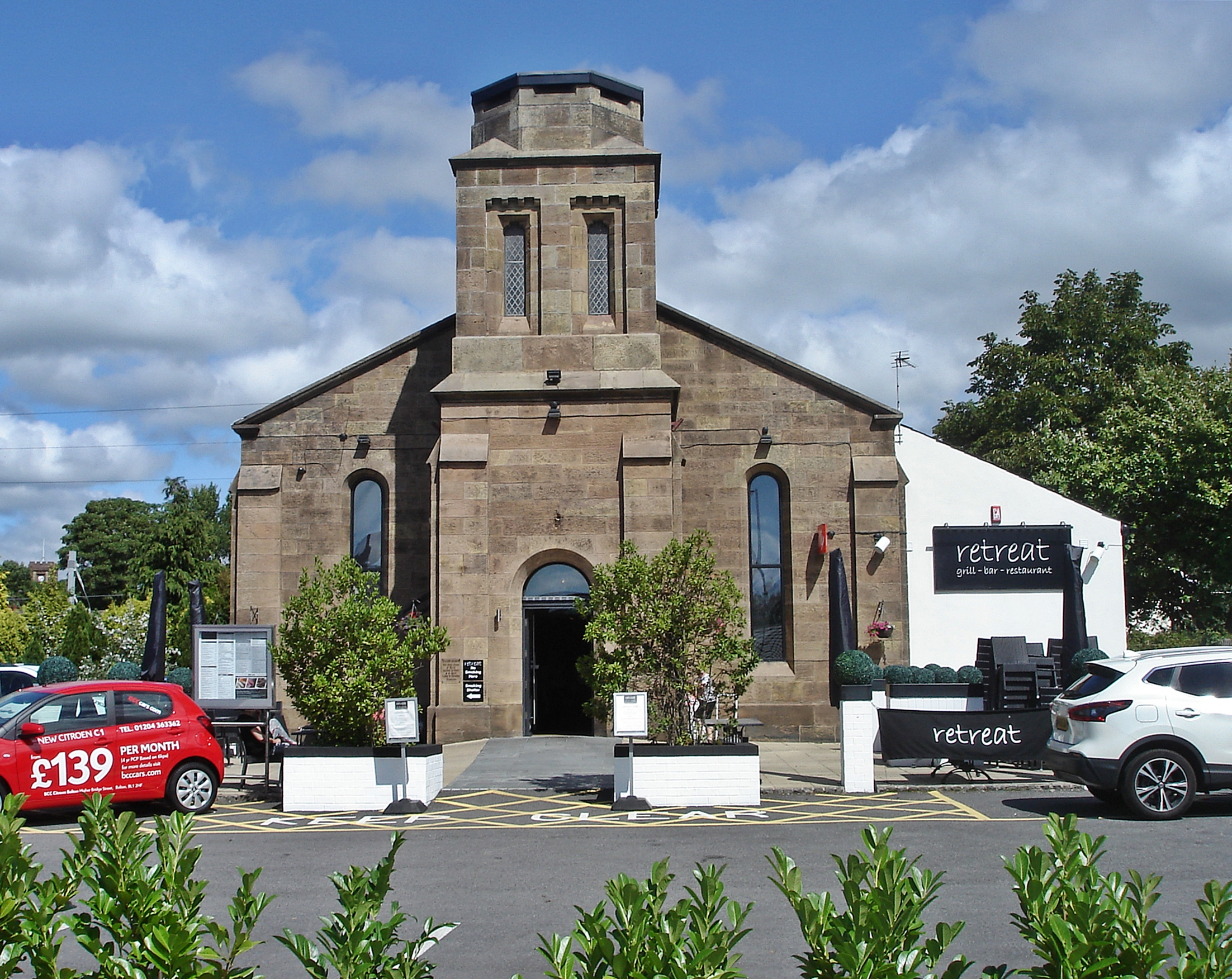
- Western aspect (2018)

- Location in the Borough of Chorley
- OS grid reference: SD 601 132
- Location: Church Street, Adlington, Lancashire
- Country: England
- Denomination: Anglican

Architecture
- Functional status: Redundant
- Heritage designation: Grade II
- Designated: 21 February 1984
- Architect: Edward Welch
- Architectural type: Church
- Style: Neo-Norman
- Groundbreaking: 1838
- Completed: 1839
- Construction cost: £1,560
- Closed: 1 November 1980

Specifications
- Materials: Ashlar, slate roof

Christ Church is on Church Street, Adlington, Lancashire, England. It is a redundant Anglican church, and is recorded in the National Heritage List for England as a designated Grade II listed building.

== History ==
Christ Church was built in 1838–39, and designed by Edward Welch. It was a Commissioners' Church, having received a grant towards its construction from the Church Building Commission. The total cost of the church was £1,560 (equivalent to £140,000 in 2025) towards which a grant of £400 was given. When St Paul's Church was built on a different site in the town in 1884, Christ Church became its chapel of ease. Christ Church was declared redundant on 1 November 1980, and on 7 April 1982 it was approved for use as an office or for shopping. As of 2013, it is in use as a restaurant.

== Architecture ==
The church is in Neo-Norman style. It is built in ashlar stone with a slate roof. The church consists of a six-bay nave and a short chancel under one roof. At the west end is a two-stage tower. In the bottom stage of the tower are angle pilaster buttresses and a round-headed west door. The second stage contains two lancet windows on three of its sides, and above this is an octagonal drum. There was originally a spire, but this has been removed. Along the sides of the nave are pilaster buttresses and round-headed lancet windows. The east window consists of five stepped lancets. On the south side of the chancel is a priest's door. The interior has been altered, but three panelled galleries have been retained.

== See also ==
- List of Commissioners' churches in Northeast and Northwest England
- Listed buildings in Adlington, Lancashire
