= Chehaw Park =

Park and zoo in Albany, Georgia, U.S.

- Interactive map of Chehaw Park
- 31.6176238°N 84.1381014°W
- Location: 105 Chehaw Park Road; Albany, Georgia, United States
- Land area: 800 acres (320 ha) (Zoo portion is 100 acres (40 ha) only)
- No. of animals: 212
- No. of species: 55
- Owner: Chehaw Park Authority (City of Albany)
- Website: www.chehaw.org

Chehaw Park is a park and zoo located in Albany, Georgia. The park was originally opened as Chehaw State Park in 1937, and currently covers 800 acres (320 ha). The Wild Animal Park was designed by naturalist Jim Fowler of television's Wild Kingdom. Fowler is originally from Albany, Georgia. It was opened in 1997, and features boardwalks in the cypress swamps that take visitors through natural habitat exhibits.

Chehaw was an accredited member of the Association of Zoos and Aquariums (AZA) from 1997 to 2018. It was previously one of only two accredited zoos in the state of Georgia.

== History ==
Originally developed as Chehaw State Park in 1937, the property consisted of 586 acres (237 ha) donated to the state of Georgia by private landowners in Albany, Georgia. It is enclosed on two sides by a large, clear water bayou formed where the Kinchafoonee Creek and Muckalee Creeks meet. The property has expanded to nearly 800 acres (320 ha) and consists of moss-covered subtropical cypress swamps, climax hardwood forests, and burn-controlled pine/wiregrass habitat.

The park is named for the Chiha, or Chehaw, a tribe of Creek Native Americans who inhabited around the property and befriended Caucasian settlers. Artifacts such as arrowheads, spearheads, tomahawks, hoes, drill, scrapers, clay pipes and stone celts were commonly found during original park development. Variations in artifact design show land use by distinctly different tribes over several hundreds of years.

In 1974, the city of Albany leased 100 acres (40 ha) of unused land in Chehaw Park from the state of Georgia to develop a wild animal park where exotic and indigenous animals would be displayed in their natural habitats. With the inception of the wild animal habitat, the State donated the entire Chehaw Park acreage to the city to further develop. Albany and the Chehaw Wildlife Society commissioned Jim Fowler and WT Hill to design and supervise the construction of the wildlife area. The original animals were moved from the Tift Park Zoo in Albany to their new home at Chehaw between 1975 and 1977, all animals were moved five miles by truck except for the largest female Asian elephant in the US. WT Hill walked her five miles. With one chain around her foot, she walked side by side with him to her new much much nicer home at the park. and the Chehaw Wild Animal Park was officially dedicated and opened to the public in October 1977.

In 1979, the state of Georgia created the Chehaw Park Authority, an agent charged with the governing, preserving and developing the property as a natural and public resource for southwest Georgia. Park officials brought back the park's original designer, Jim Fowler, in 2004 to begin lending his expertise the development of the Wild Animal Park. At the same time, new exhibits were created for African black rhinoceros (opened in April 2005) and African lesser flamingos (opened in 2006). The park also retained the services of Atlanta design firm MACTEC Engineering to develop the first site management plan for the entire park.

Between 1997 and 2002, Chehaw began to examine other park venues including the construction of the two-million dollar Creekside Education Center, the Children's Play Park and a nationally sanctioned BMX bike track. Additional infrastructure construction included: animal quarantine, veterinary hospital, Savannah Café, bathrooms, reptile house and ticket booth.

== Exhibits ==
Chehaw is home to many endangered or vanishing species, including the red wolf, south-central black rhinoceros, cheetah, black-and-white colobus monkeys, four species of lemurs, bongos, duiker, Grant's zebras, black bears, American bison, bobcat, Bactrian camel, several species of antelope, and unique birds (ibis, flamingos, grey crowned cranes, ostriches, bald eagles, and turaco). These exhibits are accessed through a boardwalk in the swamp area. The zoo also provides a home to native species such as fox, squirrels, beavers, bobcats, gopher tortoises, and white-tailed deer.

The park also contains the following special attractions.

- Ben's Barnyard: the petting zoo includes an interactive portion where visitors can see how they would fare next to wild animals. Zoo visitors can climb into a bald eagle's "nest", take a giant leap from a standstill into a sandpit, jump as far up as they can, and measure their "wing" span.
- Alligator's Outpost: a boardwalk leads visitors to a swamp where dozens of American alligators live. Unlike most zoo exhibits, this one is a natural habitat where the challenge is to see how many eyes visitors can spy emerging from the waters. Zoo visitors can also feed the alligators on the weekends.
- Wiregrass Express: the zoo's train, which runs through the pine/wiregrass restoration area. Visitors can take a 20-minute ride on this train during the months of March through December.
- African Veldt: runs March through November and takes guests out on safari in a covered trailer. During the ride, guests will see several different species of antelope, zebra, wildebeest, ostrich, eland, and impala. The animals roam and herd freely in this 40 acre exhibit.

== Other facilities ==
The parks also includes nature trails, BMX trails, an 18-hole disc golf course, BMX bike racing, campgrounds, a RV park, and a playground.

== Gallery ==
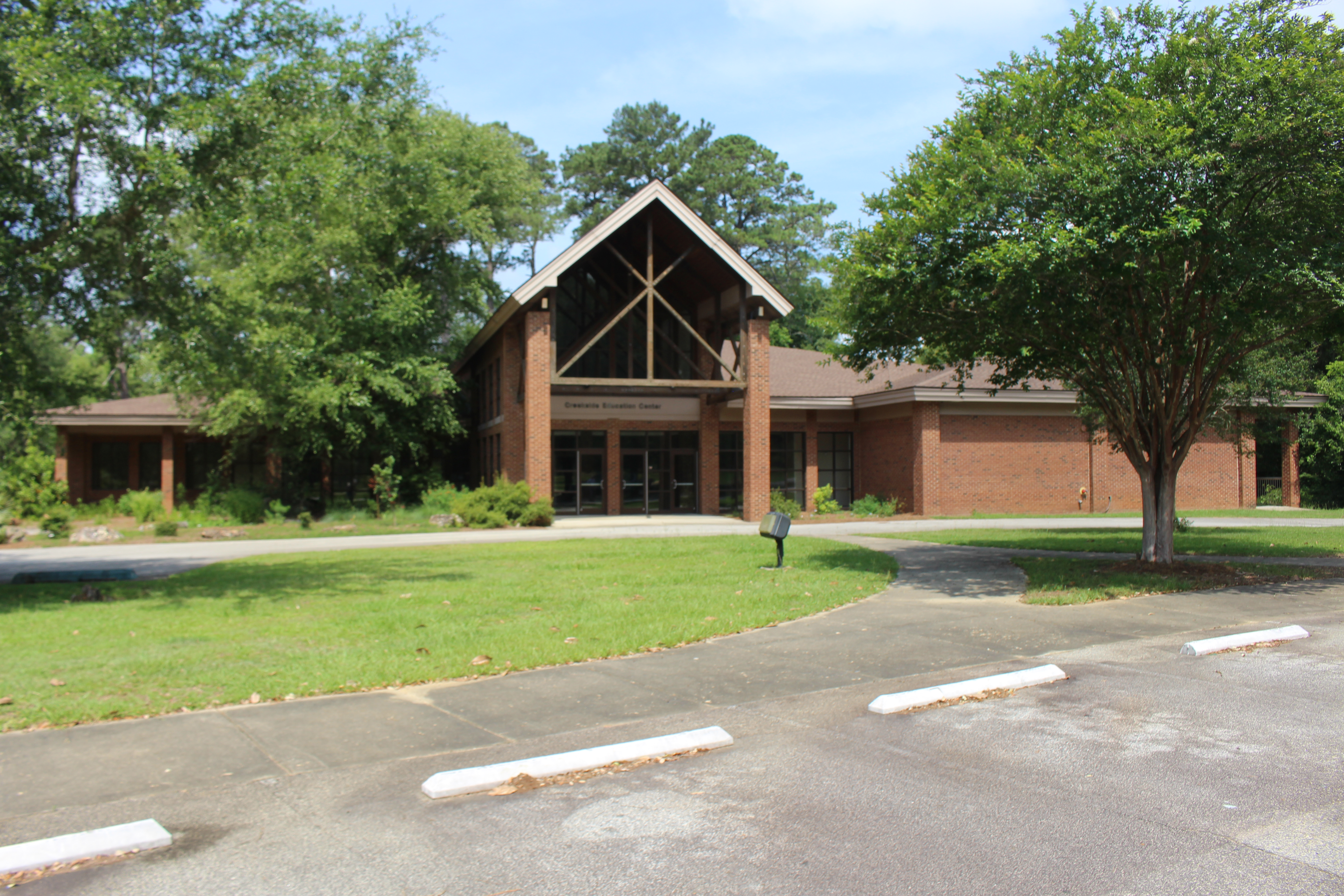
Creekside Education Center

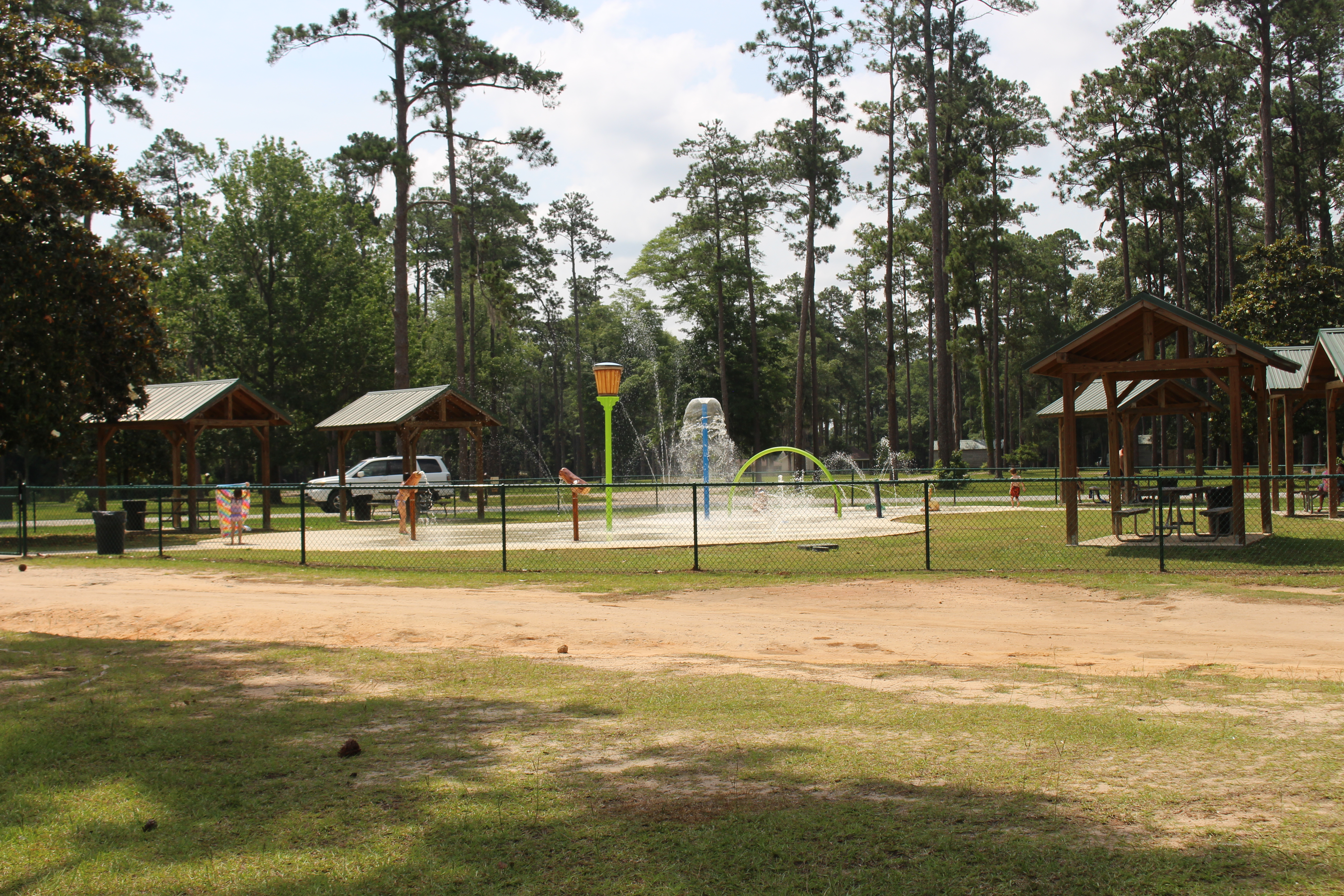
Splash Pad

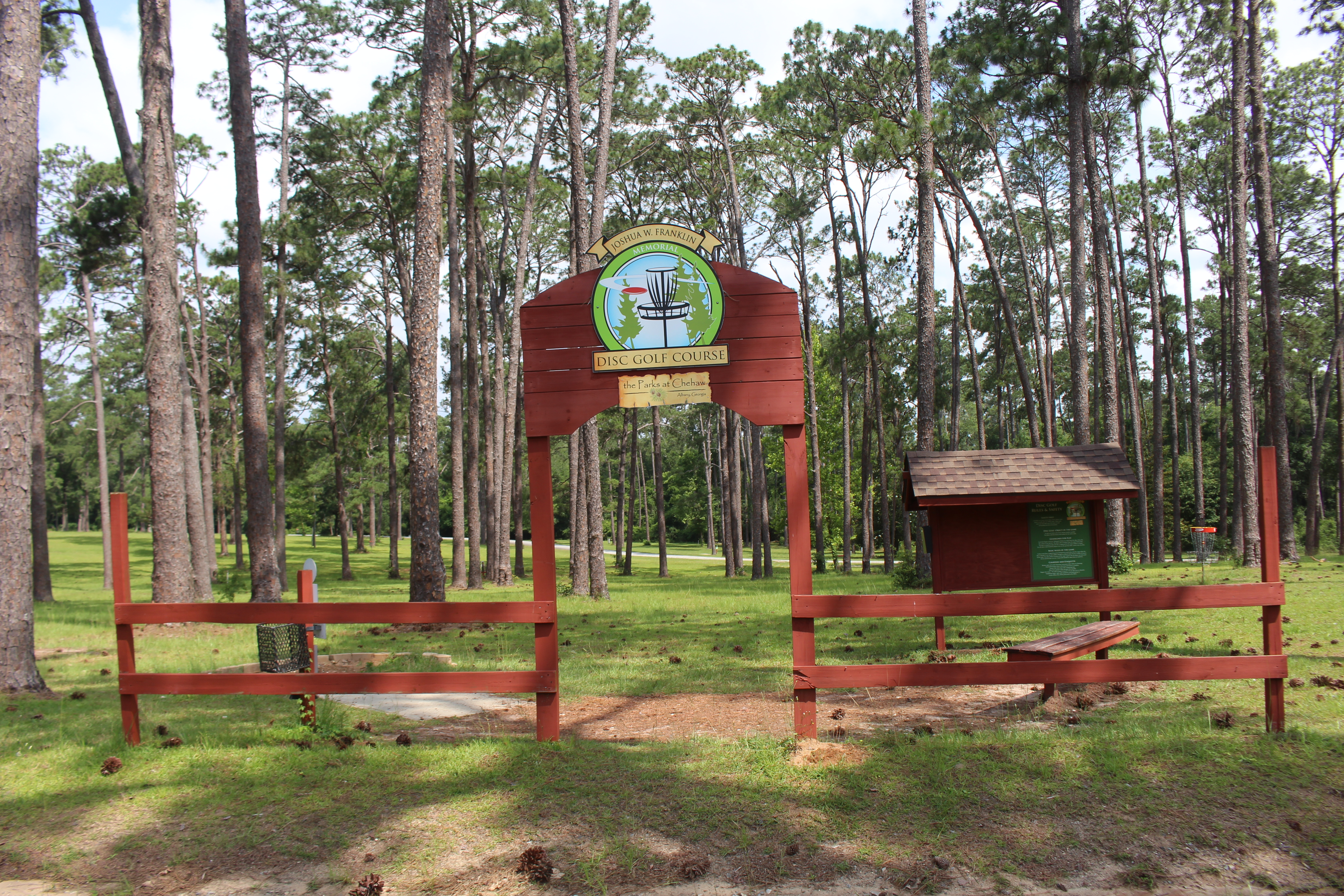
Disc Golf

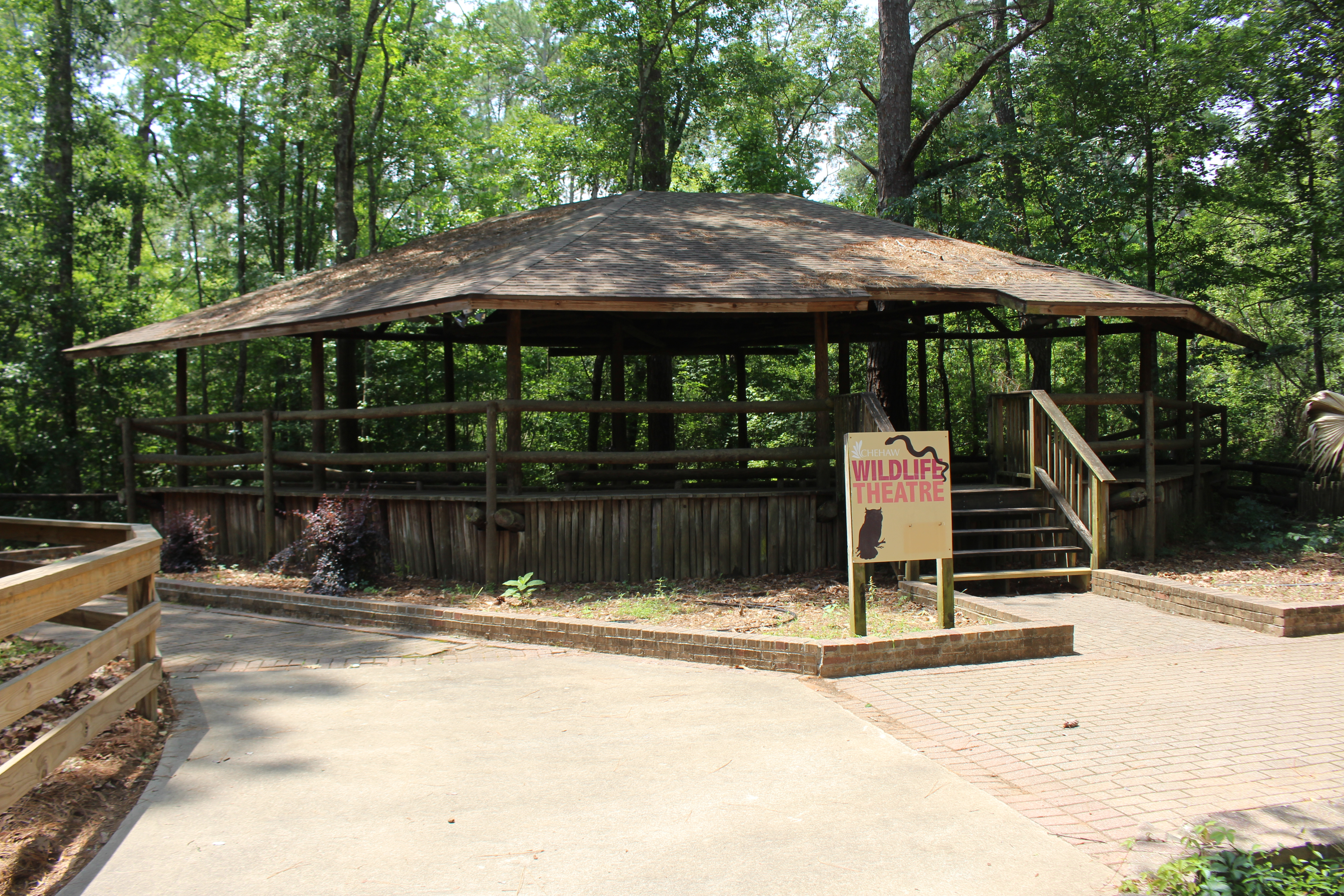
Wildlife Theatre

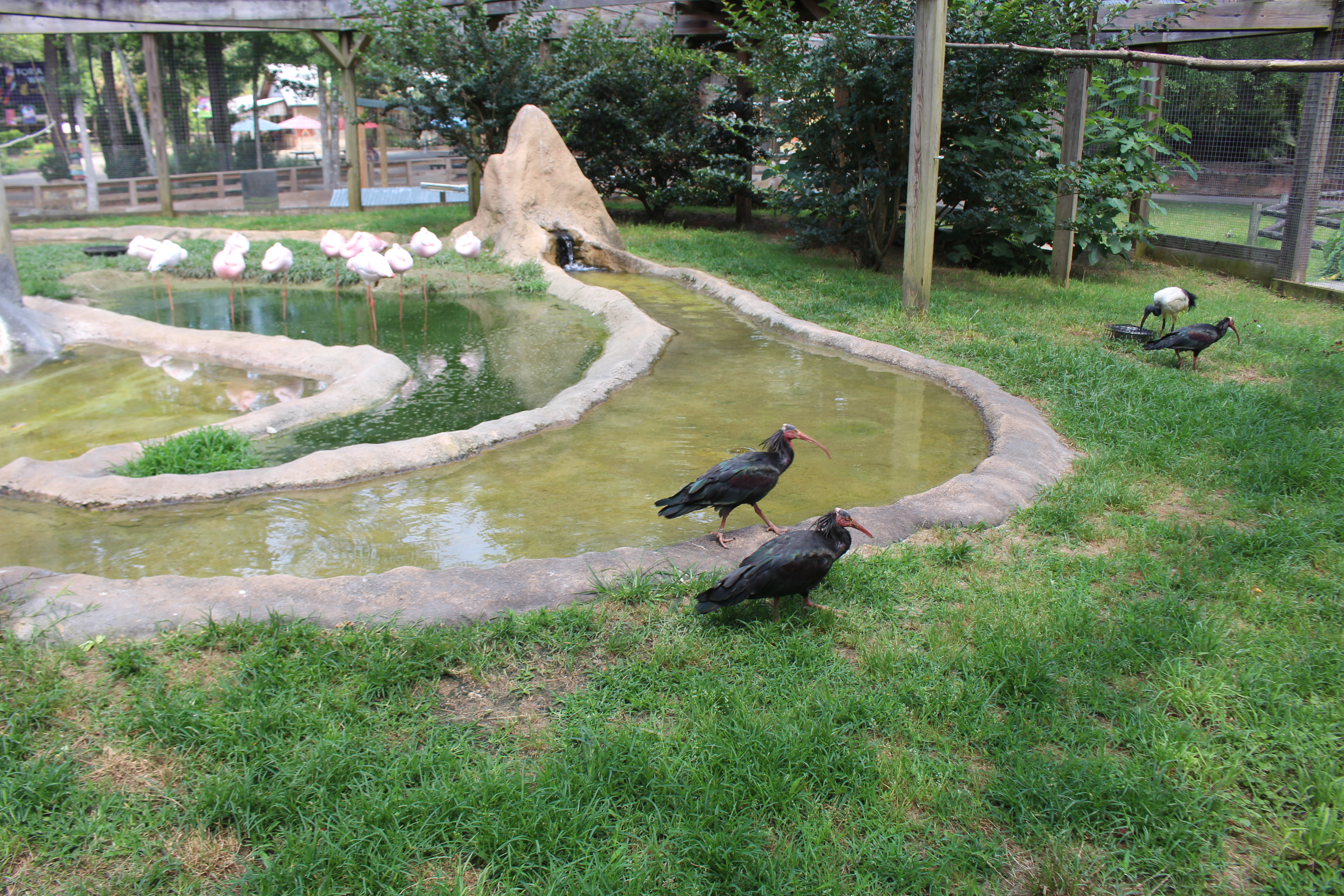
Ibis and Flaminos
