= Adlington Hall, Lancashire =

Country house in Lancashire, England

Adlington Hall
- Location within the Borough of Chorley

General information
- Status: Demolished
- Location: Adlington, Lancashire, England
- Coordinates: 53.6067°N 2.6267°W
- Completed: 1771
- Demolished: 1960s

Technical details
- Material: Red brick and stone
- Floor count: 2

Adlington Hall was a Georgian country house, now demolished, in Adlington, Lancashire, England, between Wigan and Chorley.

The house was constructed in 1771 of red brick and stone on rising ground. It consisted of two storeys, having a seven-bay frontage with a central three-bay pediment.

== History ==
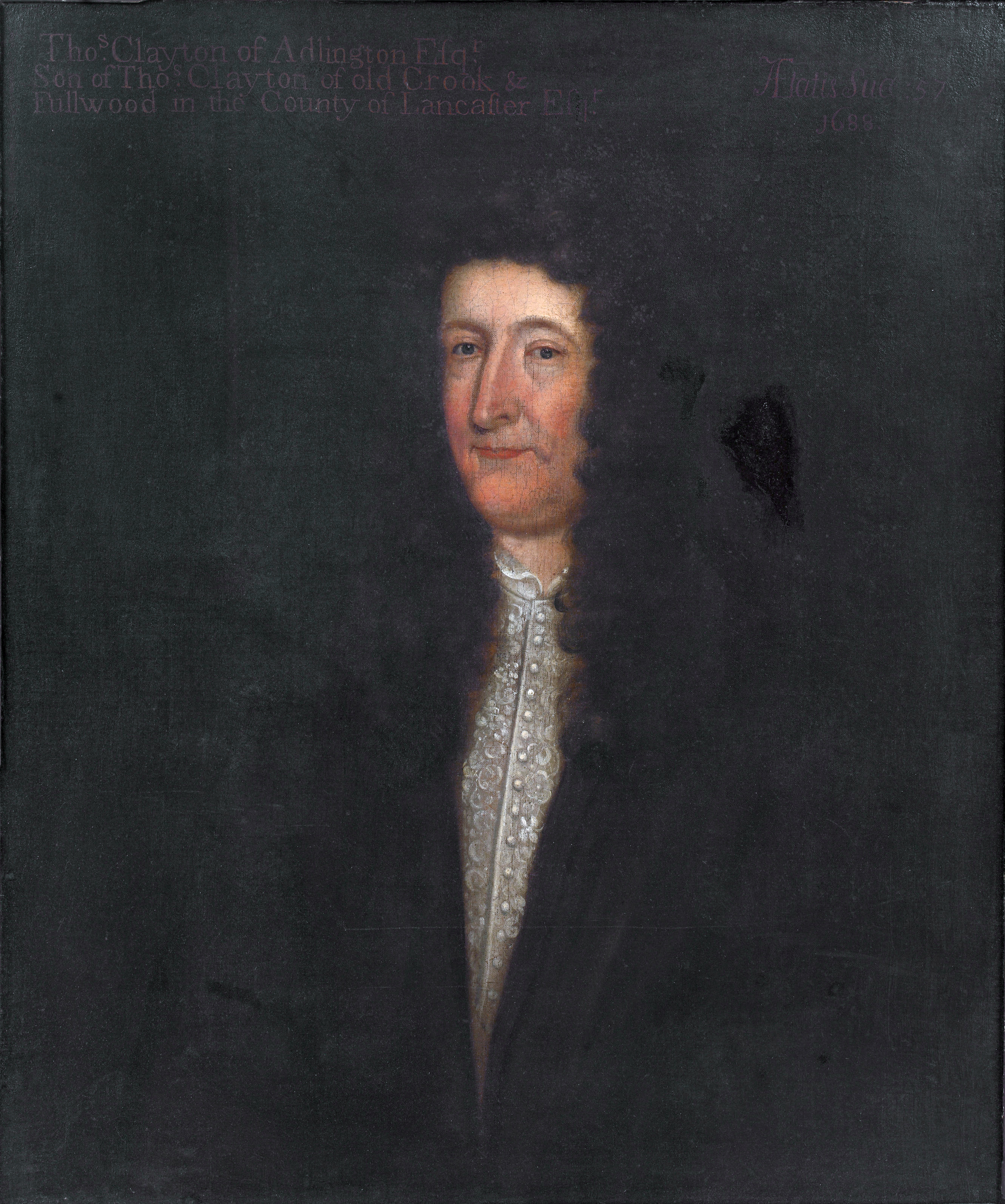
Thomas Clayton of Adlington, aged 57 (1688)

The Adlington manor estate previously belonged to the Adlington family. On the death of Peter Adlington it was sold in 1688 to Thomas Clayton.

Thomas Clayton died in 1722 and the estate descended to his grandson Richard Clayton, who was MP and Recorder for Wigan and Chief Justice of Common Pleas in Ireland. On the latter's death in 1770 it passed to his nephew, Sir Richard Clayton, the consul at Nantes, who was created a baronet in 1774. Sir Richard built the present Georgian style house in 1771 to replace an ancient timber and plaster house on the same site.

Sir Richard died in 1828 and the estate was inherited by his daughter Henrietta, who had married General Robert Browne. He assumed the Clayton name in addition to his own. Their son, Richard Clayton Browne-Clayton, died in November 1886. His only son died at Sevastopol and Adlington Hall passed to James Robert Browne Clayton Dawbeny.

After the Claytons the hall was occupied in turn by John Gerrard, a cotton manufacturer and Benjamin Davies, owner of the Huyton Bleachworks.

In 1921 the hall and 129 acres of land were bought by Wigan Corporation to protect the town's water supply, as it was adjacent to the existing water catchment area. During the 1930s the family of Monks-Gaskell lived at the hall and during the Second World War it was used to house Spanish soldiers who had fled to England after the Spanish Civil War.

The hall was demolished in the 1960s and the site is now occupied by a poultry farm. Two lodges and the entrance pillars originally survived, but one lodge has since been replaced by a modern house.
