= BCI Engineers & Scientists =

BCI Engineers & Scientists, Incorporated
- Type: Defunct
- Industry: Engineering
- Founded: 1977; 49 years ago
- Defunct: February 2, 2011; 15 years ago
- Fate: Acquired by Amec Foster Wheeler
- Headquarters: Lakeland, Florida
- Key people: Richard M. Powers, President

BCI Engineers & Scientists, Inc. was an engineering/geology consulting company specializing in the water and mining sectors. It was based in Lakeland, Florida and had offices in Orlando, Minneola, Jupiter, Florida, as well as Howell, Michigan. In 2011, Amec Foster Wheeler acquired the company for $20 million.

BCI's founder Dr. Leslie Bromwell was a consultant and team leader for the restoration and preservation of the Herbert Hoover Dike, which surrounds Florida's Lake Okeechobee.
