= John Christopher Bradshaw =

New Zealand organist, conductor, choirmaster and university professor (1876–1950)

John Christopher Bradshaw (23 June 1876–16 January 1950) was a New Zealand organist, conductor, choirmaster and university professor.

== Biography ==
Bradshaw was born in Adlington, Lancashire, England on 23 June 1876. He was a pupil of James Kendrick Pyne at the Royal Manchester College of Music. In 1902 Bradshaw was appointed organist at the Anglican cathedral in Christchurch. There, he founded the Christchurch Male Voice Choir. Bradshaw was lecturer at Canterbury College and dean of the Faculty of Music.
