= Dick Clayton =

Dick Clayton may refer to:

- Dick Clayton, character in Worst Week played by Kurtwood Smith
- Dick Clayton, 1958 winner of the Purdue Grand Prix
- Dick Clayton, radio host of WIP-AM

== See also ==
- Richard Clayton (disambiguation)
