= List of King George V Playing Fields in Lancashire =

Lancashire
Location	Formal name	Local name (if any)	National Grid Reference	Dates		External links
Location	Formal name	Local name (if any)	National Grid Reference	Purchase	Opening	External links
Adlington	King George's Field	n/a	SD605138		1937	Recreation in Adlington
Gorton	King George V Playing Field	Peter Pan Park	SJ887967			Park info
Newburgh	King George's Field	n/a	SD481099			Recreation in Newburgh
Penwortham	King George V Playing Field	n/a	SD515288			
Skerton	King George's Field	n/a	SD474634			Skerton, from "This is Lancashire" archive for 20 February 1997
