= Ellerbeck Colliery =

Coal mine in Lancashire, England

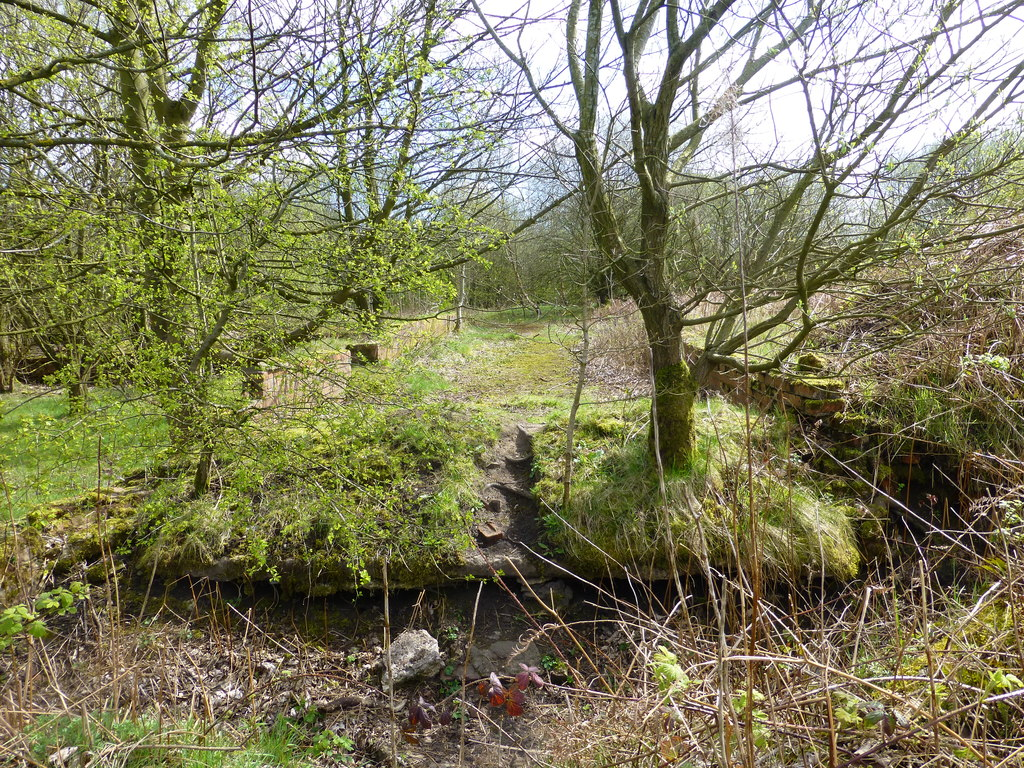
- Ruins of Ellerbeck Colliery Training School (2014)

- Former location in the Borough of Chorley
- Location: Chorley, Lancashire, England; 53°37′08″N 2°37′47″W
- Products: Coal
- Production: 30,000 tons
- Financial year: 1940
- Opened: 1876
- Closed: 1965

Ellerbeck Colliery was a coal mine located on the border of Coppull and Adlington in the Borough of Chorley in Lancashire, England. The Hilton House and Red Moss Coal Company sank the first shaft in 1876 and the colliery closed in 1928.

In 1896 Ellerbeck employed 460 underground workers and 148 on the surface. In 1923 Ellerbeck Nos. 1 & 2 pits had expanded to employ 892 underground workers and 156 on the surface. Ten years later the colliery was owned by the Blackrod Colliery Company and the pit employed 50 underground and 22 surface workers mining the Bone, Wigan Six Feet and New coal seams. The colliery was nationalised in 1947 becoming part of the National Coal Board and was redeveloped employing 411 men in 1958 before finally closing in 1965.

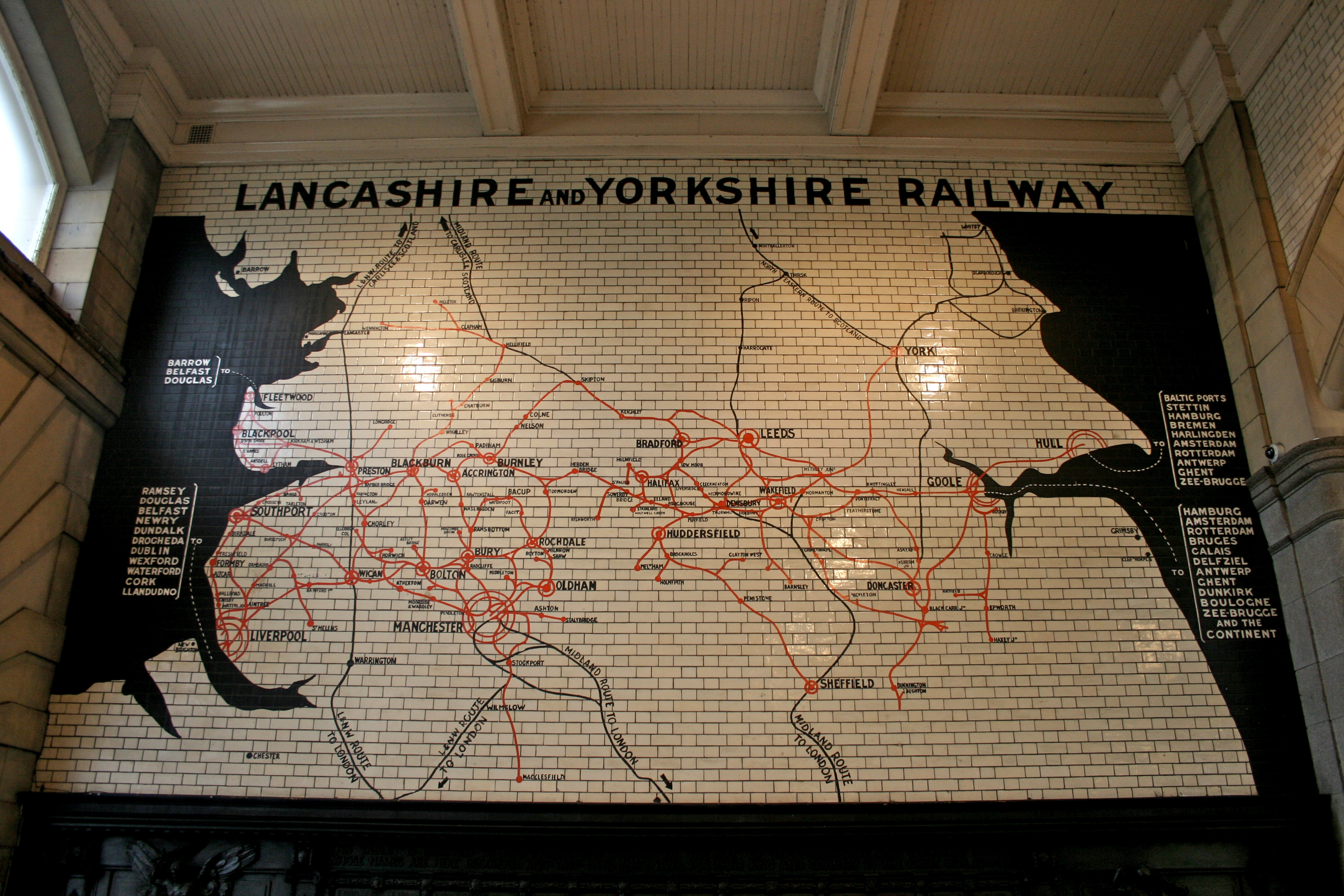
Route map of the L&Y network showing Ellerbeck Colliery.

The colliery was served by a branch line of the Lancashire Union Railway, remnants of which including the old bridge foundations on the Leeds-Liverpool Canal are evident today. The branch line was shared with neighbouring Duxbury Park Colliery. The colliery was so important to the Lancashire & Yorkshire Railway that, despite not being a passenger station, it appeared on their route maps,

== See also ==
- Glossary of coal mining terminology
