= Adlington, Lancashire =

Village and civil parish in Lancashire, England

Coordinates: 53.616546°N 2.598583°W

Adlington
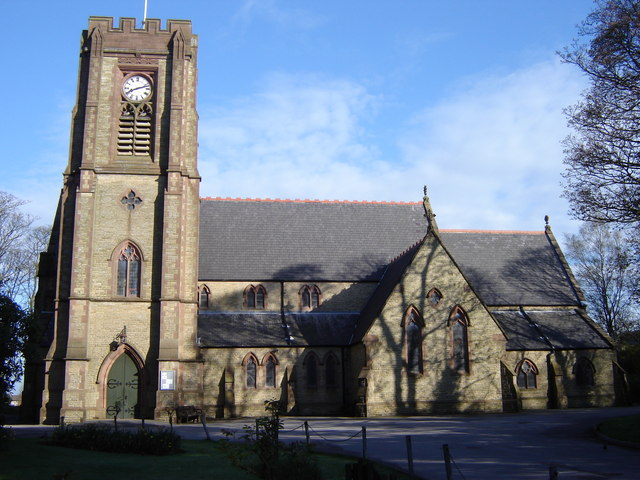
- St Paul's Parish Church

- Shown within Chorley Borough Location within Lancashire
- Population: 6,010 (2011)
- OS grid reference: SD605135
- Civil parish: Adlington
- District: Chorley
- Shire county: Lancashire
- Region: North West
- Country: England
- Sovereign state: United Kingdom
- Post town: CHORLEY
- Postcode district: PR6, PR7
- Dialling code: 01257
- Police: Lancashire
- Fire: Lancashire
- Ambulance: North West
- UK Parliament: Chorley

Adlington is a village and civil parish in the Borough of Chorley in Lancashire, England, near the West Pennine Moors. It is 3 miles (5 kilometres) south of Chorley. It became a separate parish in 1842 then grew into a township around the textile and coal mining industries until these closed in the 1960s. It had a population of 5,270 at the 2001 census, and risen to 6,010 at the 2011 census. The Leeds and Liverpool Canal runs through the village, where it holds White Bear Marina, the largest marina on the Canal.

== History ==
=== Toponymy ===
The last element 'ington' indicates that Adlington was an Anglo-Saxon settlement from about A.D. 650, while the first element is either a personal name, Eadwulf, or the aetheling or prince. Recorded spellings include, in 1190 Edeluinton, in 1202 Adelventon, in 1246 Adelinton and, in 1288 Adlington.

=== Manor ===
Adlington was part of the Penwortham barony granted to Randle de Marsey and later held by the Ferrers. In 1184 Hugh Gogard granted land to Cockersand Abbey. In 1202 Walter de Adlington granted six oxgangs of land to Siward de Duxbury. In 1230, Roger de Maresheya sold the township to the Earl of Chester. In 1288, Hugh de Adlington and Adam de Duxbury each held a moiety of the manor of William de Ferrers. The Duxbury portion was sold early in the 14th century and subdivided; several local families holding fractions. Land belonging to the St. Nicholas chantry in Standish Church was acquired by William Heaton, who died in 1619. John Pilkington, who had taken up arms for the king, but later took the side of Parliament in the civil war, had his estate sequestered.

In 1307, John Adlington paid rent to Sir Gilbert Standish. In 1374, Robert le Norreys of Burton quitclaimed his share to Hugh of Standish. In 1378, Sir Nicholas de Harrington held land subsequently held by Lord Ferrers of Groby and Thomas Harrington. There was a partition as some land was held of Lord Mounteagle, the Harringtons' successor.

In 1469, Hugh de Adlington gave the manor to his son, Robert who conveyed it to John Tarleton and Hugh Culcheth. Adlington fell in and out of the Adlington family ownership for over five centuries. Hugh Adlington died in 1525 holding messuages of Lord Mounteagle. His son Hugh died in 1556 holding the same estate which he left to his son John. Hugh Adlington died in 1640 holding the manor of Lord Morley and Mounteagle. His son Hugh was predeceased by his eldest son, John, who was killed fighting for the king at the Siege of Chester in 1644. Hugh was succeeded by Peter who had no surviving children and the manor descended to John's daughter Eleanor, who married Samuel Robinson of Chester in 1664.

Before 1700, the manor was bought by Thomas Clayton, who died in 1722. The estate descended to his grandson Richard Clayton and in 1770, to his nephew, Sir Richard, who was created a baronet in 1774 and built Adlington Hall in 1771. Richard, consul at Nantes, died in 1828 and was succeeded by his daughter Henrietta, wife of General Robert Browne, who assumed the Clayton name. Their son, Richard Clayton Browne Clayton, died in November 1886. His only son died at Sevastopol and Adlington Hall passed to James Robert Browne Clayton Dawbeny. Wigan council bought the 129-acre estate in 1921 to safeguard the village's water supply.

Adlington Hall, built on rising ground in 1771 by Sir Richard Clayton, was a Georgian mansion of brick and stone, and replaced an ancient timber and plaster house on the same site. It was demolished in the 1960s.

=== Industrial Revolution ===
Coal was mined in the area for centuries, first outcrops of coal and bell pits and then deeper shafts to the Arley mine (seam) at 137 feet. The Adlington Coal Company sank Ellerbeck Colliery in 1876. The company went bankrupt in 1932. The mine was run privately during the 1930s and in 1947 was nationalised. As part of the National Coal Board in 1958, Ellerbeck Colliery employed 411 men and women who worked as pit brow lasses, it closed in 1965. In the late 1970s and early '80s Ellerbeck was open cast and has been landscaped.

In 1891 Davies and Eckersley operated the Huyton Bleachworks and the Pin Croft Dyeing and Printing Company were bleachers and finishers. The largest mill was Adlington Mill, Thomas Gerrard and Sons spinning and weaving mill, which had 43,000 spindles and 900 looms. Springfield Mill operated by Thomas Middeton & Company had 700 looms and Unsworth's Brook Mill had 2,700 spindles and 96 looms.

=== The Eagle Street College ===
From the 1890s onwards, Adlington became the successive host to the Eagle Street College, an informal grouping of workers who were early enthusiasts of the American free verse poet Walt Whitman, as its founder James William Wallace moved from his home in Bolton to the cleaner air of Adlington. As a result of his connections with writers, poets, trade unionists and the Independent Labour Party, Wallace's home became a centre of radical politics and culture; he played host to numerous Irish Republican and Indian independence leaders, socialist pioneers Edward Carpenter and Keir Hardie and poets such as Richard Maurice Bucke.

=== Spanish Republicanism ===
During World War II, the grounds of Adlington Hall were used as an internment camp for over 200 Spanish Republican anti-fascists. These refugees had fled to France after the Spanish Civil War, where they had fought for the democratically-elected government, and many of whom had been captured by the Nazis and forced to work as slave labourers building defence infrastructure during the German occupation of the Channel Islands. They were transferred to British custody by war's end, and local Communists, trade unionists and veterans of the International Brigades campaigned for their freedom. By their release in 1946, many of the 226 men opted to live in France, although several dozen stayed in the Adlington, Chorley and Horwich areas after marrying local women, finding work or setting up businesses.

== Governance ==
In the Middle Ages Adlington was in the ecclesiastical parish of Standish in the Leyland Hundred of Lancashire. In 1837, Adlington joined with other townships (or civil parishes) in the area to form the Chorley Poor Law Union which took responsibility for the administration and funding of the Poor Law in that area. A local board was formed in 1872 was replaced by an urban district council of twelve members in 1894.

The village forms part of Chorley Borough which has headquarters at the town hall in Chorley. There is an elected Town Council who meet monthly and a Town Mayor. The village is represented on Chorley council by three Labour Party councillors elected for the Adlington and Anderton ward. Adlington is part of the Chorley parliamentary constituency, which elected Lindsay Hoyle as Member of Parliament for the Labour party at the 2010 General Election.

== Geography ==
Adlington covers an area of 1,064 acres. Its south-east boundary is the River Douglas and Buckow Brook separates the village from Worthington to the west. The Ellerbeck is the boundary with Duxbury.

== Economy ==
Adlington's economy was based on cotton mills and coal pits but the majority of these traditional industries have disappeared. The construction company Leonard Fairclough & Son was founded and based in the village before becoming part of the bigger AMEC group.

== Transport ==
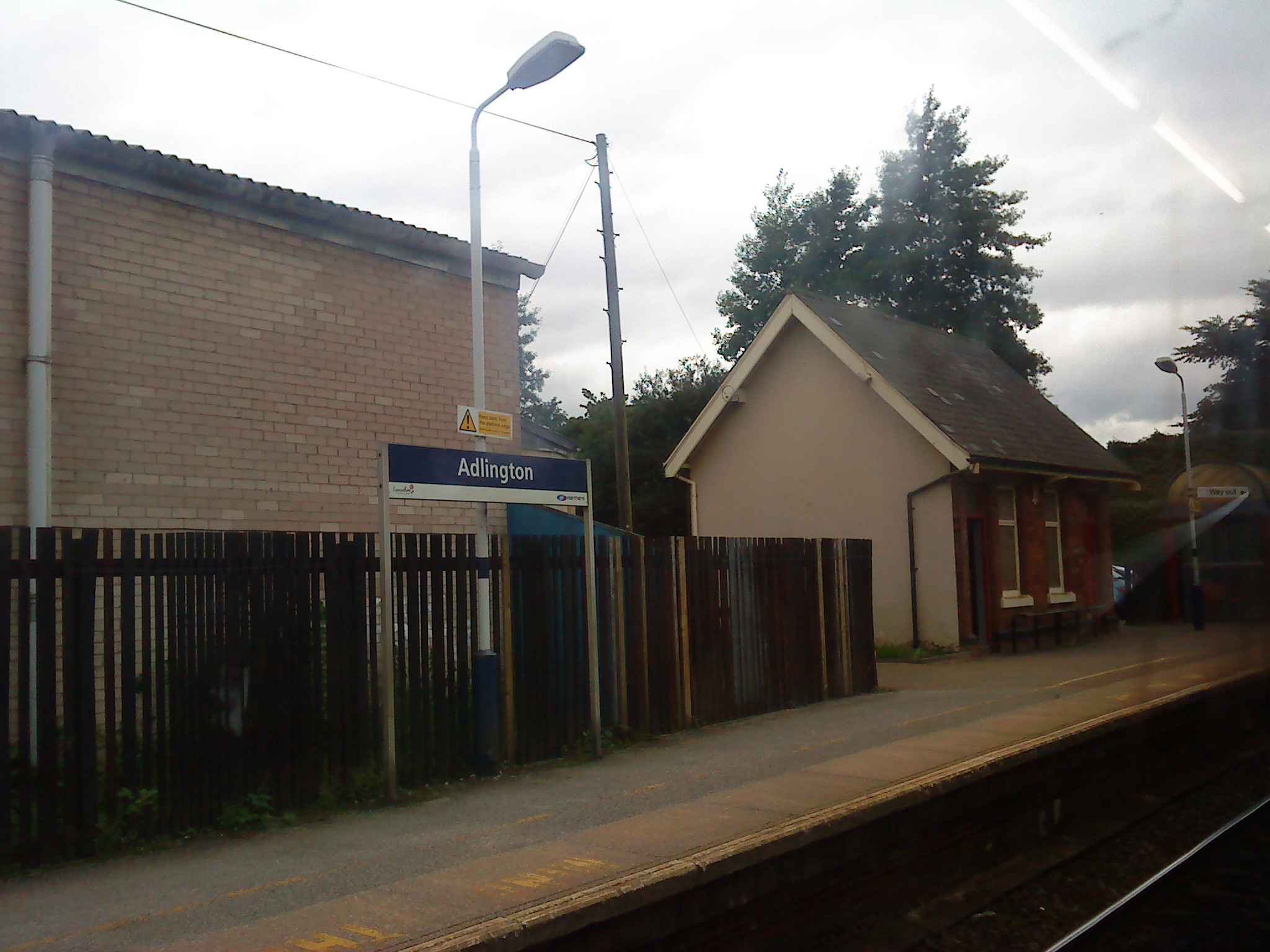
Adlington railway station

Adlington's main road is the A6 from Manchester via Blackrod to Chorley and Preston. It has a junction with the B6227 towards Rivington. The M61 motorway passes the eastern fringe of the village.

Adlington railway station is on the Manchester to Blackpool North Line. Another station, White Bear railway station in Station Road, was on the Lancashire Union Railway between Wigan and Blackburn. It closed in 1960 (the line remained in use for goods until 1974) with the ticket office remaining as a local café. Evidence can be found throughout Adlington of the villages lost line.

The Leeds and Liverpool Canal passes through Adlington where the White Bear Marina is the largest marina on the canal.

Buses are run by Stagecoach Cumbria and North Lancashire and Pilkingtonbus. Stagecoach Cumbria and North Lancashire run services to Preston, Chorley, Middlebrook and Bolton. Pilkingtonbus runs services to Chorley.

== Religion ==
The village has three active churches: St. Paul's (the Church of England parish church), St. Joseph's (a Roman Catholic church), and the United Reformed and Methodist church on Railway Road.

Christ Church, built in 1839, was used as a chapel of ease after St. Paul's Church was built in 1884; it no longer is used for worship and has been converted to a restaurant. Formerly, Adlington also held an iron mission church dedicated to St Philip and Wesleyan, Primitive Methodist, and Congregational churches.

== Sports and recreation ==
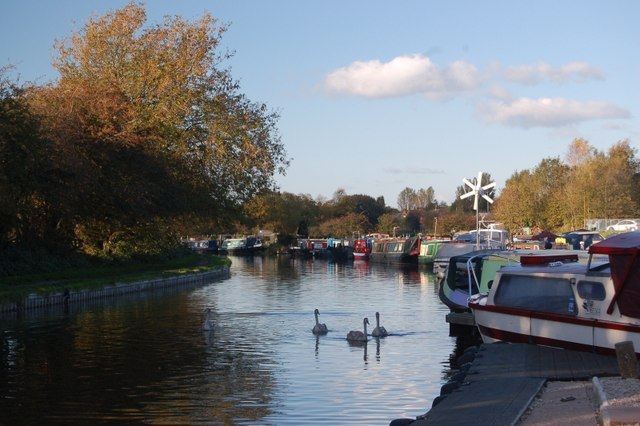
White Bear Marina, Leeds and Liverpool Canal, Adlington

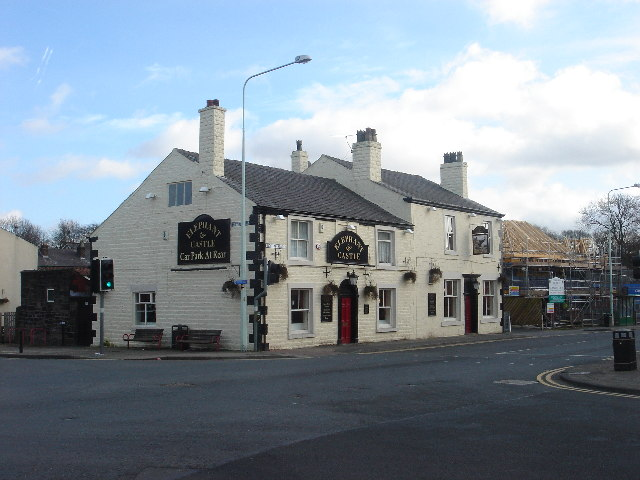
Elephant & Castle pub, Upper Adlington

Adlington has two large recreational areas, the King George's Field in the centre of the village and the Lower Playing Fields adjacent to the canal in lower Adlington. The King George's Field plays host to the village's amateur rugby league club Adlington Rangers and the village's football pub teams. Adlington also has a junior football club with a variety of age groups including an open age team. Meadow Road is home to Adlington Cricket Club which plays in the local Lancashire and Bolton leagues, and Jubilee Park, where Bridge Celtic FC play.

== Notable people ==
- Leonard Fairclough (1853–1927), a stonemason who founded Leonard Fairclough & Son, became a construction magnate and has a memorial garden in the village.
- John Christopher Bradshaw (1876–1950), a New Zealand organist, conductor, choirmaster and university professor.
- Rowland Southern (1882–1935), an aquatic biologist who specialised in the study of the fresh-water and marine life, particularly Annelids (segmented worms)
- Jack Ainscough (1926–2004), footballer, who played 421 games for Fleetwood Town
- Sir Lindsay Hoyle (born 1957), MP for Chorley since 1997, Speaker of the House of Commons since 2019; born and raised in the village

== See also ==
- Listed buildings in Adlington, Lancashire
