= Alastair Lansley =

British architect (born 1947)

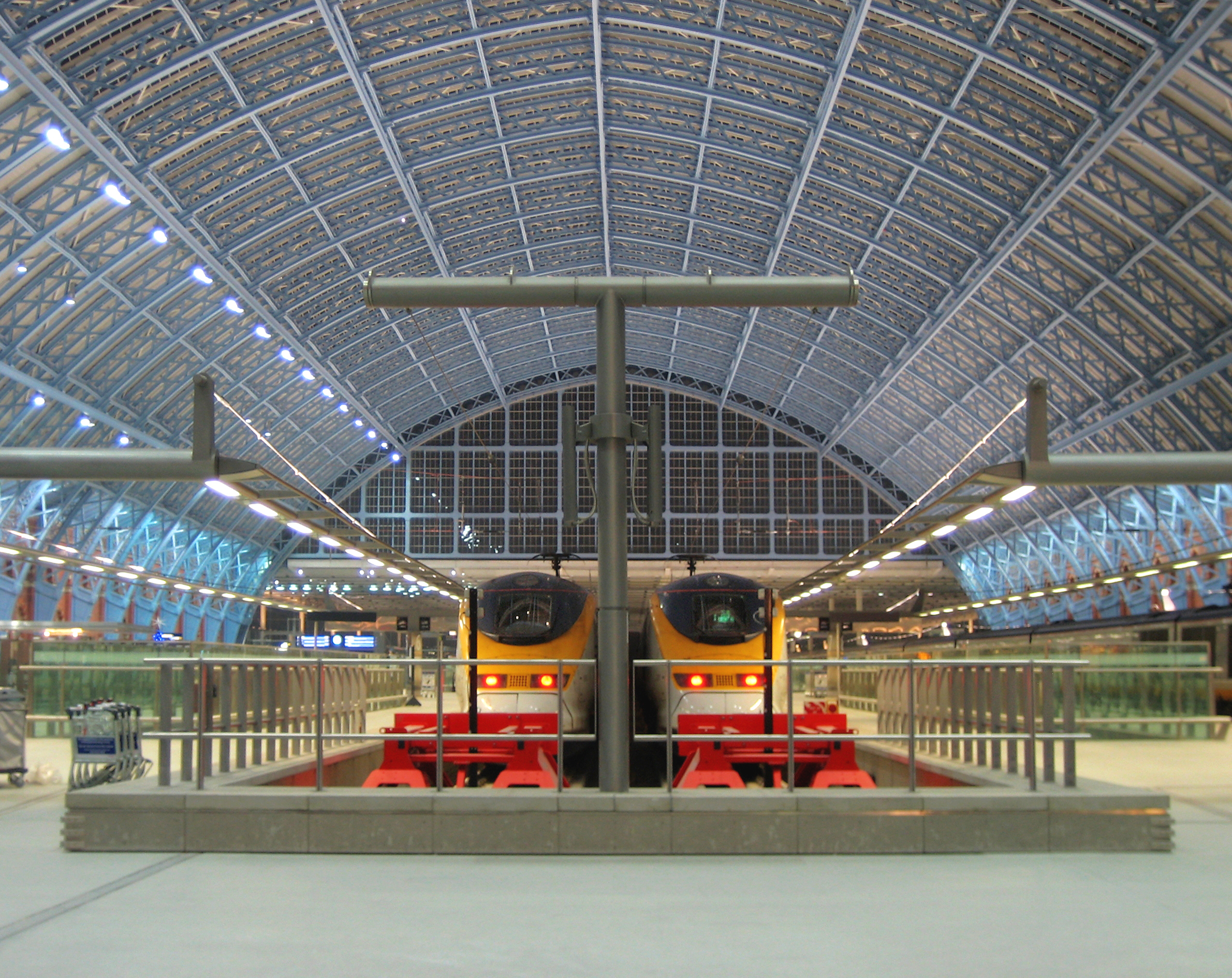
- The redeveloped St Pancras Station, considered Lansley's magnum opus
- Born: 1 December 1947 (age 78); United Kingdom
- Occupation: Architect
- Spouse: Ayse
- Practice: Network Rail
- Projects: St Pancras redevelopment Stratford International; Ebbsfleet International

Alastair Lansley CBE (born 1 December 1947) is a British architect.

Alastair Lansley was the lead architect for the reconstruction and rebuilding of London's St Pancras Station as terminus of the High Speed 1 line from the Channel Tunnel to London. His work at St Pancras includes the construction of a new 13-platform extension deck in a modern manner; reconstruction of the west side of the station (made necessary by the construction of the new Thameslink station box below) in a historically based neo-Gothic manner in the style of Sir George Gilbert Scott; as well as the refurbishment of the original station building by Scott and William Barlow.

Lansley was also Lead Architect for Stratford and Ebbsfleet International Stations, which were designed by project architect Mark Fisher. These stations extend the language of Mies van der Rohe in a contemporary context, and form a close stylistic bond with the new station extension at St Pancras.

A series of BBC television programmes, The Eight Hundred Million Pound Railway Station, were broadcast as six 30-minute episodes between 13 November and 28 November 2007. In this series, the project that was to become St. Pancras International Station was shown during the different phases of construction.

Lansley is a former member of British Rail's architects' department. He worked with lead architect Nick Derbyshire, on the £110 million reshaping of London's Liverpool Street Station in the late 1980s and early 1990s.

It has been reported that a project to rebuild the Euston Arch as part of the redevelopment of Euston Station could be led by Lansley. Rebuilding the Arch has been linked to Euston's potential role of London terminus for the future High Speed 2 link to Birmingham and beyond.

Lansley was appointed Commander of the Order of the British Empire (CBE) in the 2009 Birthday Honours.

== Publications ==
- Lansley, Alastair; Durant, Stuart (2011). The Transformation of St Pancras Station. London: Laurence King. ISBN 978-1-85669-882-5.
