= Listed buildings in Adlington, Lancashire =

Adlington is a civil parish in Lancashire, England. It contains twelve buildings recorded in the National Heritage List for England as designated listed buildings, all designated at Grade II. This grade is the lowest of the three grades given to listed buildings and is applied to "buildings of national importance and special interest". The parish contains the small town of Adlington, surrounded by countryside. The listed buildings in the town consist of a row of three cottages, an active church, a redundant church, and a former school and master's house. Outside the town, the listed buildings are mainly houses, farmhouses, and farm buildings. The Leeds and Liverpool Canal runs through the parish, and two bridges crossing it and an aqueduct carrying it over a river are listed.

== Buildings ==
Name and location	Photograph	Date	Notes
Crawshaw Hall; 53.59889°N 2.61861°W		Early 16th century	Originating as a farmhouse and later converted into a house, an additional wing was added in 1906. The original part is in sandstone with very thick walls, it has a roof partly in slate and partly in stone-slate, and an external stepped chimney stack. It is in two storeys, and has a three-bay front. The windows, some of which were originally mullioned, have been altered. Inside is a timber-framed partition.
Allanson Hall; 53.61532°N 2.61055°W		1618	Originally a farmhouse, it has been extended and converted into three dwellings. It is in partly rendered brick on a stone plinth, and has stone-slate roofs. The building is in a roughly T-shaped plan, has two storeys, and the original part has three bays. At the front are two projections surmounted by ball finials, the one on the right being a porch with an inscribed stone lintel and containing stone benches.
Barn, Allanson Hall; 53.61514°N 2.61013°W		1686	The barn is built in brick with stone quoins and dressings, and has a corrugated sheet roof. It in a T-shaped plan. The barn contains various doorways, one of which has an inscribed lintel, windows and ventilation slots.
Rigby House Farmhouse; 53.60720°N 2.62055°W	—	Early 17th century	A brick farmhouse, later a house, on a stone plinth with stone dressings and a slate roof. It is in two storeys and has a three-bay front. There is a cross-wing at each end and a stair turret, all of which are gabled. The windows are mullioned. Inside is an inglenook with a bressumer.
72, 74 and 76 Market Street; 53.60955°N 2.60479°W		c. 1800	A row of three stone cottages with stone-slate roofs. They are in a double-pile plan, have two storeys, and each house is in a single bay. On the left of each house is a stone doorway with a semicircular head, a keystone and imposts, with a recessed tympanum, and to the right is a sash window in both floors.
Aqueduct; 53.60671°N 2.60632°W		c. 1800	The stone aqueduct carries the Leeds and Liverpool Canal over the River Douglas. It was designed by John Rennie, and consists of a single span about 40 feet (12 m) high. The aqueduct has a single span with a semicircular arch, plain voussoirs and parapet. The side walls and abutments are rusticated.
Red House Bridge; 53.60796°N 2.60725°W		c. 1800	This is bridge number 68 of the Leeds and Liverpool Canal, and carries Harrison Road over the canal. It is in stone, and consists of a single elliptical arch with voussoirs, a keystone, and parapets. At each end are plain pilasters.
Rigstone Bridge; 53.61480°N 2.60990°W		c. 1800	This is bridge number 70 of the Leeds and Liverpool Canal, and carries a roadway over the canal. It is in stone, and consists of a single elliptical arch with voussoirs, a keystone, and parapets. At each end are plain pilasters.
Old School House; 53.60583°N 2.61339°W		1815	Originally a school and a house, later a house. It is in sandstone with a stone-slate roof. The house has a square plan with two rooms on each side, and is in two storeys. On the front of the building are two adjacent round-headed doorways. In the upper storey is an inscribed stone tablet. The windows are casements.
Christ Church; 53.61369°N 2.60431°W		1838–39	Christ Church was a Commissioners' Church designed by Edward Welch in Romanesque Revival style. It is in stone with a slate roof. The church consists of a nave and a short chancel in one range, and a west tower with an octagonal drum. It is now redundant and has been converted into a restaurant, retaining its three galleries.
St Paul's Church; 53.6166°N 2.6011°W		1883–84	The church was designed by T. D. Barry and Sons, and is in Gothic Revival style. It is built in yellow stone with red stone dressings, and has a slate roof with a red tile crest. It consists of a nave with aisles, transepts, a chancel, and a tower incorporating a porch at the southwest corner. In the north transept is stained glass by Morris & Co. The planned spire was never built.
Adlington and District War Memorial; 53.61535°N 2.60078°W		1927	The war memorial consists of a pylon standing within a forecourt in a garden. The pylon and forecourt walls are in sandstone, and on the memorial are bronze plaques. The pylon consists of a rear wall with a stepped top, from which stub walls project forward and end in Tuscan columns carrying an entablature with a moulded cornice and finials. In the recess between the columns is a plaque with inscriptions, and further plaques carrying the names of those who died in both world wars, and in an earthquake in 1935. The forecourt is surrounded at the front and sides by a balustrade on a chamfered plinth with a central entrance and with piers that have square caps and ball finials.
