= Richard Clayton (Irish judge) =

English-born Irish politician and judge

Richard Clayton (1702–1770) was an English-born politician and judge in eighteenth-century Ireland who held the office of Chief Justice of the Irish Common Pleas. His reputation was seriously damaged by the trial and execution of Father Nicholas Sheehy, which is acknowledged to have been a notable miscarriage of justice.

== Biography ==
He was the second son of Richard Clayton, Lord of the Manor of Adlington, Lancashire and Martha Horton, daughter of Joseph Horton of Chadderton, ancestor of the Horton Baronets. He entered the Inner Temple in 1724 and was called to the Bar in 1729, King's Counsel 1768. He inherited Adlington Hall and its adjoining estate in Lancashire.

He sat in the House of Commons as member for Wigan and was Recorder of that town. His most memorable case as a barrister was as defence counsel for Francis Towneley for his part in the Rebellion of 1745: Towneley was found guilty of treason and executed, but given the strength of the evidence against him (he was taken in arms), this need not reflect any lack of ability on his counsel's part.

Clayton was sent to Ireland as Chief Justice of the Common Pleas in 1765 and held office until 1770, when ill-health forced him to step down. He retired to Adlington and died there later the same year. He is buried in Standish Church. He was unmarried, and his heir was his nephew Richard, who was created a baronet.

== Father Sheehy ==
Clayton is mainly remembered for presiding over the trial of Nicholas Sheehy, parish priest of Clogheen, County Tipperary on a charge of being accessory to the murder of John Bridge, at the Clonmel Assizes in March 1766. The trial "became proverbial in Ireland for injustice". Sheehy, a noted opponent of the Penal Laws, had already been unsuccessfully prosecuted for conspiracy and high treason. There is little doubt that the prosecution witnesses, many of whom had testified against him before, were lying. Sheehy had a good alibi for the time of the alleged murder: indeed it is very doubtful that there was a murder at all, since there was no corpse, and the Crown produced no evidence that Bridge was dead. On hearing the death sentence pronounced, Sheehy's counsel told the judge and jury that "if there was any justice they would all die roaring." It has, however, been argued that Judge Clayton in his summing-up actually leaned towards recommending that the jury return with an acquittal. Instead, Fr. Sheehy was hanged on 15 March.

Clayton also presided at the related trial of Sheehy's cousin Edmund. Edmund was executed and again the conduct of the trial was widely criticised, although Edmund Sheehy himself said that Judge Clayton had acted justly .

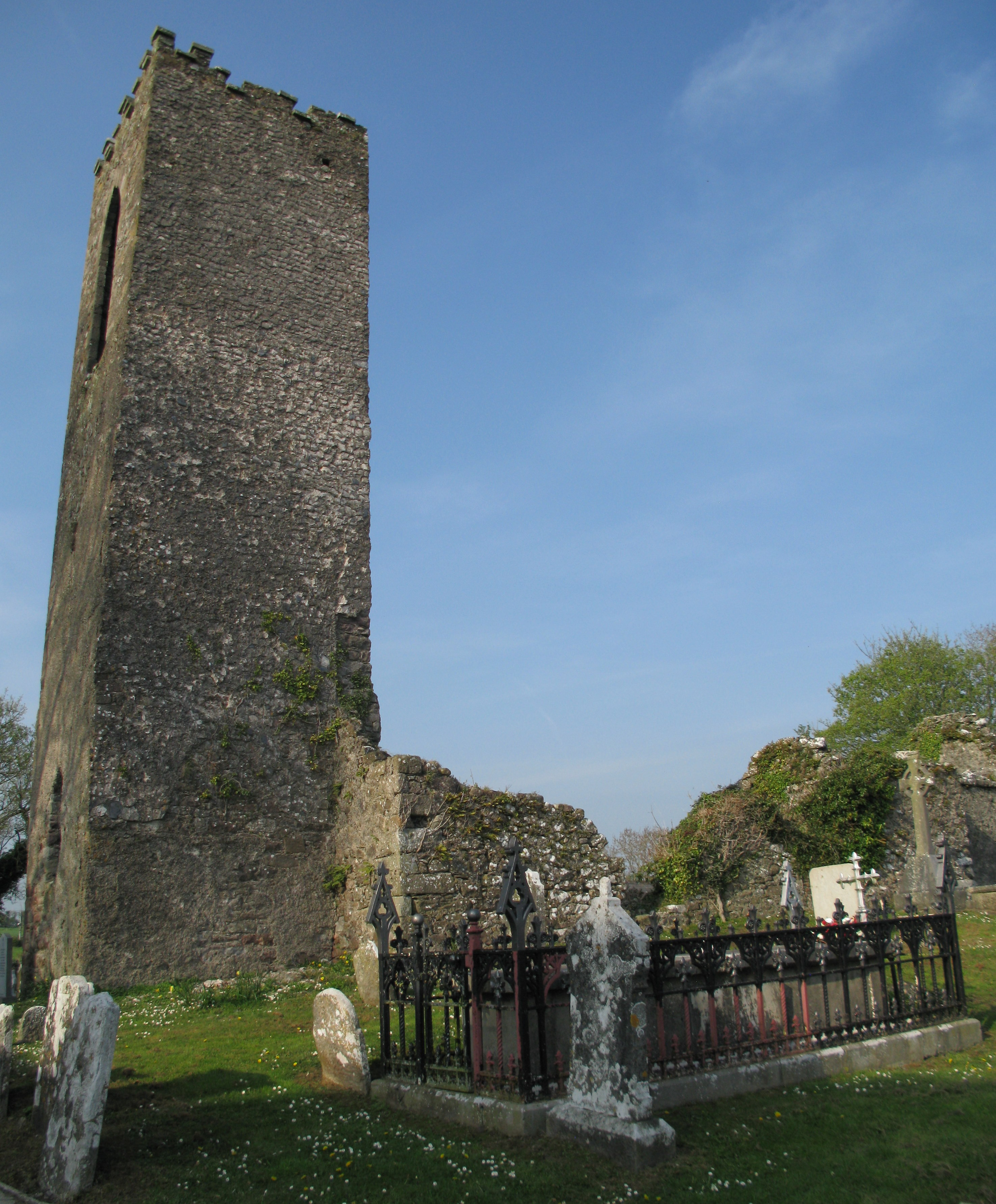
Father Sheehy's grave at Shanrahan cemetery, near Clogheen, County Tipperary

== Reputation ==
Irish historians have criticised Clayton severely for his handling of the Sheehy case, although it is not suggested that he had any corrupt motive: Elrington Ball blames his actions on naivety and unfamiliarity with Irish politics. There is evidence that in other cases he acted justly and humanely: a later Lord Chancellor of Ireland, the Earl of Clare, remembered him as a good man and an honest judge.

Legal offices
Preceded by Richard Aston	Chief Justice of the Irish Common Pleas; 1765–1770	Succeeded by Marcus Paterson
