= MACTEC =

- Company type: Private corporation
- Industry: Engineering & Design, Environmental Consulting, Remedial Construction
- Founded: 1975
- Headquarters: Alpharetta, Georgia, USA
- Key people: Peter Gouzinnia, PE, CEO
- Owner: Nautic Partners (majority)
- Number of employees: 3,100
- Divisions: MDC, MEC
- Website: www.mactec.com

MACTEC was among the largest engineering design companies in the United States. The company provided engineering, environmental, and construction services to private- and public-sector clients. MACTEC was based in Denver, Colorado until 2002, when they merged with LAW Engineering and the headquarters were moved to Alpharetta, Georgia. At that time they employed 3100 staff in 80 locations, with capability in more than 50 scientific and engineering disciplines. The company consisted primarily of two primary operating entities.

- MACTEC Engineering and Consulting (MEC): MEC provided engineering, environmental consulting and remediation, facility lifecycle management, sustainable design, and construction consulting. Special services include disaster response and recovery, and building engineering for LEED certification.
- MACTEC Development Corporation (MDC): MDC provided construction and demolition, nuclear decontamination and decommissioning (D&D), hazmat remediation, risk management, and radiological services.

== History ==
Management Analysis Company (later changed to MACTEC) was founded in 1975 to serve the electric utility and nuclear power industries, expanding during the 1980s into nuclear site remediation. In 1997, MACTEC began strategic acquisition of companies that provided design/build and environmental services.

=== Mergers and acquisitions ===
- Acquisition and merger of Harding Lawson Associates and Environmental Science & Engineering (forming Harding ESE) added manufacturing, chemical, transportation, and telecommunications.
- Acquisition of Pacific Environmental Services Inc. added value engineering, occupational health and safety, water and wastewater management, and pollution prevention.
- Merger with Law Engineering and Environmental Services doubled MACTEC size and revenue, and added environmental and geotechnical engineering, facility management, construction quality assurance, and expanded geographic coverage.
- In May 2011, AMEC announced that it had entered a deal to buy MACTEC for $280 million.
