= William Press Group =

- Company type: Public
- Industry: Offshore engineering
- Founded: 1913
- Defunct: 1982
- Fate: Merger with Leonard Fairclough & Son
- Successor: Amec Foster Wheeler
- Headquarters: London, UK
- Key people: Tony Hawken (Chairman) Ray Daniels (CEO)

William Press Group was a British engineering business which merged with Leonard Fairclough & Son to become a FTSE 100 company, AMEC.

== History ==
The company was founded by William Allpress in 1913 in London.

In 1954 it started to focus on developments in cathodic protection for pipelines forming Metal and Pipeline Endurance Ltd ('MAPEL').

In the 1970s it converted about 50% of the UK's houses from town gas to natural gas. It also diversified into offshore oil and gas under the leadership of Tony Hawken and Ray Daniels.

The name of the company changed from William Press & Son to William Press Group in 1981.

It merged with Leonard Fairclough & Son in 1982 to form AMEC.
