= St Paul's Church, Adlington =

Coordinates: 53.6166°N 2.6011°W

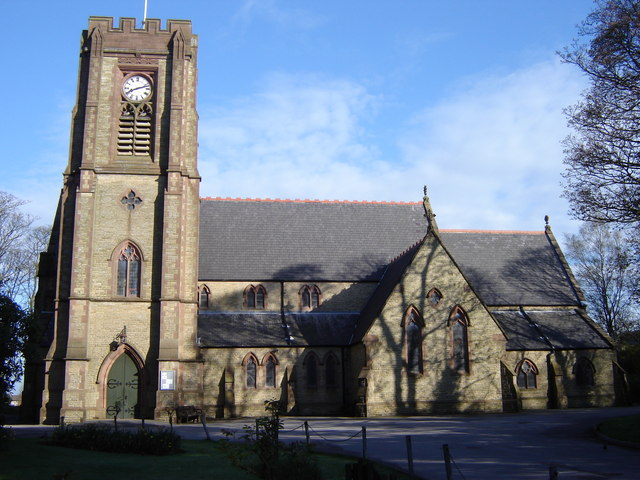
- St Paul's Church, Adlington, from the south

- Location in the Borough of Chorley
- OS grid reference: SD 603 135
- Location: Railway Road, Adlington, Lancashire
- Country: England
- Denomination: Anglican
- Churchmanship: Catholic
- Website: St Paul, Adlington

History
- Status: Parish church

Architecture
- Functional status: Active
- Heritage designation: Grade II
- Designated: 13 July 1966
- Architect(s): T. D. Barry and Sons
- Architectural type: Church
- Style: Gothic Revival
- Groundbreaking: 1883
- Completed: 1884; 142 years ago
- Construction cost: £8,000

Specifications
- Capacity: 400
- Materials: Stone, slate roof

Administration
- Province: York
- Diocese: Blackburn
- Archdeaconry: Blackburn
- Deanery: Chorley
- Parish: Adlington

Clergy
- Vicar: Fr. Graeme Buttery

St Paul's Church is in Railway Road, Adlington, Lancashire, England. It is an active Anglican parish church in the deanery of Chorley, the archdeaconry of Blackburn, and the diocese of Blackburn. The church is recorded in the National Heritage List for England as a designated Grade II listed building. It is registered as a parish of the Society under the patronage of St Wilfrid and St Hilda.

== History ==
St Paul's was built in 1883–84 and designed by T. D. Barry and Sons, at a cost of £8,000 (£860,000 in 2025). The tower was added following the First World War as a memorial to those who lost their lives.

== Architecture ==
=== Exterior ===
The church is in Gothic Revival style, incorporating Early English and Decorated features. It is constructed in yellow stone with red stone dressings; the roof is of Welsh slate, with a crest of red tiles. The plan consists of a five-bay nave with a clerestory, north and south aisles, north and south transepts, and a chancel. At the southeast corner is a three-stage tower, containing an entrance porch in the bottom stage. The tower is supported by angle buttresses, it has paired bell openings and clock faces in the top stage, and a battlemented parapet. There were plans to have a tall spire, but this was never built. Along the sides of the aisles are single-light windows, with two-light windows in the clerestory. In the north and south walls of the transepts are two lancet windows with an oval window above.

=== Interior ===
Inside the church are five-bay arcades carried on clustered piers with moulded capitals and moulded arches. The transept and chancel arches are higher but similar. The roof of the nave is scissor-braced. In the north transept are stained glass windows by Morris & Co. dated 1895 and 1897, and in the south aisle are two windows of 1953 by A. F. Erridge. There is a ring of eight bells, all cast by John Taylor & Co; one dates from 1932, one from 1933, and the rest from 1934.

== Clergy ==
=== The History of Incumbents ===
Rev. T Carpenter 1885 – 1894

Rev. T H Minett 1894 – 1921

Rev. A H Baker 1922 – 1928*

Rev. W R Coombs 1928 – 1937

Rev. C Gamble 1938 – 1944

Rev. A Hodgson 1944 – 1962

Rev. F Haworth 1963 – 1969

Rev. E Carter 1969 – 1975

Rev. R A Andrew 1976 – 1985

Fr. D F C Morgan 1986 – 2011

Fr. D A Arnold 2012 – 2021

Fr. G Buttery 2022 – Date

* Rev. Baker died whilst still in office

== See also ==
- Listed buildings in Adlington, Lancashire
