= Sir Richard Clayton, 1st Baronet =

English barrister, diplomat and translator

Sir Richard Clayton, 1st Baronet (1745–1828) was an English barrister and diplomat, remembered as a translator.

== Life ==
He was the son of John Clayton of Northall, Lancashire by Elizabeth, daughter of the Rev. Dr. Goodwin, rector of Tankersley, Yorkshire. He was the nephew of Richard Clayton, Chief Justice of the Irish Common Pleas, who by his will, dated 16 March 1770, left him via Goodwin his manors of Adlington, Cheshire, (including Adlington Hall), and Worthington, near Wigan.

Clayton studied at Brasenose College, Oxford. He was a member of the Inner Temple, where he was admitted in 1762, called to the bar in 1771, and reader in 1811. He was created a baronet on 3 May 1774, elected a fellow of the Society of Antiquaries of London and a Fellow of the Royal Society in 1806.

He was recorder of Wigan (1815–28), Constable of Lancaster Castle, and British consul at Nantes, where he died on 29 April 1828.

== Works ==
Clayton published the following translations and other works:

- "On the Cretins of the Vallais", a paper in the Memoirs of the Manchester Literary and Philosophical Society, 1790.
- Connubia Florum Latino carmine demonstrata; auctore D. De la Croix, notas et observationes adjecit, Bath, 1791.
- A Critical Inquiry into the Life of Alexander the Great by the Ancient Historians, translated from the French of the Baron de St. Croix, Bath, 1793; which he made additions.
- Memoirs of the House of Medici, from the French of M. Tenhove, with notes and observations, Bath, 1797, 2 vols.
- The Science of Legislation, from the Italian of Filangieri, 1806.
- A Treatise on Greyhounds, in The Pamphleteer, vol. ix. 1817.

== Family ==
Clayton married in 1780 Ann, daughter of Charles White, an eminent surgeon of Manchester, and left an only daughter, who married Lieutenant-general Robert Browne. Lady Clayton died at Cheltenham on 23 November 1837.

== Notes ==
Attribution

This article incorporates text from a publication now in the public domain: Stephen, Leslie, ed. (1887). "Clayton, Richard (d.1828)". Dictionary of National Biography. Vol. 11. London: Smith, Elder & Co.

Baronetage of Great Britain
New creation	Baronet (of Adlington); 1774–1828	Succeeded by Robert Clayton
