= Leonard Fairclough & Son =

English construction firm

- Company type: Public
- Industry: Construction, Demolition
- Founded: 1883
- Defunct: 1982
- Fate: Merger with William Press
- Successor: Amec Foster Wheeler
- Headquarters: Adlington, Lancashire, England

Leonard Fairclough & Son Ltd was a construction firm based in Adlington, Lancashire, England.

== History ==
The firm was founded by Leonard Fairclough, a stonemason in Adlington who established his business in 1883. Leonard's son, Leonard Miller Fairclough, joined the company and continued to run it during the First World War. From 1917, the company traded as Leonard Fairclough Limited. In 1927, Leonard Miller Fairclough became chairman of the company, and retained this position until he retired in 1965.

Sir Leonard was succeeded by Sir Oswald Davies, who took Fairclough from being a regional contractor to one of the most successful national contractors. Davies bought a number of well known construction businesses, including CV Buchan, Fram Group and Sir Lindsay Parkinson & Company.

Also in the 1960s, Fairclough entered the private housebuilding market (Fairclough Homes) with the acquisition of the Lancashire firm of RJ Barton and Tarrant Builders (noted for its ownership of Wentworth Golf Club). Fairclough Homes continued to trade under its own name after the formation of AMEC. In 1982, Fairclough and William Press Group merged to form AMEC.

== Projects ==
The company specialised in bridge building. During the 1950s, the company built thirty one bridges in the Manchester area, and bridges on the Preston By-pass, which was the first motorway in England, later part of the M6. During this decade they laid the foundations for the Silver Jubilee Bridge between Runcorn and Widnes and constructed its carriageway. During the 1960s the company built parts of the M6 and M62 in consortium with Alfred McAlpine. Fairclough built the bridges, and McAlpine the roads.

The company, again working with Alfred McAlpine, also built the M53 Motorway from Chester to the Wirral, also called the mid-Wirral motorway, completed in 1972.

During 1972 to 1978, Fairclough built the Liverpool Link Line, partly underground and now called Merseyrail Northern Line, connecting Liverpool city centre with Hunt's Cross and Southport to Kirkby, and the low level Central Station in Liverpool City Centre. All the concrete segments for the Northern Line (low level) and for the Loop Line (deep level, built by Edmund Nuttall) were supplied by C V Buchan & Sons.
