= Amec Foster Wheeler =

British engineering company

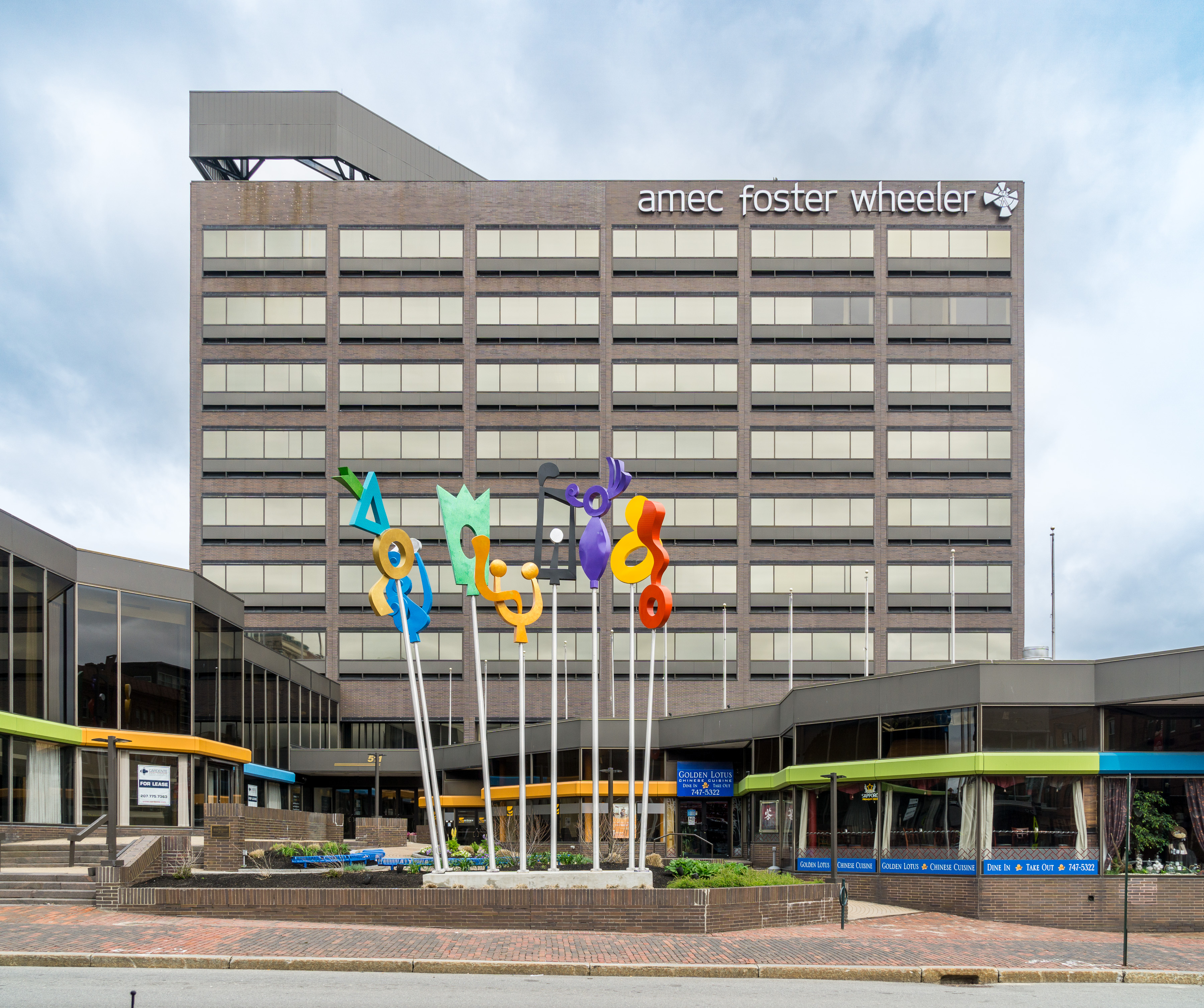
- Amec Foster Wheeler building in Portland, Maine, USA
- Type: Public
- Traded as: LSE: AMFW; NYSE: AMFW
- ISIN: GB0000282623
- Industry: Engineering and project management
- Predecessor: Amec; Foster Wheeler
- Founded: 1982
- Defunct: 9 October 2017
- Fate: Acquired by the Wood Group
- Headquarters: London, England
- Area served: Australia; Europe; North America
- Key people: John Connolly (Chairman); Jonathan Lewis (CEO)
- Revenue: £5,440 million (2016)
- Operating income: £300 million (2016)
- Net income: £(514) million (2016)
- Number of employees: 36,000 (2017)
- Website: www.amecfw.com

Amec Foster Wheeler was a British multinational consultancy, engineering and project management company headquartered in London, England.

AMEC, an acronym for Amalgamated Mechanical Engineering and Construction, was formed in 1982 when Leonard Fairclough & Son and William Press Group merged. In 2014, AMEC merged with Foster Wheeler and was rebranded Amec Foster Wheeler. In October 2017, it was acquired by the Wood Group.

Amec Foster Wheeler was listed on the London Stock Exchange and its American Depositary Shares were traded on the New York Stock Exchange.

== History ==
Amalgamated Mechanical Engineering and Construction (AMEC) was formed from the 1982 amalgamation of Leonard Fairclough & Son and the William Press Group. In 1988, AMEC acquired Matthew Hall Group.

During the mid 1990s, Norwegian engineering company Kvaerner negotiated with AMEC's board towards a potential acquisition of the latter; after talks broke down, Kvaerner launched to a hostile takeover bid. Kvaerner increased its shareholding to 26%and presented AMEC's other shareholders with a single offer of £361 million for the outstanding shares. Around the same timeframe, AMEC made its own bid to merge with rival British construction firm Alfred McAlpine; however, the latter's board voted against the move.

In 1996, AMEC took a 40% stake in Spie Batignolles from Schneider in association with a management buyout. Amec launched the AMEC Spie brand for engineering services in Europe. A rail construction business, AMEC Spie Rail, was founded and the remaining construction business was retained as Spie Batignolles. The company announced that it would seek to sell the construction arm of the business Spie Batignolles, and entered negotiations to secure a management buyout of that division; the management buyout of the construction arm of Spie was completed in September 2003 with the aid of Barclays Private Equity Finance, and later that year Amec took full control of the remaining parts of Spie.

The company continued making numerous acquisitions during the new millennium. These included Ogden Environmental & Energy Services and AGRA Monenco Inc., a North American engineering and services company, both in 2000 as well as the US operations and equipment of Lauren Kamtech in 2003. In 2004, AMEC, as part of a joint venture with Fluor Corporation, was awarded a multi-year contract to assist in the reconstruction of Iraqi infrastructure following the 2003 invasion of Iraq; while lucrative in the long run, the arrangement initially yielded little profit as well as being a slow revenue stream. AMEC continued to be involved in Iraq into the late 2010s.

In 2005 AMEC acquired Houston-based oil and gas engineering services company Paragon Engineering Services, and formed AMEC Paragon, to operate as part of AMEC's global oil and gas business. Also during 2005, AMEC acquired UK-based NNC, a large nuclear consulting company and its subsidiaries, including Ontario-based Nuclear Safety Solutions, the nuclear safety division of Ontario Power Generation, which was spun off when OPG was privatised.

In 2005, the Australian technical, construction, mechanical and electrical business was sold to Leighton Services. The European engineering business, AMEC Spie, was sold to PAI Partners for €1.04 billion in 2006. The European rail business joint venture Amec Spie Rail systems was sold to Colas Rail.

In 2007, AMEC purchased UK environmental consultancy Applied Environmental Research Centre (AERC), providers of environmental science, planning engineering and monitoring services, and sold its UK construction arm to Morgan Sindall. During 2008, it sold its internal plant hire division to Speedy Hire before buying project services company Rider Hunt International, North American environmental consulting firm Geomatrix Consultants, and Slovak nuclear services company AllDeco. In 2009, AMEC acquired Performance Improvement Group, Journeaux, Bedard & Associates and GRD Limited and in 2010, it continued to expand with the £61.2 m purchase of Entec UK, one of the UK's largest Environmental Consultancies. GRD Limited was a Perth, Australia based company incorporating three companies Global Renewables, GRD Minproc, and Kirfield.

During 2011, the company acquired US-based BCI Engineers & Scientists, MACTEC, a US-based engineering consultancy company, and Zektin Group, an Australian-based specialist engineering consultancy for the oil and gas and resources industries. AMEC also purchased Australian-based businesses Currie & Brown and BurmanGriffiths; furthermore, it acquired a majority stake in S2V Consulting.

In January 2014, AMEC agreed terms for a £1.9bn takeover of rival Foster Wheeler. AMEC completed its purchase of Foster Wheeler on 13 November 2014, marking the move by changed its name to Amec Foster Wheeler.

During the summer of 2015, the company announced that it was responding to a decline in oil prices by reorientation towards brownfield sites and activities outside of the US. In November of that year, it announced the raising of its cost cutting target to $180m by 2017 along with the reduction of its final dividend by a half compared to the previous year. The large debts that had been incurred during Amec's acquisition of Foster Wheeler could not reasonably be serviced when the oil and gas sectors, key clients of Amec Foster Wheeler, reduced their spending as a reaction to a global downturn in revenues. The resultant financial difficulties led to the company's chief executive Samir Brikho stepping down in January 2016.

In March 2017, Wood Group announced it would acquire the company for £2.2 billion. On 9 October 2017, following approval from the Competition and Markets Authority, the transaction was completed. In the months following the transaction, John Wood Group opted to sell off some of the recently acquired portions of Amec Foster Wheeler, including its North Sea oil & gas interests and its North American nuclear operation. Other moves included a rebranding exercise and several office closures.

== Operations ==
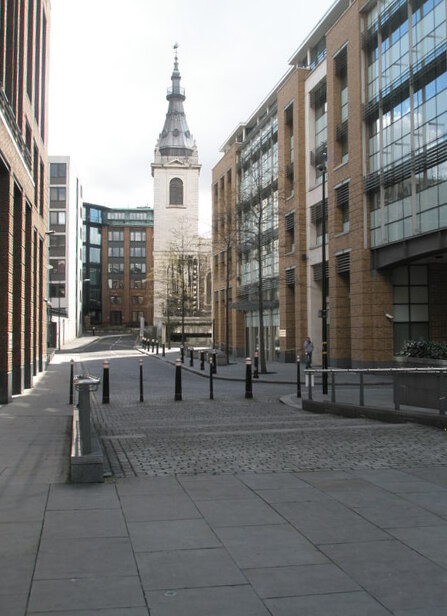
Head office of Amec Foster Wheeler in London (on the right)

Amec Foster Wheeler employed over 40,000 people in more than 55 countries. The company had three geographic business units covering engineering and project delivery operations—Americas; Northern Europe & Commonwealth of Independent States; Asia, Middle East, Africa & Southern Europe—and one power equipment business unit operating worldwide - The Global Power Group.

AMEC's operations were structured until October 2012 into Natural Resources, Power & Process and Environment & Infrastructure.

Amec's UK construction business was sold in 2007. Amongst its notable projects were: the Kielder Dam completed in 1982, the Cumberland Infirmary completed in 2001, the M6 Toll completed in 2003, new offices for HM Revenue & Customs at Longbenton completed in 2005, the Docklands Light Railway City Airport extension completed in 2005, the University College Hospital completed in 2005 and the New York Times Building completed in 2007.

=== Charity ===
Amec Foster Wheeler supported children's charity SOS Children's Villages from 2007, funding educational projects in Asia. Amec Foster Wheeler also funded a green project in the Children's Village in Gwagwalada, Nigeria, enabling houses to become self-sufficient following the installation of solar power and water infrastructure.

== Corruption ==
On 1 July 2021, the Serious Fraud Office (SFO) entered into a Deferred Prosecution Agreement (DPA) with Amec Foster Wheeler relating to the use of corrupt agents in the oil and gas sector. The DPA, was approved by Lord Justice Edis, sitting at the Royal Courts of Justice. Under the terms of the DPA, AFW paid a financial penalty and costs amounting to £103m in the UK, which formed part of the US$177 million global settlement with UK, US and Brazilian authorities. The amounts paid by AFW in the UK include payment of the SFO’s costs of £3.4 million and payment of compensation to the people of Nigeria of £211,000.
