= Lostock railway station =

Railway station in Greater Manchester, England

Lostock
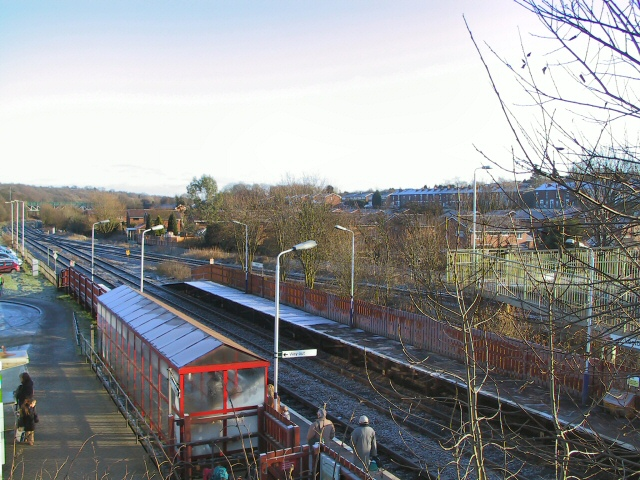
- Lostock station (2005), looking east. The Wigan lines on the right (with no platforms) can be seen joining the main line in the distance.

General information
- Location: Lostock, Bolton; England
- Coordinates: 53.573°N 2.494°W
- Grid reference: SD674086
- Managed by: Northern Trains
- Transit authority: Greater Manchester
- Platforms: 2
- Tracks: 4

Other information
- Station code: LOT
- Classification: DfT category E

History
- Original company: Liverpool and Bury Railway
- Pre-grouping: Lancashire and Yorkshire Railway
- Post-grouping: London, Midland and Scottish Railway

Key dates
- c. August 1852: Station opened as Lostock Junction
- 7 November 1966: Station closed
- 16 May 1988: Reopened as Lostock Parkway
- ?: Renamed Lostock

Passengers
- 2020/21: ▼47,064
- 2021/22: ▲0.144 million
- 2022/23: ▲0.177 million
- 2023/24: ▲0.227 million
- 2024/25: ▲0.286 million
Location
Notes
- Passenger statistics from the Office of Rail and Road

Lostock railway station serves the suburbs of Heaton and Lostock in Bolton, Greater Manchester, England. Built for the Liverpool and Bury Railway in 1852, the station was closed in 1966, then reopened on a smaller scale in 1988 to serve commuters.

According to large scale Ordnance Survey maps and local usage, the surrounding area is named Lostock Junction and the station is referred to as such by many local people. Network Rail's "location map" uses the same name. This is similar to the situation in London where Clapham Junction railway station is in fact in Battersea, and the surrounding area has taken the name of Clapham Junction. Lostock itself is over a mile to the west of the station.

== History ==
The railway line between Bolton and Preston had opened as far as Rawlinson Bridge (between Adlington and Chorley) on 4 February 1841, and among the original stations on this route, the first station out of Bolton was at Blackrod. On 20 November 1848, the Liverpool and Bury Railway was opened giving a route between Bolton and Wigan, and the point where it connected to the Bolton–Preston line was named Lostock Junction; the first station out of Bolton on this route was Westhoughton. Later, a station was constructed at the junction, also named Lostock Junction, which opened around August 1852. The station gave its name to the village which grew around it. This station had platforms on both the Preston and Wigan routes.

On 17 July 1920, four people were killed and 148 were injured in a near head-on collision between two Lancashire & Yorkshire Railway passenger trains at Lostock Junction due to a signal having erroneously been ignored at danger.

Lostock Junction Station closed on 7 November 1966 as part of the programme of cuts initiated by the Beeching Report of 1963. However, on 16 May 1988 the station was reopened, but now with platforms only on the Preston route and renamed Lostock Parkway, a large car park for the use of park-and-ride commuters having been provided. The suffix "Parkway" was later dropped.

== Services ==
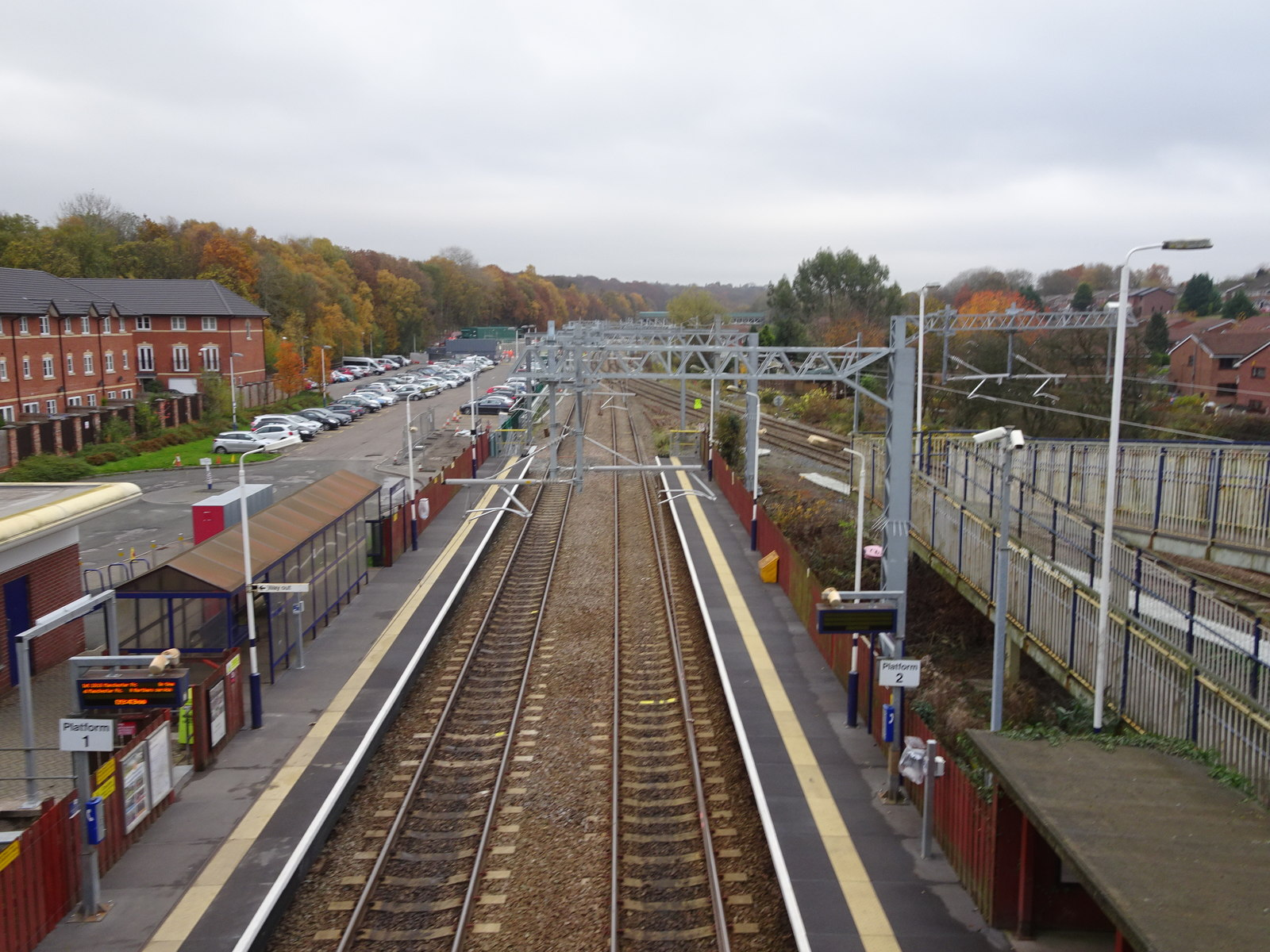
The station in 2018, following completion of electrification works.

The two-platform station is served by two Northern services per hour southbound to Manchester Airport via Manchester Piccadilly and northbound to Preston and Blackpool North. It is a popular commuter station.

Saturday and Sunday services were replaced by buses most weekends from May 2015 until November 2018 due to the late-running electrification work on the route. Weekend services resumed on Sunday 11 November 2018 after the completion of the electrification engineering work.

Electric service commenced on Monday 11 February 2019, operated by Class 319 electric multiple units.

Sunday services are reduced to 1 train per hour, with 4 services on Sunday mornings terminating at Manchester Oxford Road. All services are operated using Class 323 and Class 331 electric units.

Before the December 2022 timetable change, services from Lostock were one train per hour in each direction, with only the Airport services stopping here. The number of trains was increased from one to two trains per hour after the services were rerouted to both terminate at Manchester Airport.

== Station improvements ==
Most recently in early 2009, the station has had a passenger information display system installed, giving waiting passengers on the platforms information about trains that are due to arrive. Fully computer automated, it is also equipped with an audio speaker system, giving the benefit of announcements of train arrivals and delays. During December 2008 - Spring 2009 the car park facilities were greatly improved by extending and resurfacing the land surrounding the railway, with the addition of floodlighting and CCTV. In April 2023, the stations information dot-matrix display screens were replaced.

== Facilities ==
The station has a ticket office, which is staffed from start of service until 19:35, six days per week (closed Sundays). A ticket vending machine is in place for purchase of tickets or promise to pay coupons when the ticket office is closed and for the collection of pre-paid tickets. Shelters are located on each platform and both have step-free access (via ramps northbound).

Preceding station	National Rail	Following station
Horwich Parkway	Northern Trains; Manchester to Preston Line	Bolton
	Historical railways	
Lostock Lane; Line open, station closed	Lancashire and Yorkshire Railway; Bolton and Preston Railway	Bolton; Line and station open
Chew Moor; Line open, station closed	Lancashire and Yorkshire Railway; Liverpool and Bury Railway	Bolton; Line and station open
