= Horwich Branch =

The Horwich Branch was a 1.4-mile-long (2.3 km) double-track branch Lancashire and Yorkshire Railway built branch line that ran from two forks either side of Blackrod railway station on the Manchester to Preston Line to Horwich also serving the Horwich Works.

== History ==
=== Opening ===
The line opened on 14 February 1870 to serve the town of Horwich, but by 1884 the land to the east of the line south of the town had been chosen for a major locomotive works.

=== Horwich station closure ===
Horwich Railway Station closed to passenger traffic on 27 September 1965, and goods the next year. The line to Horwich Works remained open until their closure in 1983.

=== Horwich Parkway station opening ===
Thirty-four years later Horwich Parkway railway station opened in 1999, adjacent to Reebok Stadium. The nearest railway station to much of Horwich (including the town centre), however, is Blackrod.
