= Lostock Lane railway station =

Former railway station in England

Lostock Lane

General information
- Location: Lostock, Bolton; England
- Coordinates: 53.5742°N 2.5274°W
- Grid reference: SD652087
- Platforms: 2 (probable)

Other information
- Status: Disused

History
- Original company: Bolton and Preston Railway
- Pre-grouping: Lancashire and Yorkshire Railway

Key dates
- November 1846: Station opened
- 1 June 1879: Station closed
Location

Lostock Lane railway station served the Lostock area of Greater Manchester, England. It was located in a rural setting where Lostock Lane crossed the line. During industrialisation, nearby Horwich, Blackrod, and Lostock all grew rapidly, leaving Lostock Lane station with little source of traffic.

The station was situated immediately west of the bridge carrying Lostock Lane. By 2015 no trace of the station could be seen, though the flattened station site remains railway property with good access for road vehicles. The double tracks through the site are well used and have been electrified.

Preceding station	Disused railways	Following station
Lostock Junction; Line and station open	Lancashire and Yorkshire Railway	Blackrod; Line and station open

Since closure of Lostock Lane, Lostock Junction has been renamed Lostock and a new station has been opened between Lostock Lane and Blackrod called Horwich Parkway.
