= Bolton and Preston Railway =

Overview
- Locale: Lancashire
- Dates of operation: 15 July 1837–10 May 1844
- Successor: North Union Railway

Technical
- Track gauge: 4 ft 8 1/2 in (1,435 mm) standard gauge

The Bolton and Preston Railway (B&PR) connected Bolton and Preston, in Lancashire, England. Its authorising act of Parliament forbade its early completion to protect the North Union Railway (NUR) and imposed other restrictions that limited the success of the B&PR. A change of route was authorised to bypass the delay making it dependent on the goodwill of the NUR to reach Preston. The NUR saw the B&PR as a competitor and used underhand tactics to harm the success of the B&PR.

The B&PR opened the first part of its line in 1841, but faced with extremely difficult ground conditions when constructing a tunnel north of Chorley, it only opened from Bolton to a junction with the NUR at Euxton in 1843.

A bitter rate-cutting war with the NUR ensued, and the B&PR was forced to sell its line to the NUR in 1844. The NUR was taken over and became jointly owned by the London and North Western Railway and the Lancashire and Yorkshire Railway, but in 1888 the Bolton to Euxton section, the original B&PR line, was transferred to the L&YR. The main line is in operation as part of the Manchester to Preston main line.

== Proposal ==
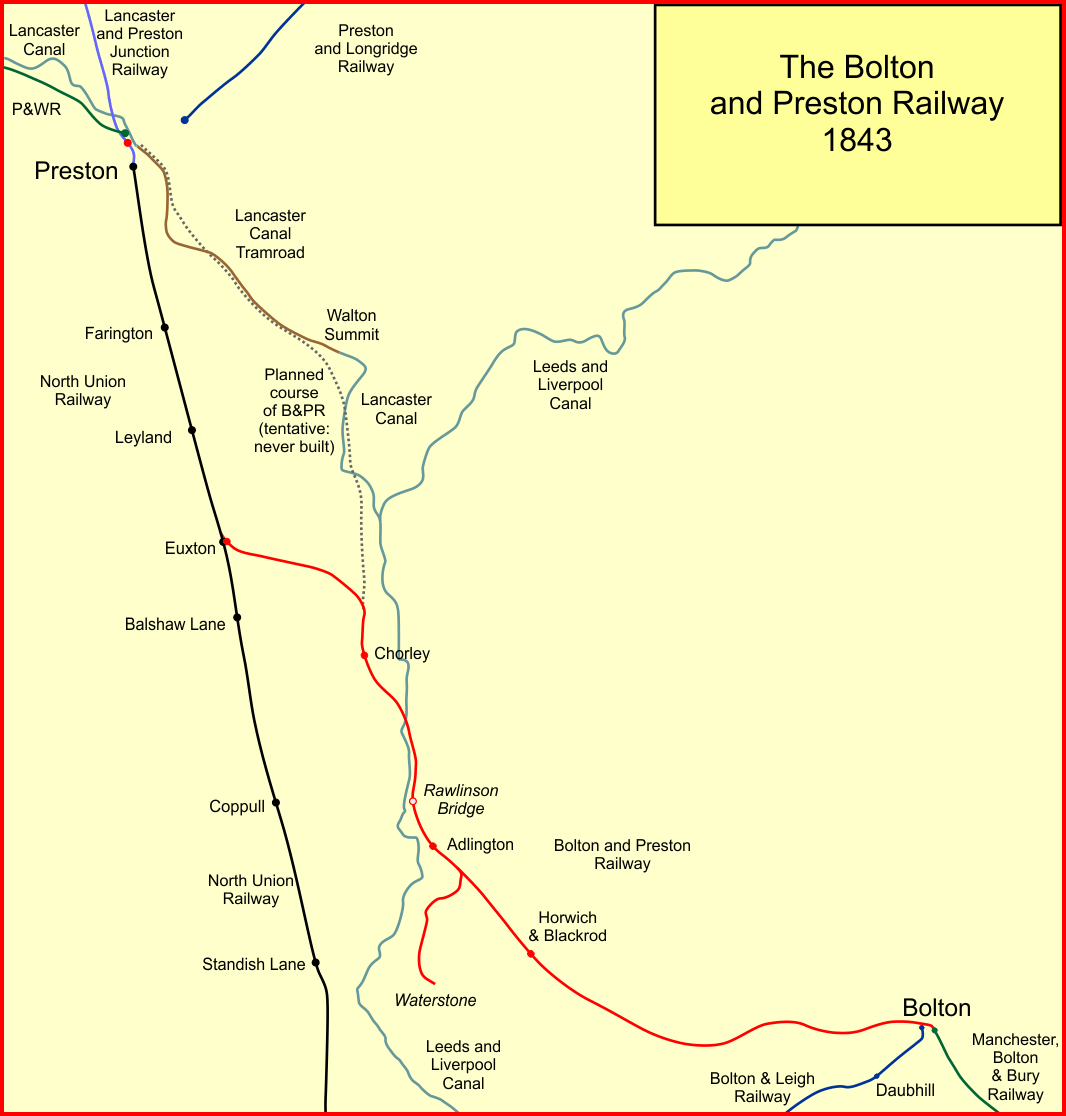
The Bolton and Preston Railway

In 1838 the North Union Railway opened its line from Parkside to Preston. Bolton and Preston had important commercial connections but the rail route between them involved a circuitous journey using the Bolton and Leigh Railway to Kenyon Junction and Parkside and the North Union Railway. A direct railway was proposed and a company was formed in 1836. The first chairman was Thomas Ridgway, a Horwich bleacher, and the chief engineer appointed to survey the line was John Urpeth Rastrick.

The line would form an end-on junction with the Manchester and Bolton Railway and run via Chorley and a 690-yard (630 m) tunnel to meet the Preston and Walton Plateway (Lancaster Canal Tramroad) near its southern terminus at Walton Summit. After following the route of the plateway for 1 1/2 miles (2.4 km), the new line would run into Preston, crossing the River Ribble and tunnelling under Fishergate, to terminate beside the Lancaster Canal basin, at a site occupied by Maxwell House.

The Preston and Walton Plateway had been built in 1803 to link the two portions of the Lancaster Canal across the deep valley of the Ribble. It was double track with a gauge of 5 ft (1,524 mm) to the outside of the plates, and was a little under 5 miles (8 km) in length. The line had three inclined planes. In Preston it ran down to the level of the Ribble, and then up to the canal terminating on an incline of 1 in 6, worked by a Boulton and Watt stationary engine and an endless chain.

== Construction ==
Bolton and Preston Railway Act 1837
- Act of Parliament
- Parliament of the United Kingdom
- Long title: An Act for making a Railway from Bolton le Moors to Preston in the County Palatine of Lancaster.
- Citation: 7 Will. 4 & 1 Vict. c. cxxi
- Territorial extent: United Kingdom

Dates
- Royal assent: 15 July 1837

Other legislation
- Relates to: Lancaster Canal Navigation Act 1819

The Bolton and Preston Railway Act 1837 (7 Will. 4 & 1 Vict. c. cxxi) obtained royal assent in summer of 1837. (Note: There is some dispute as to which month assent was granted. According to Holt & Biddle and Awdry it was on 15 June 1837 whereas Gregson, Marshall and Grant report it as 15 July 1837.) The B&PR was authorised to acquire the plateway, maintain it and keep it open. Parliament noted that the North Union Railway was under construction and that north of Chorley the B&PR would follow a closely parallel route. To protect the NUR, the B&PR was not permitted to construct this section until three years had elapsed. Capital was to be £380,000.

Reed observes that

This was one of the most complicated and lengthy railway Acts framed up to that time, and had 263 clauses for the 20-mile [32 km] line. It contained provisions which nullified each other yet left heavy financial commitments and sources of friction in the process; and it provided both the seeds of discord and the ground in which they could sprout and flourish.

Bolton and Preston Railway Company Act 1838
- Act of Parliament
- Parliament of the United Kingdom
- Long title: An Act for enabling the Bolton and Preston Railway Company to extend and alter the Line of such Railway, and to make collateral Branches thereto, and for amending and enlarging the Powers and Provisions of the Act relating thereto.
- Citation: 1 & 2 Vict. c. lvi

Dates
- Royal assent: 4 July 1838

Other legislation
- Amends: Bolton and Preston Railway Act 1837

Text of statute as originally enacted

The B&PR did not want to accept the delay and may have been deterred by the 1-in-6 gradient of the tramway on the north bank of the Ribble. A second survey by Joseph Jackson followed a different route north of Chorley, via a 300-yard-long (270 m) tunnel under the Chorley to Preston road and joined the NUR at Euxton. A second act, the Bolton and Preston Railway Company Act 1838 (1 & 2 Vict. c. lvi), was passed on 4 July 1838. It proved to be a mistake as running over the NUR was "on payment of a toll hereafter to be fixed."

The B&PR was to have a station in Preston adjacent to Maxwell House near the Victoria Hotel on the north side of Fishergate. Although track and a platform were built, the B&PR never used it for passengers but the Lancaster and Preston Junction Railway used it from 1 January 1842. The B&PR had to maintain the tramroad even though it was redundant. Thomas Swinburn was transferred from the Bolton and Leigh Railway to take charge of the tramroad, which remained in use until 1859.

Contracts were let for the line's construction from the end of 1838 as money became available, and on 24 December 1840 Sir Frederick Smith, from the Board of Trade inspected the line. He refused permission to open until gates and signals had been completed. On 26 December some company directors made a trial trip, and it opened as a single line from an end-on junction with the Manchester line at Bolton to a temporary terminus at Rawlinson Bridge on 4 February 1841. Rawlinson Bridge was 9 1/4 miles (14.9 km) from Bolton, where the turnpike road crossed the line, close to a canal bridge. In October 1840 agreement was concluded with the Manchester and Bolton Railway to supply engines and rolling stock and the line was extended to Chorley on 24 December 1841.

Bolton and Preston Railway Act 1842
- Act of Parliament
- Parliament of the United Kingdom
- Long title: An Act to facilitate the raising of Capital for the Completion of the Bolton and Preston Railway.
- Citation: 5 & 6 Vict. c. xv

Dates
- Royal assent: 13 May 1842

Text of statute as originally enacted

When work was started on the tunnel north of Chorley, it became obvious that the ground conditions were exceptionally difficult and work was temporarily abandoned until 3 June 1841 when John Stephenson was brought in. He had completed the Summit Tunnel on the Manchester and Leeds Railway. He undertook to complete the work in 15 months and stood to gain a premium of £1,500 if it was completed within 12 months. Stephenson, despite strenuous efforts, particularly in pumping ground water was unable to complete the work. In April 1842, Rastrick decided the tunnel would have to be abandoned and an open cutting built instead. The tunnel was reduced to 124 yards (113 m) beneath the Chorley to Preston road. In 1842 the B&PR had insufficient capital to complete the line and another act of Parliament, the Bolton and Preston Railway Act 1842 (5 & 6 Vict. c. xv) of 13 May 1842 increased the capital by £126,500.

Work on the cutting began in early June and within 13 months had been completed: it had a maximum depth of 80 feet (24 m), and involved the removal of 650,000 cubic yards (500,000 m^{3}) of earth. Track was laid with bridge-section rails, 49 pounds per yard (24 kg/m), on longitudinal timbers. According to a report by John Hawkshaw in 1850, 9 miles (14 km) of double track line had been laid with this type of rail on the B&PR and 4 miles (6 km) of 60 lb/yd (30 kg/m) doubleheaded section. General Pasley inspected the line for the Board of Trade, and it opened to Euxton Junction (North Union Junction) on 22 June 1843.

== Operation ==
The line was worked by the Manchester and Bolton Railway, who had agreed to work the Lancaster and Preston Junction Railway from 1 January 1842, intending to work from Manchester to Lancaster when the Bolton and Preston Railway was complete. The North Union Railway lost nearly all of its Bolton to Preston traffic because the B&PR had a shorter route from Manchester to Preston than that of the L&MR and the NUR together and the B&PR was a threat to its business. That the B&PR was dependent on the good will of the NUR for transit from Euxton to Preston gave the NUR an opportunity to harm its competitor's business.

In the first week the B&PR carried 3,697 passengers, but from the outset the NUR made difficulties, obstructing B&PR trains, sometimes causing delays at Preston of over half an hour. The NUR exacted a toll of one shilling per passenger for the 5 1/2 miles (8.9 km), and did what it could to hinder B&PR trains, even preventing their use of the Maxwell House station at Preston. The B&PR was paying £8,000 a year to lease the tramway and the station at Preston, neither of which was necessary, but were required by the acts of Parliament. The B&PR had intended to rely on the NUR for rolling stock and engines, but as cooperative working was not forthcoming, the B&PR made agreements with the Manchester and Bolton Railway, the Preston and Wyre Railway, and the Lancaster Canal Company (which had leased the Lancaster and Preston Junction Railway from 1 September 1842). By these agreements passengers could be booked from Manchester and Bolton to Lancaster or Fleetwood and vice versa without change of carriage.

The B&PR charged the same fares from Manchester to Preston as the NUR, but the NUR toll charge was disproportionate: in a single week the NUR toll amounted to about £120. The NUR reduced the first class fare from 7s 6d to 5s first, and a fortnight and later to 3s, and the other classes in proportion. The Manchester–Bolton–Preston companies were obliged to follow. The NUR toll was intolerable on the cheaper fares, and the B&PR directors decided to convey second and third-class passengers from Euxton to Preston by road coach and to apply to Parliament in the next session to revive the earlier powers to reach Preston along the course of the tramroad.

Bolton and Preston Railway Act 1844
- Act of Parliament
- Parliament of the United Kingdom
- Long title: An Act to effectuate the Sale by the Bolton and Preston Railway Company of their Railway and other Property and Effects to the North Union Railway Company; to incorporate with such last-mentioned Company the Proprietors of the Bolton and Preston Railway; and to consolidate Shares into Stock.
- Citation: 7 & 8 Vict. c. ii

Dates
- Royal assent: 10 May 1844

At a meeting of the B&PR on 28 October it was reported that the NUR had refused a revenue sharing arrangement of three-quarters via Bolton and one-quarter via Parkside, and later three-fifths via Bolton. In desperation the B&PR directors proposed amalgamating with the NUR, and at a NUR meeting held in Liverpool it was suggested that the amalgamation should be upon the basis of taking stock of the two companies. The NUR stock was £477,539 and that of the B&PR £262,002. Both companies' fares were restored their original prices on 1 January 1844 and at a general meeting of proprietors of the B&PR on 10 April the draft of the bill for amalgamation was approved. The Bolton and Preston Railway Act 1844 (7 & 8 Vict. c. ii) received royal assent on 10 May 1844.

== Takeover ==
From 1 January 1846 the NUR was leased jointly by the Grand Junction Railway (which merged into the London and North Western Railway, L&NWR, in July 1846) and the Manchester and Leeds Railway (renamed the Lancashire and Yorkshire Railway, L&YR, in 1847). The NUR continued as a wholly owned company until 1888 when it was absorbed by the LNWR and L&YR jointly, and by an act of Parliament, the London and North Western Railway Act 1889 (52 & 53 Vict. c. xcviii) of 26 July 1889, the portions south of Euxton Junction were transferred to the ownership of the companies that used them: Bolton to Euxton Junction, the only part of the Bolton and Preston Railway built became exclusively owned by the L&YR.

The Waterhouse branch, serving several collieries to the south just over 8 miles (13 km) from Bolton, opened some time between 1849 and 1894.

== Later years ==
The Bolton to Euxton line, an important element in the trunk route from Manchester to the north, remained in use through several changes of ownership. The Lancashire and Yorkshire Railway merged with the LNWR in 1922, and the Grouping of the railways followed a year later, under the Railways Act 1921. The line is in use as a major route and was electrified in 2019. The Waterhouse branch has closed, as has the Preston (Maxwell House) station and its approach route.

== Stations ==
The original stations on the B&PR were:

- Bolton built by the Manchester and Bolton Railway opened on 29 May 1838.
- Blackrod, opened 4 February 1841 (it may have been named Horwich and Blackrod which was used in timetables) was renamed Horwich Junction on 14 February 1870, renamed Horwich and Blackrod Junction on 11 February 1873 and Blackrod on 16 April 1888, it is still open.
- Rawlinson Bridge, the original terminus opened 4 February 1841 and closed on 22 December 1841.
- Adlington, opened 22 December 1841.
- Chorley, opened on 22 December 1841.
- Euxton, opened on 22 June 1843 and closed on 2 April 1917.
- Lostock Lane and Lostock Junction are difficult to document, Quick (2022) states:

Lostock Lane and Lostock Junction (opening): Lostock Lane first appears in Bradshaw in November 1846: Lancashire and Yorkshire Railway (L&YR) distance diagram of 1851 shows it well west of junction, on way to Horwich; in September 1852 Bradshaw it was replaced by Lostock Junction, timing same, suggesting perhaps just renaming, but diagram evidence makes it clear that was different site. In February 1856 Lostock Lane returned to Bradshaw but had been included in co n of alterations (quoting the Manchester Courier), Lostock Junction still present.

Lostock Lane closed on 1 June 1879. and Lostock Junction on 7 November 1966. A new Lostock (or Lostock Parkway in first timetable) opened 16 May 1988 on the site of the former Lostock Junction.

- Chorley Royal Ordnance Factory Platform opened on 24 January 1938 and was renamed Chorley Halt sometime before May 1942. It closed 31 August 1964. The station reopened as Buckshaw Parkway on 3 October 2011.
- Horwich Parkway opened on 30 May 1999.

The convergence with the line from Wigan known as Euxton Junction was situated to the north of both the B&P and the North Union Euxton stations.

== Bibliography ==
- Awdry, Christopher (1990). Encyclopaedia of British Railway Companies. Sparkford: Patrick Stephens Ltd. ISBN 1-8526-0049-7. OCLC 19514063. CN 8983.
- Bradshaw, George (2012) [March 1850]. Bradshaw's Rail Times for Great Britain and Ireland March 1850: A reprint of the classic timetable complete with period advertisements and shipping connections to all parts. Midhurst: Middleton Press. ISBN 9781908174130.
- Cobb, Col M H (2002). The Railways of Great Britain: A Historical Atlas. Shepperton: Ian Allan Limited.
- Grant, Donald J. (2017). Directory of the Railway Companies of Great Britain (1st ed.). Kibworth Beauchamp, Leicestershire: Troubador Publishing Ltd. ISBN 978-1-78803-768-6.
- Gregson, Bob (2012). The London and North Western Railway around Preston. Preston: Atkinson Publications Limited. ISBN 978-1909-134027.
- Greville, M.D. (1953). "Chronology of the Railways of Lancashire, 1828 - 1939: Reprint from the Transactions of the Historic Society of Lancashire and Cheshire". Transactions of the Historic Society of Lancashire and Cheshire. 105: 196.
- Greville, M.D.; Holt, G.O. (February 1960). "Railway Development in Preston part 1" (PDF). Railway Magazine. 106 (706).
- Holt, Geoffrey O.; Biddle, Gordon (1986). The North West. A Regional history of the railways of Great Britain. Vol. 10 (2nd ed.). David St. John Thomas. ISBN 978-0-946537-34-1. OCLC 643506870.
- Jowett, Alan (March 1989). Jowett's Railway Atlas of Great Britain and Ireland: From Pre-Grouping to the Present Day (1st ed.). Sparkford: Patrick Stephens Ltd. ISBN 978-1-85260-086-0. OCLC 22311137.
- Marshall, John (1969). The Lancashire and Yorkshire Railway: volume 1. Newton Abbot: David & Charles. ISBN 0-7153-4352-1.
- Quick, Michael (2022) [2001]. Railway passenger stations in Great Britain: a chronology (PDF). version 5.04. Railway & Canal Historical Society. Archived from the original (PDF) on 25 November 2022.
- The Railway Clearing House (1970) [1904]. The Railway Clearing House Handbook of Railway Stations 1904 (1970 D&C Reprint ed.). Newton Abbot: David & Charles Reprints. ISBN 0-7153-5120-6.
- Reed, Brian (1969). Crewe to Carlisle. London: Ian Allan. SBN 7110 0057 3.
