= Listed buildings in Blackrod =

Blackrod is a civil parish in the Metropolitan Borough of Bolton, Greater Manchester, England. It contains 13 listed buildings that are recorded in the National Heritage List for England. All the listed buildings are designated at Grade II, the lowest of the three grades, which is applied to "buildings of national importance and special interest". The parish is partly residential but mainly rural. The Leeds and Liverpool Canal passes through the parish and there are five listed buildings associated with it, an aqueduct and four bridges. The other listed buildings are a former country house and associated structures, farmhouses, a hotel, a church, and a war memorial.

== Buildings ==
Name and location	Photograph	Date	Notes
St Katharine's Church; 53.59476°N 2.58585°W		16th century	The oldest part of the church is the lower part of the tower, and it was completed in stages up to 1837. The chancel and eastern part of the nave were rebuilt in 1905, and the rest of the church in 1911. The church is built in stone with a slate roof, and consists of a nave, a north aisle, a south porch, a north vestry, a chancel, and an embraced west tower. The tower has four stages, diagonal buttresses, a four-light late Perpendicular west window, paired bell openings with pointed arches, a clock face on each front, and an embattled parapet with corner pinnacles. To the north is a rectangular stair turret with external steps.
Green Barn Farmhouse; 53.58612°N 2.57353°W	—	1704	The farmhouse was later extended with a bay to the left. The house is in stone with quoins and a concrete tile roof. The original part has two storeys with attics and two bays, and contains replaced windows. In the attics are gabled dormers with mullioned windows. The left bay has two storeys, a casement window on the ground floor, and a mullioned window above. On the front is a gabled porch with three ball finials, and at the rear are more mullioned windows.
Holmes Farmhouse; 53.59232°N 2.60060°W	—	1721	A stone farmhouse with quoins and a stone-slate roof with coped gables. There are two storeys and two bays, and the windows are mullioned.
Arley Hall; 53.59134°N 2.62245°W		18th century	Originally a country house and later used for other purposes, it is stuccoed with stone dressings, and has a top cornice and a pierced traceried parapet. The garden front has two storeys and seven bays, with the central bay canted, and the outer bays having shaped gables and finials. The windows are casements with segmental-headed lights. The moated site on which the house stands is a scheduled monument.
Coach House, Arley Hall; 53.59111°N 2.62300°W	—	18th century	The coach house and stables are in brick with a stone base and dressings, and a concrete tile roof. There are eleven bays, and the building contains mullioned windows, entrances with elliptical heads and keystones, bull's eyes windows, a Tudor arched window, and a mounting block.
Folly, Arley Hall; 53.59133°N 2.62372°W	—	18th century	The folly is in stone, and consists of a small tower with buttresses. It has three stages, and contains windows with pointed heads in the middle stage. The parapet contains small lights and has corner turrets, and there are flanking walls with an embattled parapet.
Georgian House Hotel; 53.57657°N 2.56039°W		Late 18th century	Originally a house, later a hotel, it is in Georgian style. The building is in brick with stucco and stone dressings, a top cornice, and a stuccoed parapet in the centre. The roof is tiled and is hipped over the wings. The central part has three storeys and three bays, and is flanked by recessed wings with two storeys and four bays, the two end bays projecting forward. The windows are sashes with wedge lintels. The entrance in the centre has an architrave, and the outer entrances have wedge lintels.
Aberdeen Bridge; 53.60176°N 2.61334°W		1790s	An accommodation bridge over the Leeds and Liverpool Canal, it is in stone, and consists of a single elliptical arch. The bridge has a triple keystone, a raised band, and a parapet.
Anderton Bridge; 53.59801°N 2.61438°W		1790s	An accommodation bridge over the Leeds and Liverpool Canal, it is in stone, and consists of a single elliptical arch. The bridge has a triple keystone, a raised band, and a parapet.
Aqueduct over River Douglas; 53.60671°N 2.60630°W		1790s	The aqueduct carries the Leeds and Liverpool Canal over the River Douglas. It is in stone, and consists of a single round arch with a cornice and a coped parapet. The abutments are swept out at base, and there is a towpath on both sides of the canal.
Bridge No. 64; 53.59092°N 2.62189°W		1790s	The bridge carries Arley Lane over the Leeds and Liverpool Canal. It is in stone, and consists of a single elliptical arch. The bridge has a triple keystone, a raised band, and a parapet.
Waterhouse Bridge; 53.60511°N 2.60906°W		1790s	An accommodation bridge over the Leeds and Liverpool Canal, it is in stone, and consists of a single elliptical arch. The bridge has a keystone, a raised band, and a parapet.
War memorial 53.58921°N 2.57460°W		1925	The war memorial stands in Blackrod Cemetery. It is in sandstone and is a cenotaph about 12 feet (3.7 m) tall. It consists of a shaft with canted sides on a pedestal, standing on a plinth and a rectangular dais, and surrounded by a paved and kerbed area. At the top is a pediment and a frieze, both inscribed, and on the front and the back of the shaft are panels with inscriptions and the names of those lost in both World Wars. There are also two tablets inscribed with more names.
