= Blackrod Urban District =

Geographic area of England

Coordinates: 53.5898°N 2.5809°W

- Area
  - 1911: 2,392 acres (9.7 km^{2})
  - 1961: 2,392 acres (9.7 km^{2})
- Population
  - 1891: 4,021
  - 1971: 4,805
- History
  - Created: 1872
  - Abolished: 1974
  - Succeeded by: Metropolitan Borough of Bolton
- Status: Local board (1872–1894); Urban district (1894–1974)

Blackrod was, from 1872 to 1974, a local government district centred on the village of Blackrod in the administrative county of Lancashire, England.

== History ==
Blackrod was a township and chapelry in the civil and ecclesiastical parish of Bolton le Moors in the Salford Hundred of Lancashire. The township became part of the Wigan Poor Law Union on 1 February 1837 which took responsibility for funding the Poor Law within that Union area. In 1866, Blackrod was given the status of a civil parish.

A resolution for the adoption of the Local Government Act 1858 was passed on 9 May 1872 by the owners and ratepayers of the township of Blackrod, and a local board was created to provide for the water supply and drainage of the township. After the Public Health Act 1875 was passed by Parliament in that year, Blackrod Local Board assumed extra duties as an urban sanitary district, although the Local Board's title did not change.

Following the implementation of the Local Government Act 1894, Blackrod Local Board was transformed into an elected urban district council of nine members. Blackrod Urban District Council had three electoral wards: Central, North, and South, each represented by three councillors.

Under the Local Government Act 1972, Blackrod Urban District was abolished on 1 April 1974 and its former area became a successor parish in the Metropolitan Borough of Bolton in Greater Manchester.

== Demography ==
Population changes of Blackrod, 1891–1971

Year	Population	±%
1891	4,021	—
1901	3,875	−3.6%
1911	3,896	+0.5%

Year	Population	±%
1921	3,867	−0.7%
1931	3,599	−6.9%
1939	3,072	−14.6%

Year	Population	±%
1951	3,153	+2.6%
1961	3,606	+14.4%
1971	4,805	+33.3%

Sources: Urban Sanitary District (USD) 1891. Urban District (UD) 1901–1971.

== Lists of office holders ==
=== Chairmen of Blackrod Local Board ===
Chairmen of Blackrod Local Board
Name	Party	Tenure	Notes
Henry Smith	—	1872–1873	He was later Medical Officer of Health for Blackrod Local Board.
Benjamin Davies	Conservative	1873–1881	He was a member the first Board of Governors of Rivington and Blackrod Grammar School in 1875.
James Eckersley	Conservative	1881–1894	Last Chairman of Blackrod Local Board.

=== Chairmen of Blackrod Urban District Council ===
Chairmen of Blackrod Urban District Council
Name	Party	Tenure	Notes
James Eckersley	Conservative	1894–1901	First Chairman of Blackrod Urban District Council.
John Unsworth	Liberal	1901–1907	Previously Chairman of Westhoughton Local Board: 1893-94.
The Rev. George Worsley Coleman	—	1907–1910	Also was Vicar of St Katharine's Church, Blackrod: 1900–1911.
Edward Cherry	Liberal	1910–1916	1st term.
Robert Berry	Labour	1916–1919	
Aaron Helme	—	1919–1922	
Adam Brindle	Conservative	1922–1925	
William Metcalfe	—	1925–1927	
Albert Worthington	Independent	1927–1930	1st term.
Ellis Atkinson	—	1930–1933	
William Edward Moss	—	1933–1934	
John Kellett	—	1934–1938	
Edward Cherry	Liberal	1938–1939	2nd term.
Albert Worthington	Independent	1939–1940	2nd term.
Thomas Roocroft	Labour	1940–1941	1st term.
Harry Fowles	Independent	1941–1942	
Joseph Jolley	Independent	1942–1943	1st term.
Thomas Booth	Labour	1943–1944	1st term.
John Pilkington	—	1944–1945	
Rupert Henry Capper	—	1945–1946	
Edward Cherry	Liberal	1946–1947	3rd term.
Thomas Roocroft	Labour	1947–1948	2nd term.
Albert Worthington	Independent	1948–1949	3rd term.
Joseph Jolley	Conservative	1949–1950	2nd term.
Thomas Booth	Labour	1950–1951	2nd term.
John Marshall	Conservative	1951–1952	1st term.
James Hodge	—	1952–1953	1st term.
Thomas Roocroft	Labour	1953–1954	3rd term.
Harry Jones	—	1954–1955	
Joseph Jolley	Conservative	1955–1956	3rd term.
Thomas Booth	Labour	1956–1957	3rd term.
Christopher Charles Cutler	Conservative	1957–1958	1st term.
James Hodge	—	1958–1959	2nd term.
Thomas Roocroft	Labour	1959–1960	4th term. Died in office.
Walter Chadwick	Independent	1960–1961	
Joseph Jolley	Conservative	1961–1962	4th term.
Thomas Booth	Labour	1962–1963	4th term.
Christopher Charles Cutler	Conservative	1963–1964	2nd term.
John Marshall	Conservative	1964–1965	2nd term.
Joseph Jolley	Conservative	1965–1966	5th term.
John Foster	Labour	1966–1967	
Christopher Charles Cutler	Conservative	1967–1968	3rd term.
John Marshall	Conservative	1968–1969	3rd term.
Joseph Jolley	Conservative	1969–1970	6th term. Later Mayor of Blackrod: 1979–80.
Reginald Winstanley	Conservative	1970–1971	
Constance Mary Everin	Conservative	1971–1972	Later Mayor of Blackrod: 1977–78, 1982–83.
Lancelot Watkinson	Labour	1972–1973	Later Mayor of Blackrod: 1985–86.
George Arthur Gardiner	Labour	1973–1974	Last Chairman of Blackrod Urban District Council. First Mayor of Blackrod: 1974–75.
