= Toughsheet Community Stadium =

English association football stadium in Bolton

Coordinates: 53°34′50″N 2°32′08″W

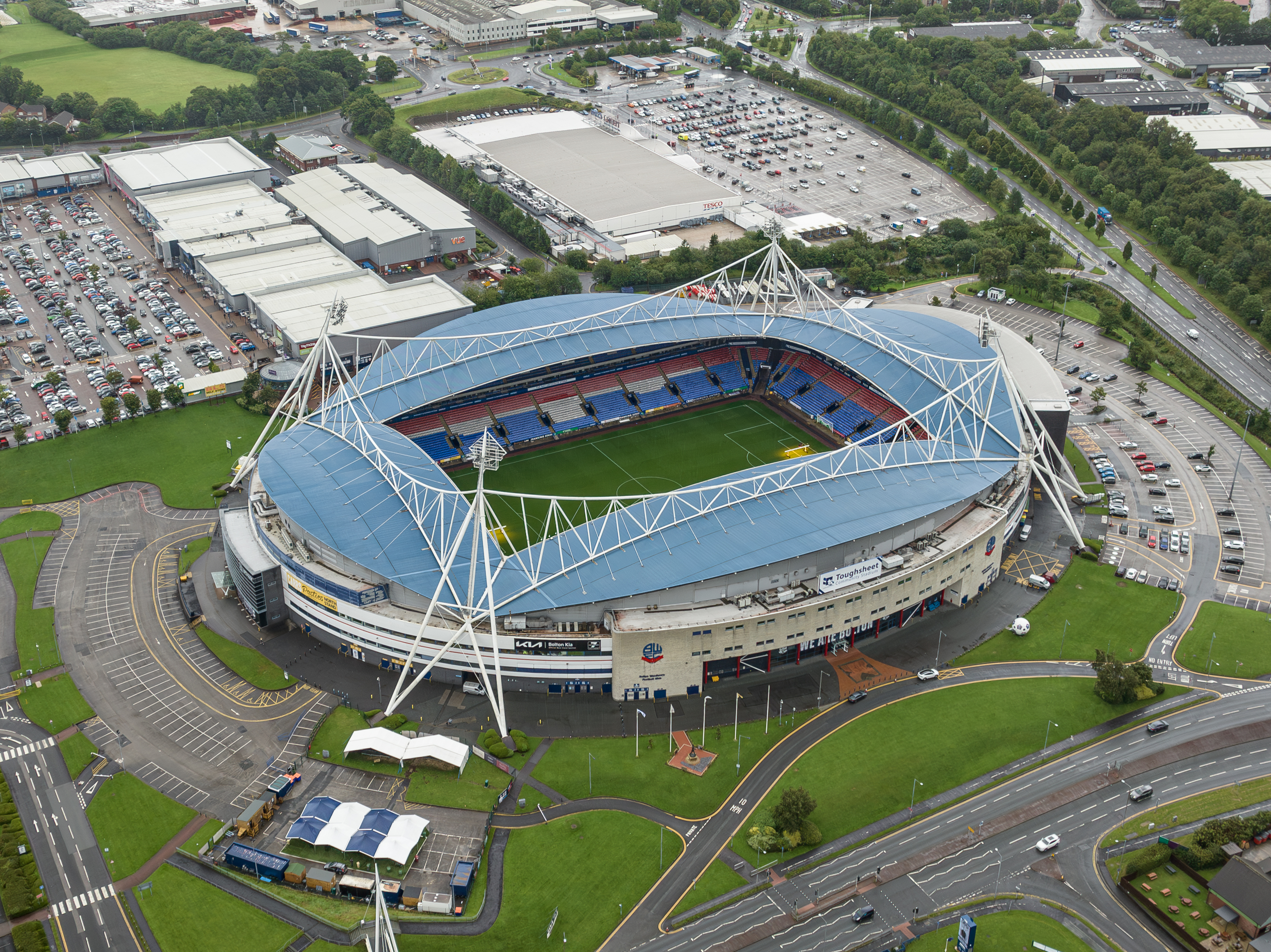
- Interactive map of Toughsheet Community Stadium
- Full name: Toughsheet Community Stadium
- Former names: University of Bolton Stadium (2018–2023); Macron Stadium (2014–2018); Reebok Stadium (1997–2014)
- Location: Burnden Way; Horwich; Bolton BL6 6JW; England
- Owner: Bolton Wanderers
- Operator: Bolton Wanderers (1997–present)
- Capacity: 28,723 (sports); 40,000 (concerts)
- Surface: GrassMaster
- Record attendance: 28,353 (sports); 34,731 (concert)
- Field size: 110 x 72 yards (100.6 x 65.8 metres)
- Public transit: Horwich Parkway

Construction
- Built: 1996–1997
- Opened: 1997; 29 years ago
- Cost: £25m
- Architect: Populous

Tenant
- Bolton Wanderers (1997–present)

Website
- bwfc.co.uk/stadium

The Toughsheet Community Stadium is a football stadium in Horwich, Bolton, Greater Manchester, England. It is the home ground of Bolton Wanderers Football Club, with an all-seated capacity of 28,001.

Opening in 1997, it was originally named the Reebok Stadium, after club sponsors Reebok. It initially had a capacity of 25,000. In 2014, Bolton Wanderers signed a naming rights deal with Italian sportswear company Macron. It was renamed the University of Bolton Stadium in 2018. From 1 July 2023 it became known as the Toughsheet Community Stadium, after a Bolton-based recyclable building product manufacturer.

A hotel forms part of the stadium and some of the rooms offer views of the pitch.

== History ==
The stadium is an all-seater stadium with a capacity of 28,001 and was completed in 1997, replacing the club's old ground, Burnden Park.

By the 1980s, Burnden Park, which at its peak had held over 60,000 spectators, was becoming increasingly dilapidated, and a section of terracing was sold off for redevelopment as a supermarket to help pay off the club's rising debts, not helped by falling attendances as the club slid into the lower divisions. The stadium’s capacity was eventually reduced to just over 20,000.

Bolton Wanderers had dropped into the Third Division in 1983 and later spent a season in the Fourth Division. In January 1990, the Taylor Report required all clubs in the top two divisions of the English league to have an all-seater stadium by the 1994-95 season. Bolton were still in the Third Division at that stage, but were aiming for promotion - which was finally achieved in 1993. By that time, the club's owners had decided to relocate to a new all-seater stadium away from Burnden Park and, by 1995, had identified a location at Horwich as the preferred site of a new stadium.

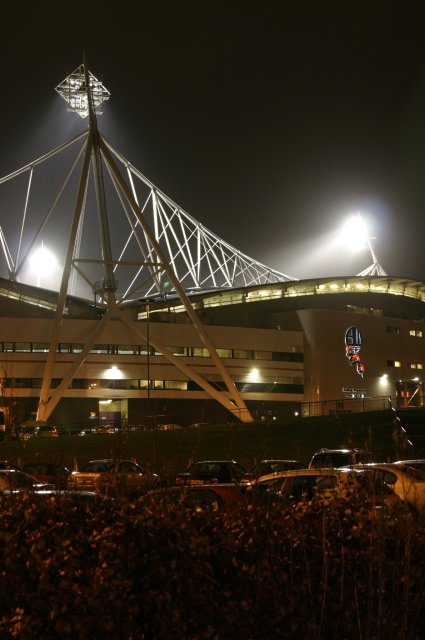
View at night, February 2005

The lead consultant/architect of the project was Lobb Sports, while local firm Bradshaw Gass & Hope acted as planning supervisors and quantity surveyors. The contractor was Birse Construction, and Deakin Callard & Partners provided structural engineering services. The value of the contract was £25 million (US$42.1 million). The stadium is noted for its distinctive gabled architecture, first pioneered by the Kirklees Stadium.

Work began on building the new stadium in 1996, and the stadium was opened in 1997 by John Prescott, a Labour Party politician, who was the Deputy Prime Minister of the United Kingdom at the time.

The stadium consists of four stands: The Carrs Pasties (North) Stand at one end; the South Stand (Franking Sense and also the away end) at the other end; the Kia (West) Stand at one side of the pitch; and the Nat Lofthouse (east) Stand on the other side.

When the stadium was named after long-time team sponsor Reebok in 1997, fans considered the title impersonal and believed that too much emphasis was being placed on financial considerations. That opposition lessened considerably after the stadium was built, as fans grew accustomed to the name and were bolstered by Reebok's status as a local company.

The Macron branding was applied in July 2014, after the Bolton Wanderers club finalised a partnership with the large Italian sportswear brand. In April 2014, long-serving club chairman Phil Gartside stated that he was "proud" to be associated with Macron and had "been very impressed with their [Macron's] passion for football". A four-year duration was negotiated for the Macron deal and the club had the option to extend at completion.

When the deal with Macron came to an end in August 2018, the stadium was again renamed, this time as the University of Bolton Stadium.

On 1 July 2023, the stadium name was changed to The Toughsheet Community Stadium, with the deal set to last for five years.

On 30 September 2026, it was announced that certain areas of the stadium would become safe standing areas, with the club hoping to have the changes in place by the time they face Middlesbrough a month later.

The club also stated that away supporters would now be moved to the upper tier of the South Stand in the most significant changes to the seating areas since the stadium opened almost three decades ago.

== Footballing firsts ==
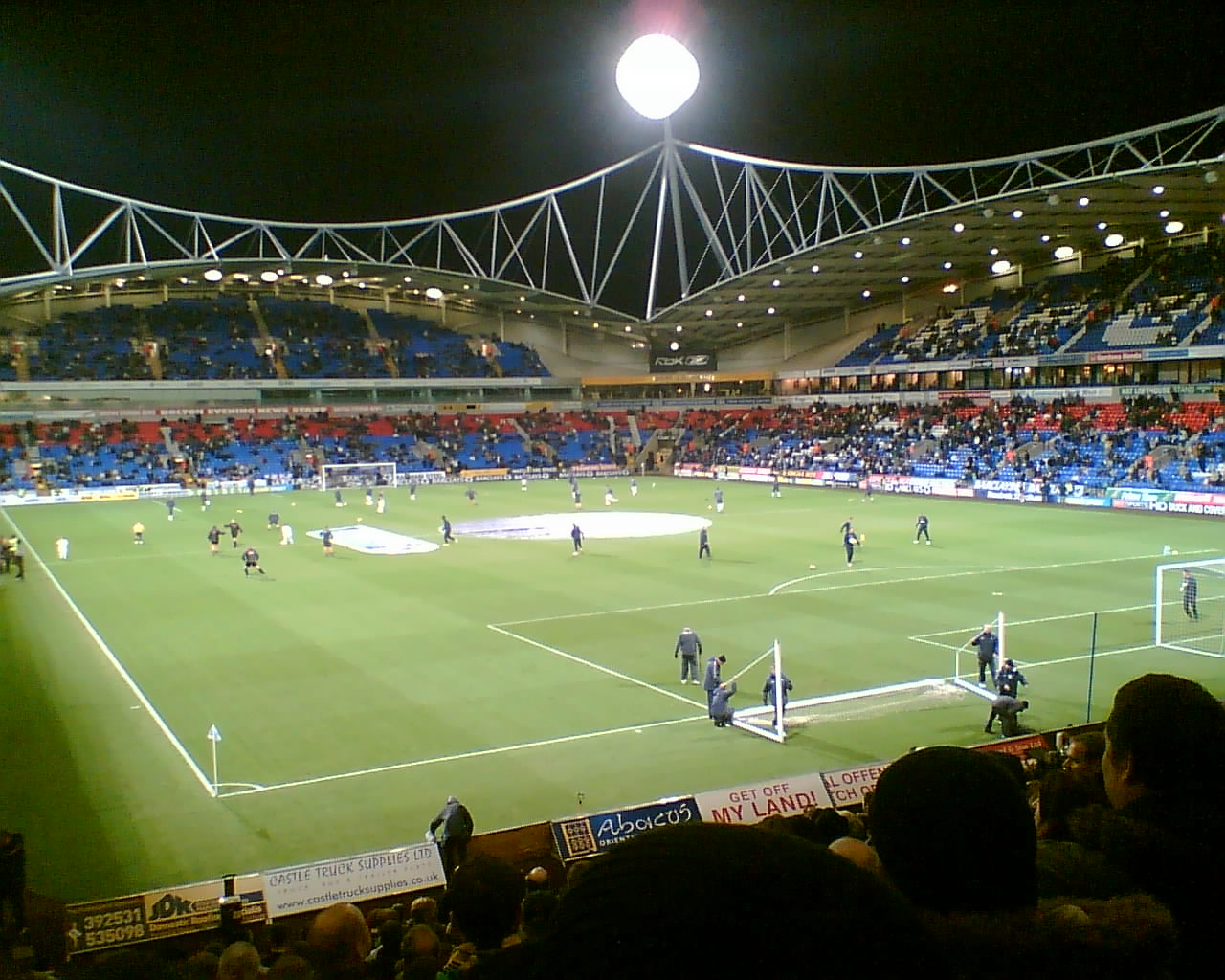
Interior view prior to a Bolton v Arsenal match, February 2007

- The first competitive – and Premier League – match at the stadium was a 0–0 draw between Bolton and Everton on Monday 1 September 1997. Bolton's Gerry Taggart had a header that crossed the line wrongly ruled out, and the points it would have won would have saved Bolton from relegation at Everton's expense.
- The first player to score at the stadium was Alan Thompson, a penalty in the 1–1 draw against Tottenham Hotspur, on 23 September. Chris Armstrong, who later in his career had a short spell with Wanderers, got the equaliser.
- On 6 September 2002, it hosted its first international, a friendly between England under-21 and Yugoslavia under-21. It ended in a 1–1 draw with 10,531 in attendance. Visitor Danko Lazović scored the first goal and Shaun Wright-Phillips equalised. 22 years later, it hosted another England under-21 match against Luxembourg under-21.
- Lokomotiv Plovdiv were the visitors in the first UEFA Cup match at the stadium, on 15 September 2005. Boban Janchevski scored first for the visitors, but late goals from El Hadji Diouf and Jared Borgetti secured a 2–1 home victory in the first competitive European match in Bolton's history.
- Bolton Wanderers Women first played at the stadium against Preston North End on 20 April 2025, selling more than 2000 tickets. In winning the match, the women were crowned champions of the North West Regional Division One North.

== Other events ==
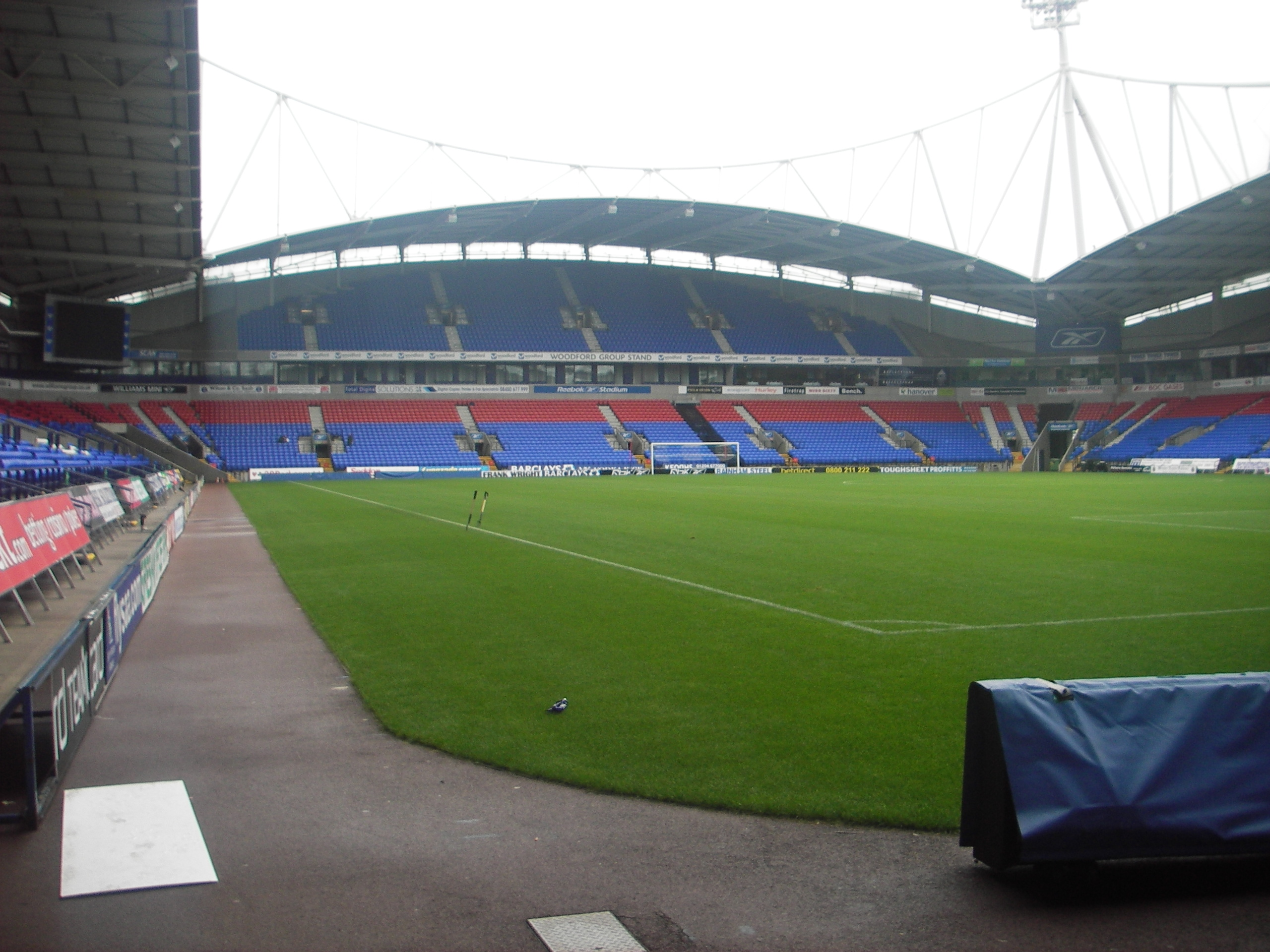
Field and grandstands view, August 2005

The stadium has hosted concerts by Oasis, Pink, Elton John, Coldplay, the Killers, Little Mix and Rod Stewart. The music video for Coldplay's 2005 single "Fix You" uses footage filmed at their Horwich concerts. The track was performed twice on each night so enough footage could be captured.

The stadium also hosted the UK Open Darts Championship, boxing matches with local boxer Amir Khan and in 2011 Premiership rugby union, when Sale Sharks lost to London Irish. It also hosted a group match of the Rugby League World Cup in 2022.

The venue's Premier Suite is home to the UK's leading amateur mixed martial arts event, Full Contact Contender.

In August 2019, the stadium hosted a campaign rally by Labour Party leader Jeremy Corbyn.

In March and April 2021, the stadium held Crown Court cases due to the large amount that had built up as a result of the COVID-19 pandemic whilst the actual Courts were closed. In the same year it was a venue for COVID-19 vaccinations.

=== Snooker ===
A professional snooker tournament, the 2021 Champion of Champions, was hosted at the stadium between 15 and 21 November 2021.

=== Rugby League ===
The stadium has also hosted seven rugby league matches.

==== Rugby League Test Matches ====
| Test# | Date | Result | Attendance | Notes |
|---|---|---|---|---|
| 1 | 7 November 1998 | New Zealand def. Great Britain 36–16 | 27,486 | 1998 Great Britain vs New Zealand series |
| 1 | 18 November 2000 | New Zealand def. England 49–6 | 16,032 | 2000 Rugby League World Cup semi-final |
| 3 | 17 November 2001 | Australia def. Great Britain 40–12 | 22,152 | 2001 Ashes series |
| 4 | 22 October 2022 (Note: Originally meant to be on 30 October 2021, but the competition was postponed to 2022 due to the COVID-19 pandemic.) | England def. France 42–18 | 23,648 | 2021 Rugby League World Cup Group A |

==== World Club Challenge ====
| Game | Date | Result | Attendance | Year |
|---|---|---|---|---|
| 1 | 26 January 2001 | St. Helens def. Brisbane Broncos 20–18 | 16,041 | 2001 World Club Challenge |
| 2 | 14 February 2003 | Sydney Roosters def. St. Helens 38–0 | 19,807 | 2003 World Club Challenge |
| 3 | 23 February 2007 | St. Helens def. Brisbane Broncos 18–14 | 23,207 | 2007 World Club Challenge |

==== Challenge Cup ====
In 2018, the stadium hosted the first ever double-header semi-finals of the Challenge Cup, repeated in 2019.

=== Bolton Wanderers Free School ===
In 2014, the club established Bolton Wanderers Free School at the stadium. It was a sixth form centre offering sports and related courses for 16- to 19-year-olds, and utilised the facilities of the stadium for most of its teaching and learning. However, this closed in 2017 due to low pupil numbers which made it 'not financially viable'.

== Attendances ==
=== Record attendances ===
- Record attendance: 28,353 v Leicester City, 28 December 2003 (FA Premier League)
- Lowest attendance for a competitive match: 1,540 v Everton U23s, 30 August 2016 Northern Section Group Stage, Game One
- Lowest Premier League attendance: 17,014 v Derby County, 2 January 2008
- Record UEFA Cup attendance: 26,163 v Atlético Madrid, 14 February 2008 Last 32 1st leg
- Record FA Cup attendance: 23,523 v Arsenal, 12 March 2005 Quarter finals
- Record League Cup attendance: 20,064 v Aston Villa, 23 August 2022, Second Round
- Record EFL Trophy attendance: 9,062 v Bradford City, 3 September 2019 Northern Section Group Stage, Game One

=== Average attendances ===
| Season | Division | League Average | European Average | FA Cup Average | League Cup Average | EFL Trophy Average | Play-off Average |
| 2000–01 | First Division | 14,960 | | 14,982 | 4,957 | | 23,515 |
| 2001–02 | Premier League | 25,098 | | | 7,015 | | |
| 2002–03 | Premier League | 25,016 | | 10,123 | 12,621 | | |
| 2003–04 | Premier League | 26,794 | | 8,759 | 10,191 | | |
| 2004–05 | Premier League | 26,005 | | 19,837 | 18,037 | | |
| 2005–06 | Premier League | 25,265 | 17,635 | 15,223 | 11,997 | | |
| 2006–07 | Premier League | 23,606 | | 21,088 | | | |
| 2007–08 | Premier League | 20,901 | 18,367 | 15,286 | 15,510 | | |
| 2008–09 | Premier League | 22,485 | | | 7,136 | | |
| 2009–10 | Premier League | 21,880 | | 13,120 | 8,050 | | |
| 2010–11 | Premier League | 22,869 | | 14,035 | | | |
| 2011–12 | Premier League | 23,670 | | 10,532 | 6,777 | | |
| 2012–13 | Championship | 18,034 | | 15,482 | | | |
| 2013–14 | Championship | 16,141 | | 11,965 | | | |
| 2014–15 | Championship | 15,413 | | 19,480 | 9,249 | | |
| 2015–16 | Championship | 15,056 | | 12,812 | 5,842 | | |
| 2016–17 | League One | 15,194 | | 8,453 | | 1,565 | |
| 2017–18 | Championship | 15,887 | | 11,574 | 6,385 | | |
| 2018–19 | Championship | 14,239 | | 5,506 | | | |
| 2019–20 | League One | 12,028 | | 6,992 | | 5,839 | |
| 2020–21 (Note: All matches played behind closed doors due to the COVID-19 pandemic.) | League Two | N/A | | N/A | N/A | N/A | |
| 2021–22 | League One | 16,104 | | 11,183 | 7,147 | 2,332 | |
| 2022–23 | League One | 18,813 | | 5,999 | 13,284 | 3,316 | 23,450 |
| 2023–24 | League One | 21,022 | | 7,369 | 6,747 | 2,713 | 24,518 |
| 2024–25 | League One | 21,325 | | | 4,131 | 1,725 | |
| 2025-26 | League One | 21,692 | | 6,077 | 8,208 | 2,320 | 22,789 |

== Nat Lofthouse statue ==
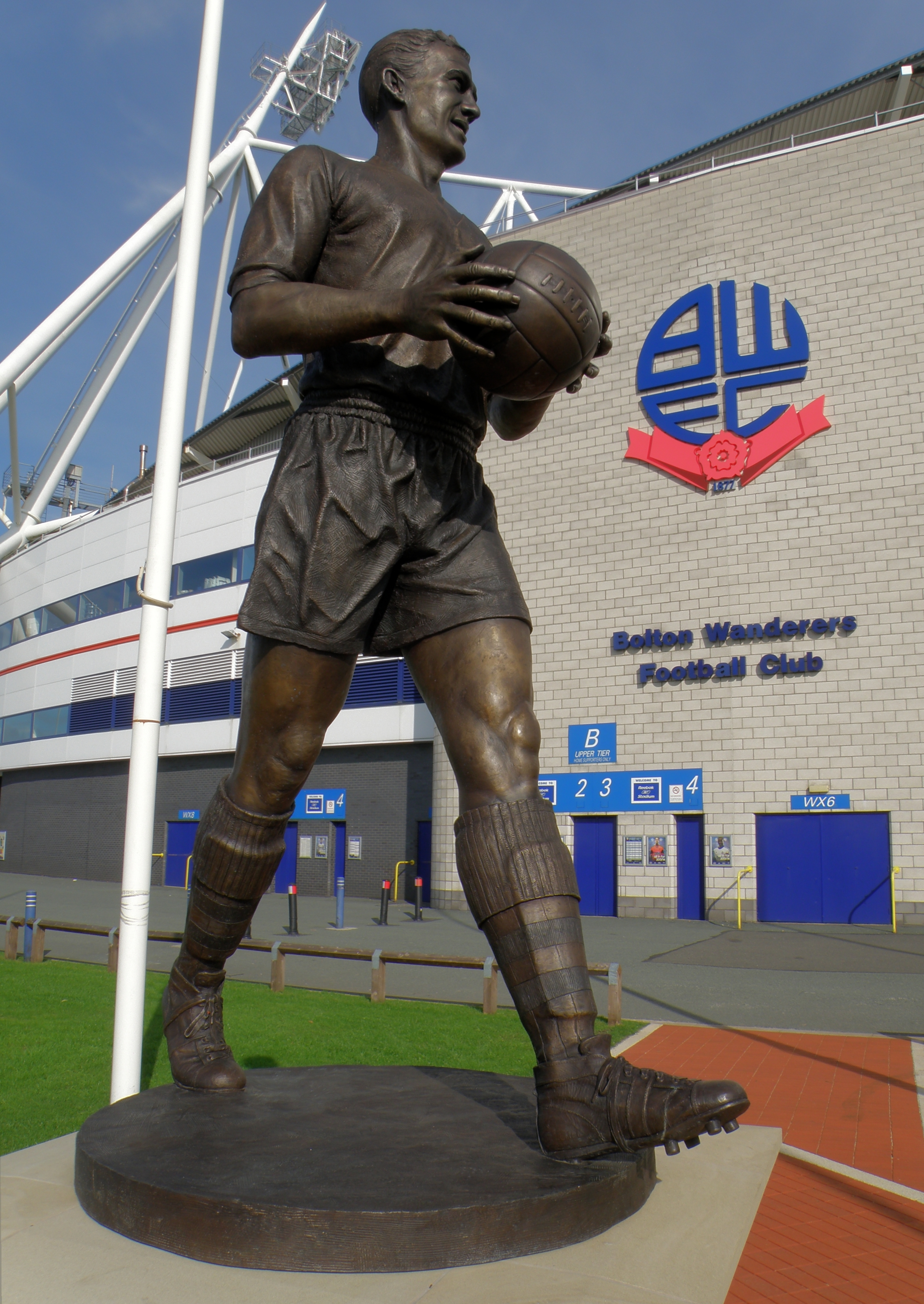
Lofthouse's statue outside the stadium

Bolton Wanderers unveiled a bronze statue of their most famous player, Nat Lofthouse (1925–2011), prior to a game against Queens Park Rangers on 24 August 2013. The statue, which cost £100,000 and funded via the generosity of public donations and sponsors, is situated near to the south-west corner of the stadium and was officially revealed by club owner Eddie Davies in a special ceremony.

Club chaplain Phil Mason, chairman Phil Gartside and the son of Nat Lofthouse – Jeff Lofthouse, also took part in the ceremony as did sculptor Sean Hedges-Quinn. Hedges-Quinn had taken 18 months overall to complete the project having worked successfully on the statues such as that of Bob Stokoe at The Stadium of Light, Ted Bates at St Mary's Stadium and Sir Bobby Robson and Alf Ramsey at Portman Road.

== Transport ==
The stadium's West Stand lies about 200 metres from Horwich Parkway railway station situated between Lostock and Blackrod on the Manchester to Preston Line. Football specials used to operate to and from the station on matchdays, but not in recent years. When the team play at home, bus services are laid on by the club from across the borough.

On non-matchdays, Horwich Parkway is served by two trains an hour in each direction, operated by Northern. Numerous routes serve bus stops near or at the ground, operated by TfGM under the Bee Network brand. Arriva North West, Vision Bus and Diamond Bus North West.

== See also ==
- List of stadiums in the United Kingdom by capacity
- Lists of stadiums
