= Horwich railway station =

Railway station in Lancashire, England, United Kingdom

Horwich

General information
- Location: Horwich, Bolton; England
- Coordinates: 53.5985°N 2.5453°W
- Grid reference: SD640115

Other information
- Status: Disused

History
- Original company: Lancashire and Yorkshire Railway
- Pre-grouping: Lancashire and Yorkshire Railway
- Post-grouping: London, Midland and Scottish Railway

Key dates
- 14 February 1870: Opened
- 27 September 1965: Closed to passengers
- 25 April 1966: Closed to goods
Location

Horwich railway station was located in Lancashire, England on a branch from the Manchester to Preston Line. It was closed to passengers on 27 September 1965 and to goods on 25 April 1966.

Opened on 14 February 1870 to serve the town of Horwich (now in Greater Manchester) but by 1884 the land to the east of the branch line, south of the town had been chosen for a major locomotive works.

Horwich railway station closed to passenger traffic on 27 September 1965, and goods the next year. Thirty-four years later Horwich Parkway railway station opened in 1999, adjacent to the Toughsheet Community Stadium. The nearest railway station to Horwich is now Blackrod. The line to Horwich Works remained open until their closure in 1983.

The station has been demolished and the site is a public park.

Former Services

Preceding station	Disused railways	Following station
Blackrod; Line closed, station open	Lancashire and Yorkshire Railway; Horwich Branch	Terminus

== See also ==
- Horwich Parkway railway station
