= Blackrod =

Town in Greater Manchester, England

Coordinates: 53.5898°N 2.5809°W

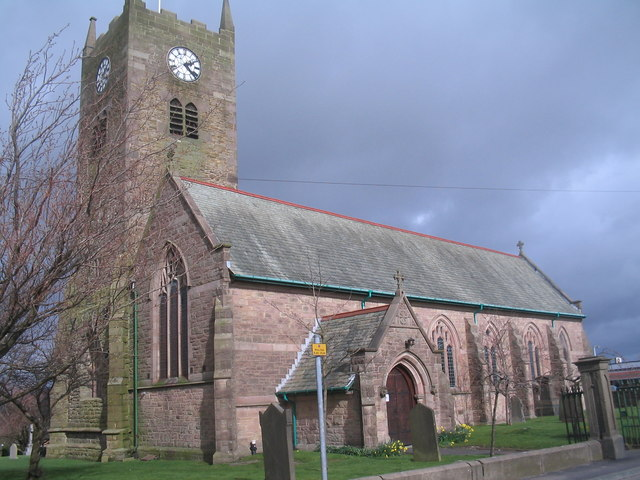
- Blackrod's parish church of St Katharine

- Location within Greater Manchester
- Population: 5,345 (2021 Census)
- OS grid reference: SD615105
  - London: 177 mi (285 km) SE
- Metropolitan borough: Bolton
- Metropolitan county: Greater Manchester
- Region: North West
- Country: England
- Sovereign state: United Kingdom
- Post town: BOLTON
- Postcode district: BL6
- Dialling code: 01942/01204
- Police: Greater Manchester
- Fire: Greater Manchester
- Ambulance: North West
- UK Parliament: Bolton West

Blackrod is a town and civil parish situated within the Metropolitan Borough of Bolton in Greater Manchester, England. Nestled in the historic county of Lancashire, Blackrod is approximately four miles (six kilometres) northeast of Wigan and 6 1/2 miles (10.5 kilometres) west of Bolton. According to the 2011 United Kingdom census, the town has a population of 5,345. Blackrod was once a centre for coal mining.

== History ==
The name Blackrod derives from the Old English, blaec and rodu, meaning a "dark clearing". The first mention of the town dates to 1189, when it was recorded as Blacherode. It was recorded as Blakerodein 1200, and Blacrode in 1220. Another suggestion is that "rod" may refer to Holy Rood, Cross of Christ.

Blackrod is reputed to be the site of a Roman station and they built a fort on the northern side of the town, on what is now a residential area called Castle Croft. The A6 road is built along the course of a Roman road that passes below the hill on which the town is built.

In the first half of the 12th century the manor of Blackrod was held by William Peverel, but was confiscated by the king and in 1190 it was granted to Hugh le Norreys. In 1212 Hugh de Blackrod was tenant. In 1223 Hugh Norreys became lord of Blackrod and the manor descended through his family. Mabel Norris heiress of Blackrod and Haigh married Roger de Bradshaw and the manor remained with the Bradshaws until the 16th century.

Arley Hall was an estate in the west of the township held by William le Walsh in 1393 and later by Standishes and Norrises. The hall was a moated manor house and is now the site of Wigan Golf Club.

After the Industrial Revolution the main industry of the town was coal mining and there was a brickworks. In 1869, the collieries operating in Blackrod included Anderton Hall, Dootson Vauze, Park Hall, Rigby Hill, Marklands and Blackrod. The Scot Lane Colliery employed 628 men underground and 122 surface workers in 1923; it closed in 1932. There were formerly bleachworks, a calico-printing works, and a weaving mill was built in 1906.

== Governance ==
Lying within the county boundaries of Lancashire since the early 12th century, Blackrod was a chapelry and township in the ecclesiastical parish of Bolton le Moors in the Hundred of Salford. It was part of the Wigan Poor Law Union which after 1837 took responsibility for the administration and funding of the Poor Law in that area. The Blackrod Local Board of Health was established in 1872 and in 1894 it became Blackrod Urban District. Blackrod was within the administrative county of Lancashire but after the passage of the Local Government Act 1972 the Urban District became part of Bolton Metropolitan Borough in Greater Manchester in 1974.

Blackrod constitutes a civil parish and is served by Blackrod Town Council.

== Geography ==
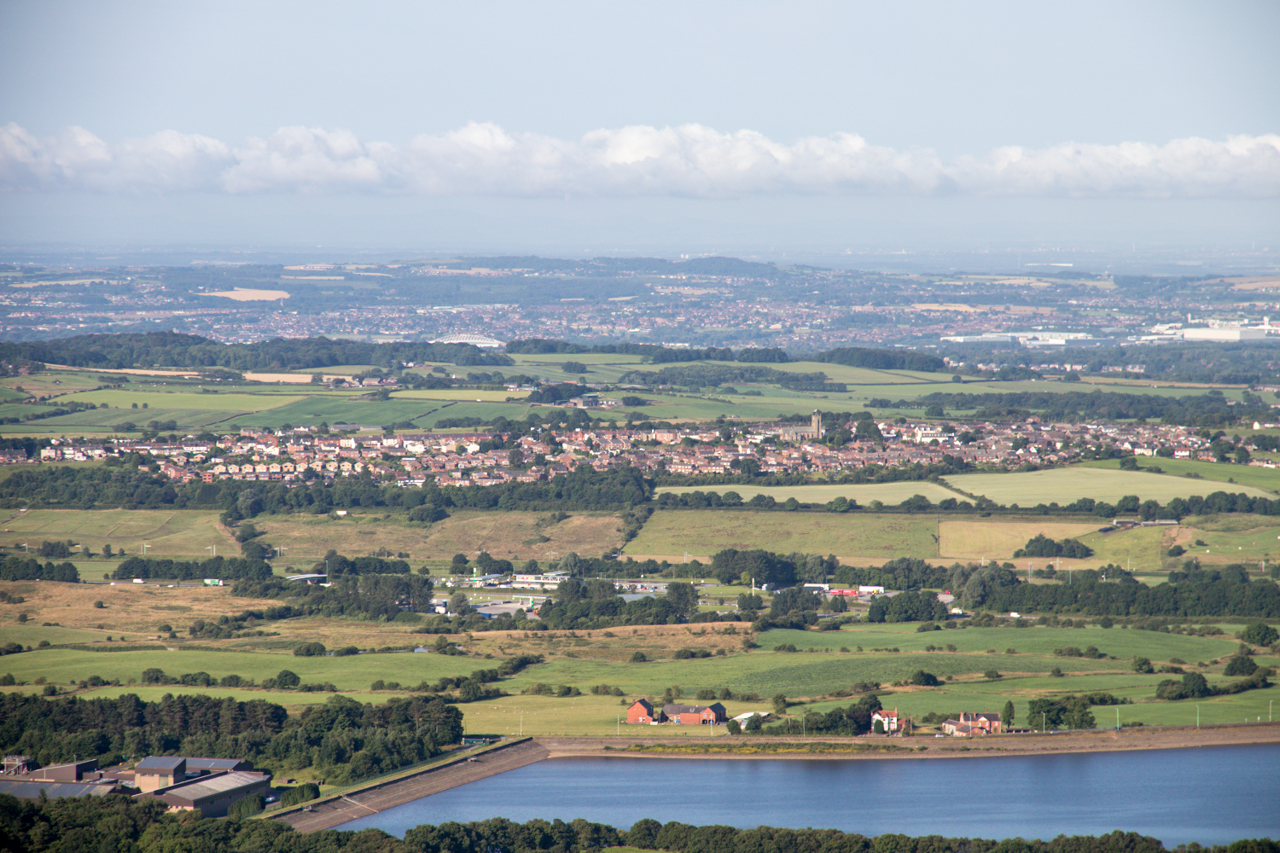
The village from Winterhill

Blackrod lies on hilly ground near the River Douglas, west of the West Pennine Moors, and covers 2,344 acres. It lies west of the M61 motorway, which divides it from Horwich. Besides Blackrod village, the parish includes the small settlements of Little Scotland and Scot Lane End.

Between Blackrod, Lostock and Horwich is Red Moss, a 116.6 acre (47.2 hectare) Site of Special Scientific Interest (SSSI) which was designated in 1995 for its biological interest. Red Moss is the best example of lowland raised mire in Greater Manchester and is one of 21 SSSIs in the area. The site is managed by the Wildlife Trust for Lancashire, Manchester and North Merseyside.

== Demography ==
=== Population change ===
Population changes in Blackrod since 1801

| Year | Population | ±% |
|---|---|---|
| 1801 | 1,623 | — |
| 1811 | 2,111 | +30.1% |
| 1821 | 2,436 | +15.4% |
| 1831 | 2,591 | +6.4% |
| 1841 | 2,615 | +0.9% |
| 1851 | 2,509 | −4.1% |
| 1861 | 2,911 | +16.0% |

| Year | Population | ±% |
|---|---|---|
| 1871 | 3,800 | +30.5% |
| 1881 | 4,234 | +11.4% |
| 1891 | 4,021 | −5.0% |
| 1901 | 3,875 | −3.6% |
| 1911 | 3,896 | +0.5% |
| 1921 | 3,867 | −0.7% |
| 1931 | 3,599 | −6.9% |

| Year | Population | ±% |
|---|---|---|
| 1939 | 3,072 | −14.6% |
| 1951 | 3,153 | +2.6% |
| 1961 | 3,606 | +14.4% |
| 2001 | 5,300 | +47.0% |
| 2011 | 5,001 | −5.6% |
| 2021 | 5,345 | +6.9% |

Sources: (a) Local population statistics. (b) A vision of Britain of through time. (c) Neighbourhood Statistics.

== Education ==
The earliest school in the township was Blackrod Grammar School, founded in 1586 by John Holmes. It had a building, now demolished, near the church and in 1875 was amalgamated with Rivington Grammar School. In 1973 the Rivington and Blackrod Grammar School became Rivington and Blackrod High School in Horwich providing secondary education for many pupils in Blackrod.

Blackrod has two primary schools: Blackrod Anglican Methodist Church School and Blackrod Primary School (formerly known as Blackrod County Primary School). A third school, Scot Lane End CofE Primary School, which was towards the southern end of the town, closed in 2008.

== Religion ==
The earliest mention of a chapel in Blackrod was in 1338 when Dame Mabel de Bradshagh endowed a chantry priest to say divine service and mass in the chapel of St Catherine. The present church, dedicated to St Katharine of Alexandria, is of Norman design though Elizabethan work can still be seen. The parish church was enlarged in 1776, galleries added in 1837, the roof renewed in 1894, the chancel rebuilt in 1905 and nave in 1911. During this time the spelling was changed to Catherine, and then again to the current Katharine. There are six bells in the west tower, cast in 1776, renewed in 1922, and the clock was illuminated in 1947.

A full refurbishment of the belfry installation was completed in 2015.

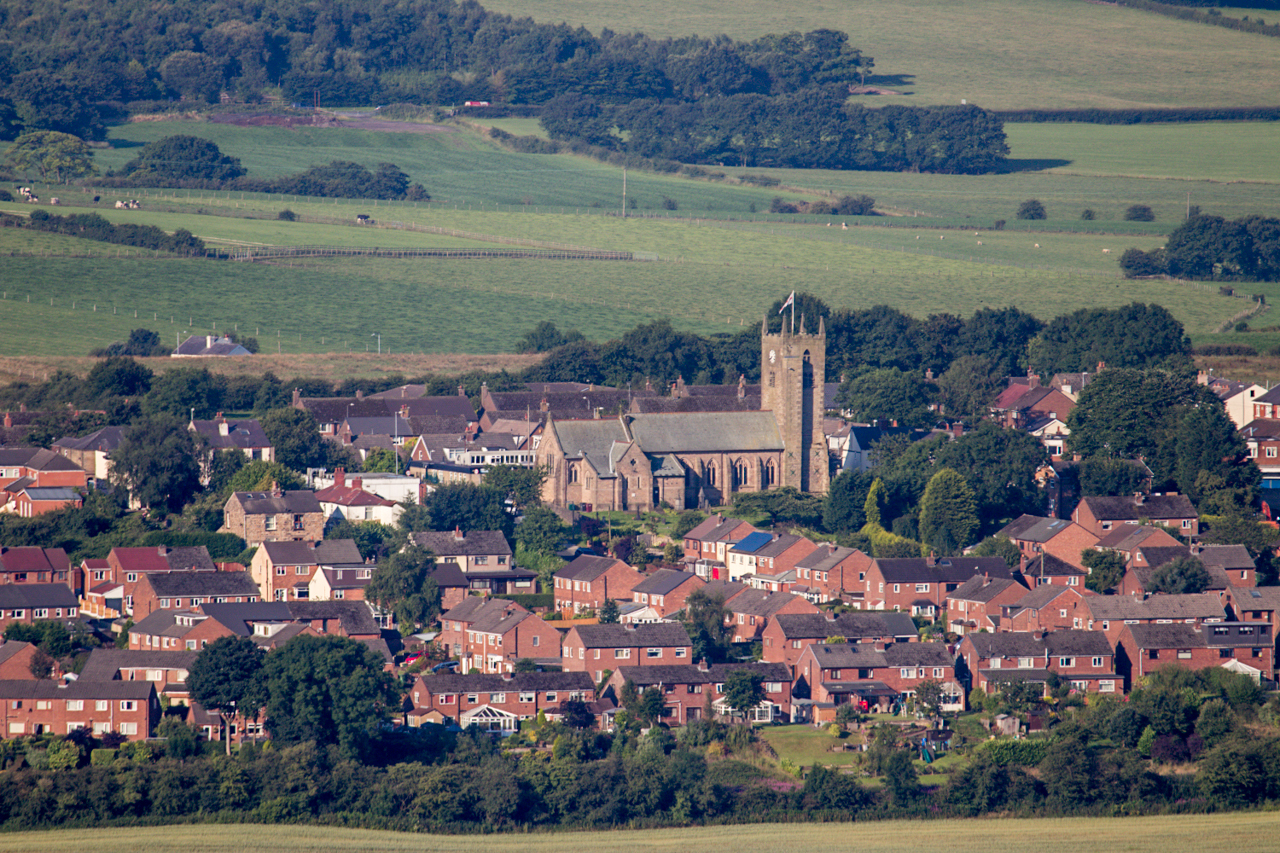
St Katharines Church from Winterhill

== Transport ==
Blackrod is served by Blackrod railway station on the Manchester to Preston Line which opened in 1841 and where there was a branch line to Horwich. Mineral lines served the various collieries.

The main road through the township was the A6, Manchester to Preston road which now bypasses the town centre. The B5408 goes through the town. There are roads to Horwich and Aspull. The M61 motorway, part of the national motorway network between the M60/M62 (Manchester orbital motorway) and the M6 (Preston) was opened on 28 November 1969 by Fred Mulley, Minister of Transport.

== Media ==
Local news and television programmes are provided by BBC North West and ITV Granada. Television signals are received from the nearby Winter Hill TV transmitter situated north east of the town.

Local radio stations are BBC Radio Manchester, Heart North West, Smooth North West, Greatest Hits Radio Bolton & Bury, Capital Manchester and Lancashire and Bolton FM, a community-based radio station which broadcast from its studios in Bolton.

Horwich Advertiser is the local newspaper including other regional newspapers, The Bolton News, and Manchester Evening News.

== Notable people ==
- Laurence Vaux (1519–1585), an English canon regular.
- John Mitchinson (1932–2021), an English operatic tenor, worked with Sadler's Wells and the Welsh National Opera
- Ivor Bolton (born 1958), an English conductor and harpsichordist.
- Kate Long (born 1964), an English author, raised locally, wrote The Bad Mother's Handbook.

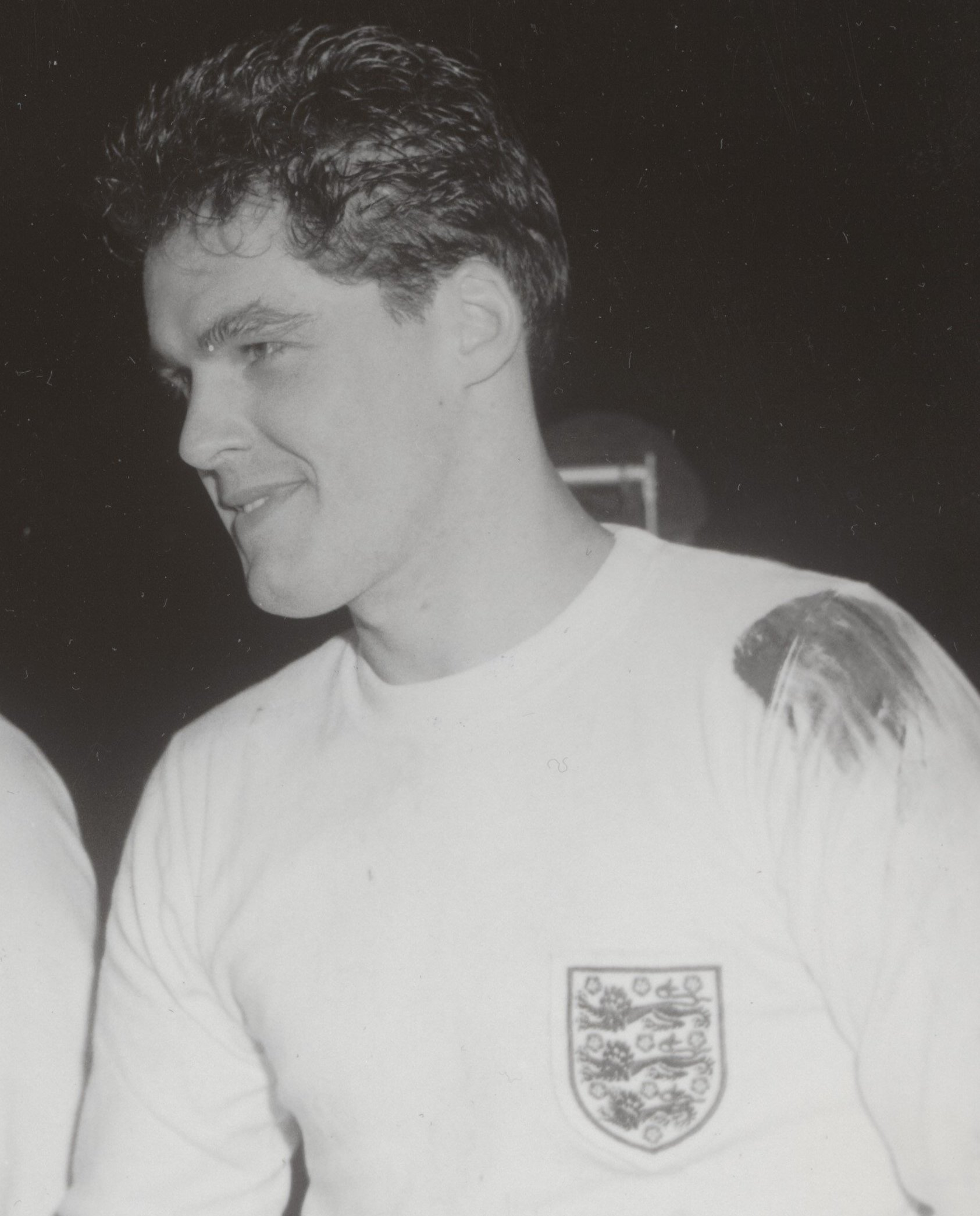
Frank Wignall, 1964

=== Sport ===
- Ted McDonald (1891–1937), cricketer who played 281 First-class cricket matches, died locally
- Arthur Cunliffe (1909–1986), footballer who played about 300 games, starting with 129 for Blackburn Rovers
- Jimmy Cunliffe (1912–1986), footballer who played 174 games for Everton
- Frank Wignall (born 1939), an English former footballer who played 323 games
- Pete Anglesea (born 1971), rugby union rugby player, who played 133 games for the Sale Sharks.
- Phil Clarke (born 1971), former rugby league footballer who played 154 games for Wigan Warriors

== See also ==
- Listed buildings in Blackrod
