= Red Moss, Greater Manchester =

Wetland bog in Greater Manchester, England

Coordinates: 53.58890°N 2.55287°W

Red Moss
- Site of Special Scientific Interest
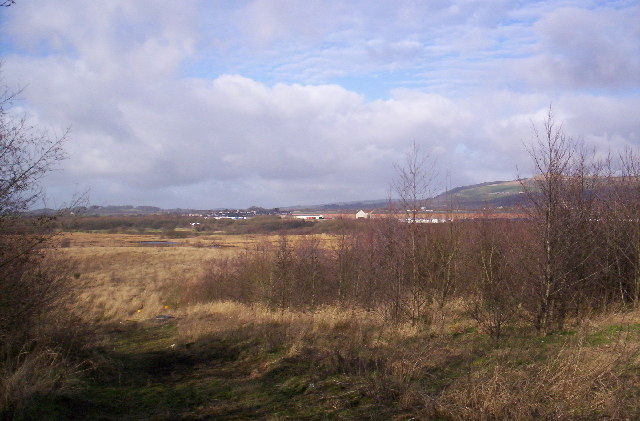
- Location of Red Moss.
- Area of search: Greater Manchester
- Grid reference: SD635104
- Interest: Biological
- Area: 47.2 hectares (117 acres)

Red Moss is a mossland in Greater Manchester, located south of Horwich and east of Blackrod. This is a national Site of Special Scientific Interest in the United Kingdom, due to its biodiversity and undisturbed character. Pollen analysis has revealed the first peat deposits of the northwest's mosslands to be from around 8,000 years BC making Red Moss an impressive 10,000 years old. Red Moss covers an area of 47.2 hectares. A severed female head was discovered in Red Moss in the 19th century dating from the Bronze Age or early Iron Age.

Bolton Metropolitan Borough Council owns most of the moss, but parts of the site are also owned by British Rail and United Utilities.

== History ==
In 1999, the Wildlife Trust for Lancashire, Manchester and North Merseyside was asked to manage the area of land owned by Bolton Council with the aim of restoring suitable water levels and conditions for the growth of mossland species. Since 1999, the Trust has been undertaking large-scale capital works to block drainage ditches and raise water levels within the mossland to a level suitable for the growth of mossland species. Baulkways, strips of higher land, have been created to isolate the mossland so that the site is now fed purely from rainfall and helps protect the site from pollution. Water levels have risen considerably and mossland vegetation is now beginning to flourish over a wider area of the site. It is also hoped that in the future many of the species that have been lost can be re-established. In May 2010, the area was badly damaged by a fire.

== Fauna and flora ==
=== Fauna ===
Snipe and teal breed on the open mossland and the locally scarce black darter is present.

=== Flora ===
The site is notable for its diversity of sphagnum moss species, with nine species identified as present on the site. Other plants present include common cottongrass and hare's tail cottongrass and purple moor grass, which dominates most of the site.
