= Rawlinson Bridge railway station =

Former railway station in England

Coordinates: 53.6221°N 2.6096°W

Rawlinson Bridge was the first railway station in the Borough of Chorley in Lancashire, England. The station was located in the village of Heath Charnock and was situated on the Bolton and Preston Railway. The station opened on 4 February 1841.

By an act of Parliament, the Bolton and Preston Railway Act 1837 (7 Will. 4 & 1 Vict. c. cxxi), the Bolton and Preston Railway Company had constructed a link with the Manchester line comprising nine and a half miles of railway to a station which was to be a temporary terminus as the railway continued to be built towards Chorley. Four years later on 22 December 1841 the line had reached Chorley and Rawlinson Bridge station was superseded by more centralised stations at Chorley and Adlington.

No traces of the former terminus remain although after closure the site became home of the junction linking the mineral railway which served Ellerbeck Colliery to the main line. This line and the colliery closed in the 1960s.
