= Adlington railway station (Lancashire) =

Railway station in Lancashire, England

Coordinates: 53.613°N 2.603°W

Adlington (Lancashire)
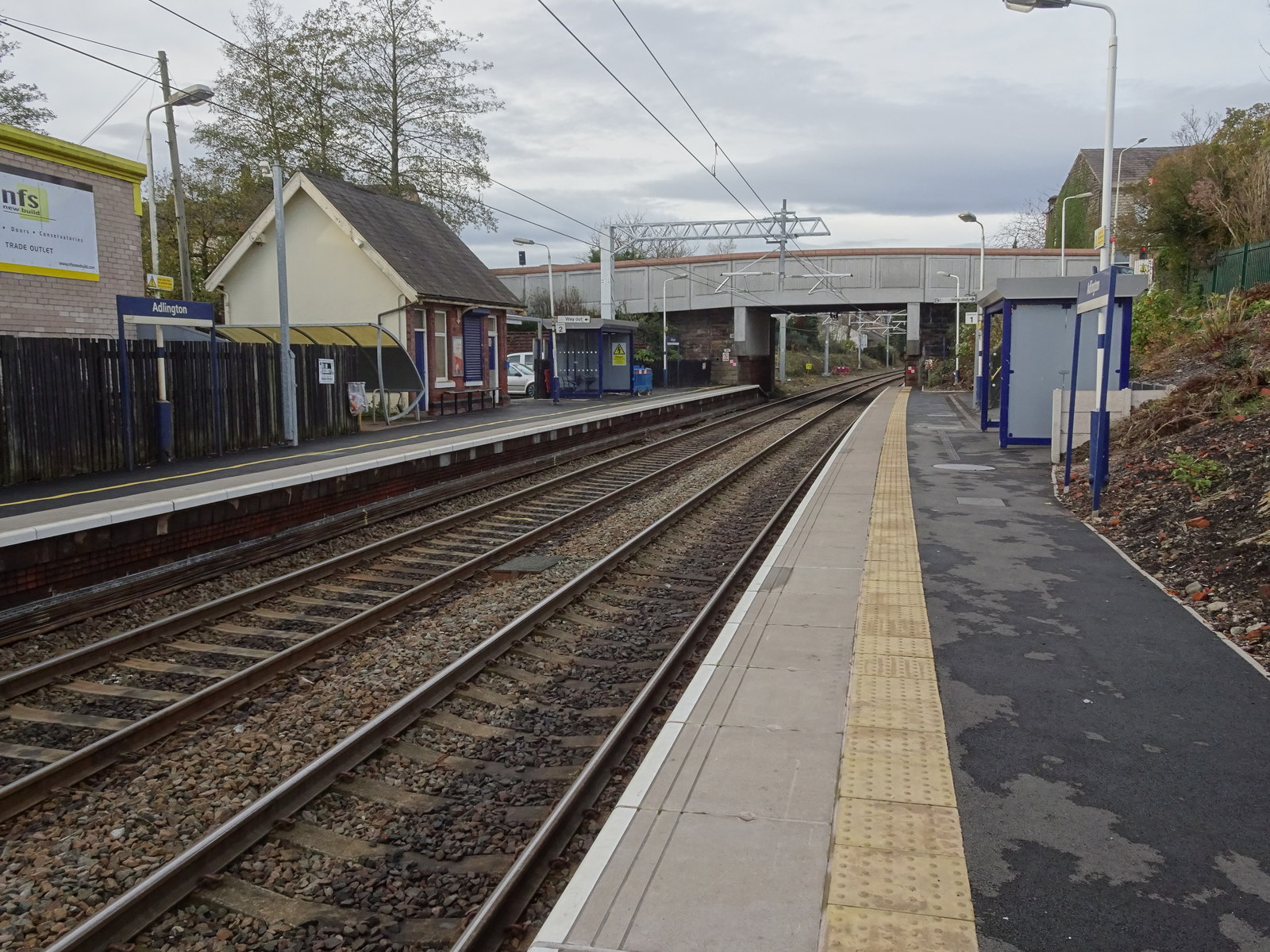
- Adlington railway station in 2018

General information
- Location: Adlington, Chorley; England
- Grid reference: SD602131
- Managed by: Northern Trains
- Platforms: 2

Other information
- Station code: ADL
- Classification: DfT category F2

History
- Opened: 4 February 1841

Passengers
- 2020/21: ▼29,544
- 2021/22: ▲80,814
- 2022/23: ▲0.105 million
- 2023/24: ▲0.143 million
- 2024/25: ▲0.167 million
Location
Notes
- Passenger statistics from the Office of Rail and Road

Adlington railway station serves the town of Adlington in Lancashire, England. It is a two-platform station on the Bolton - Chorley - Preston line, forming part of the Northern service link between Preston and Manchester via Bolton and Chorley.

Until 1960, Adlington was also served by a station named White Bear (on the Lancashire Union Railway).

== History ==
On 15 June 1837, by an act of Parliament, the Bolton and Preston Railway Company constructed a link with the Manchester line, comprising nine and a half miles of railway to a temporary terminus at Rawlinson Lane. By December 1841, the line had reached Chorley and Adlington station opened to take over from Rawlinson Bridge.

The line would pass into the hands of the London, Midland and Scottish Railway during the Grouping of 1923. The line then passed on to the London Midland Region of British Railways on nationalisation in 1948.

When Sectorisation was introduced, the station was served by Regional Railways until the Privatisation of British Rail.

== Facilities ==
The station has a staffed ticket office, open from the start of service until 13:10 Mondays to Saturdays. A ticket vending machine is in place for the purchase of tickets or promise-to-pay coupons when the ticket office is closed and for the collection of pre-paid tickets. A waiting room is available in the main building when the booking office is open, and there are shelters on each platform. Train running information is provided by timetable posters and telephone, as well as newly installed electronic displays in the waiting shelters on both platforms. There is step-free access to both platforms; however, there is no tactile paving on the northbound platform. Platform 2, for services towards Manchester, can only be accessed by a steep ramp, which is not suitable for wheelchairs. The nearest station with full tactile paving and full step-free access is Blackrod. Mobility scooters cannot be taken on board trains from Adlington; however, they can be taken on board when traveling to/from the next station at Blackrod.

== Passenger volume ==
Passenger Volume at Adlington (Lancashire)
	2019-20	2020-21	2021-22	2022-23
Entries and exits	134,180	29,544	80,814	105,040

== Services ==
During off-peak hours, one train per hour calls at this station throughout the day, seven days a week, on the route between Blackpool North and Manchester Airport, operated by Northern Trains. During Monday to Saturday peak times, Adlington and Blackrod are both served by two trains per hour in each direction.

Saturday and Sunday services were replaced by buses most weekends from May 2015 until November 2018 due to late-running electrification work on the route. Weekend services resumed on Sunday 11 November 2018 after the completion of the electrification engineering work.

Until December 2021, Adlington was served by a two-hourly train service between Preston and Manchester Victoria, but this was withdrawn due to a shortage of train crew, to improve reliability on the route, and engineering works, and replaced by a shuttle bus service between Chorley and Blackrod, receiving only a peak-only train service. Since May 2022, it has received an hourly service between Blackpool North and Manchester Airport, which increases to half-hourly during peak times.

Since 2019, all train services have been provided by electric multiple units.

The majority of services on the Manchester - Blackpool route are operated by six-carriage (3+3) Class 331 units, and until mid-2023, only the front four coaches could fit on the platforms. The platforms were extended, and now all carriages fit on the platform, however as of September 2024 announcements and information screens on southbound trains still say that the doors in the sixth coach will not open.

Preceding station	National Rail	Following station
Chorley	Northern Trains Blackpool North to Manchester Airport	Blackrod

== Renovation and electrification ==
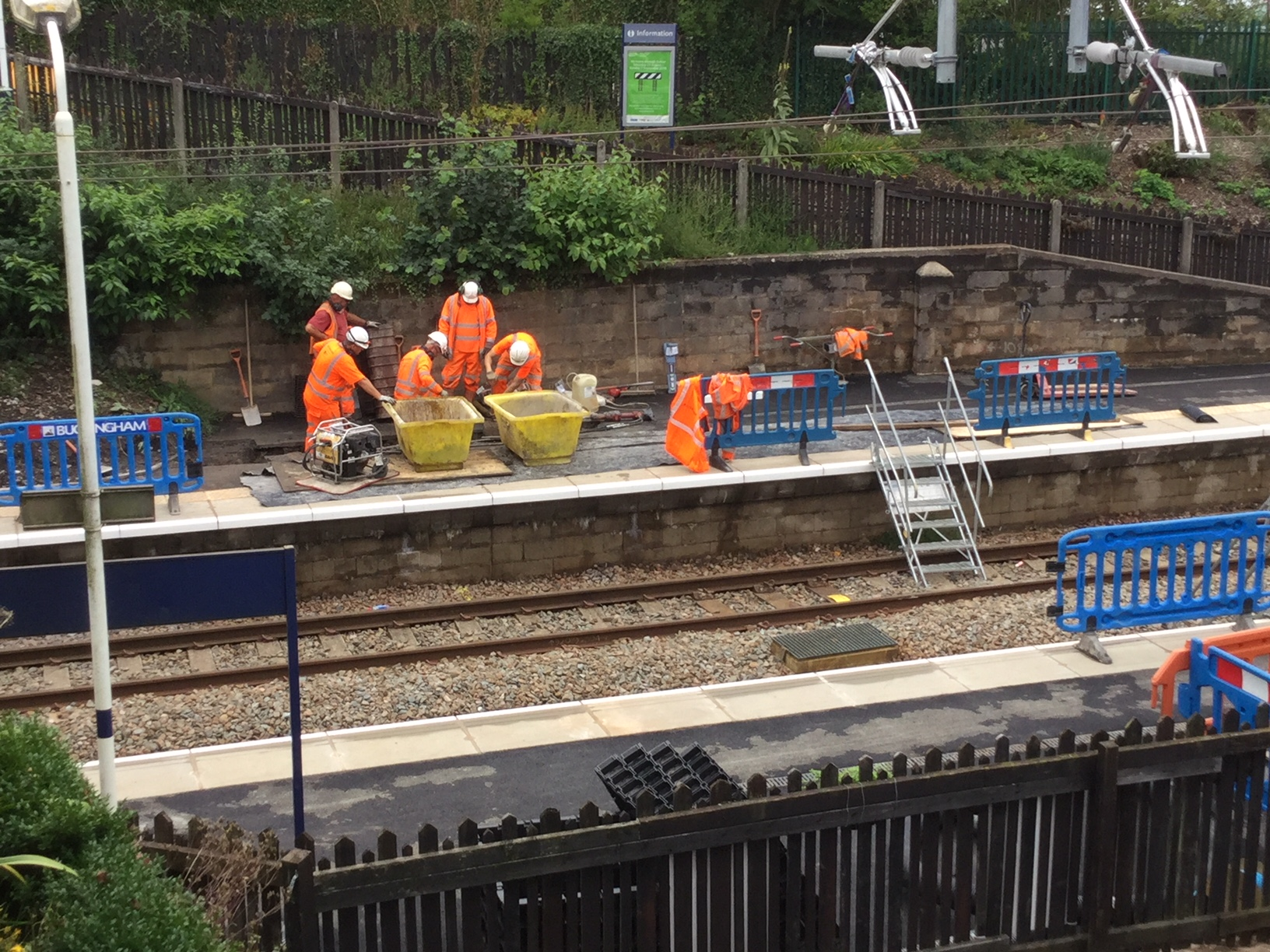
Work in August 2018 at Adlington Railway Station, including electrification

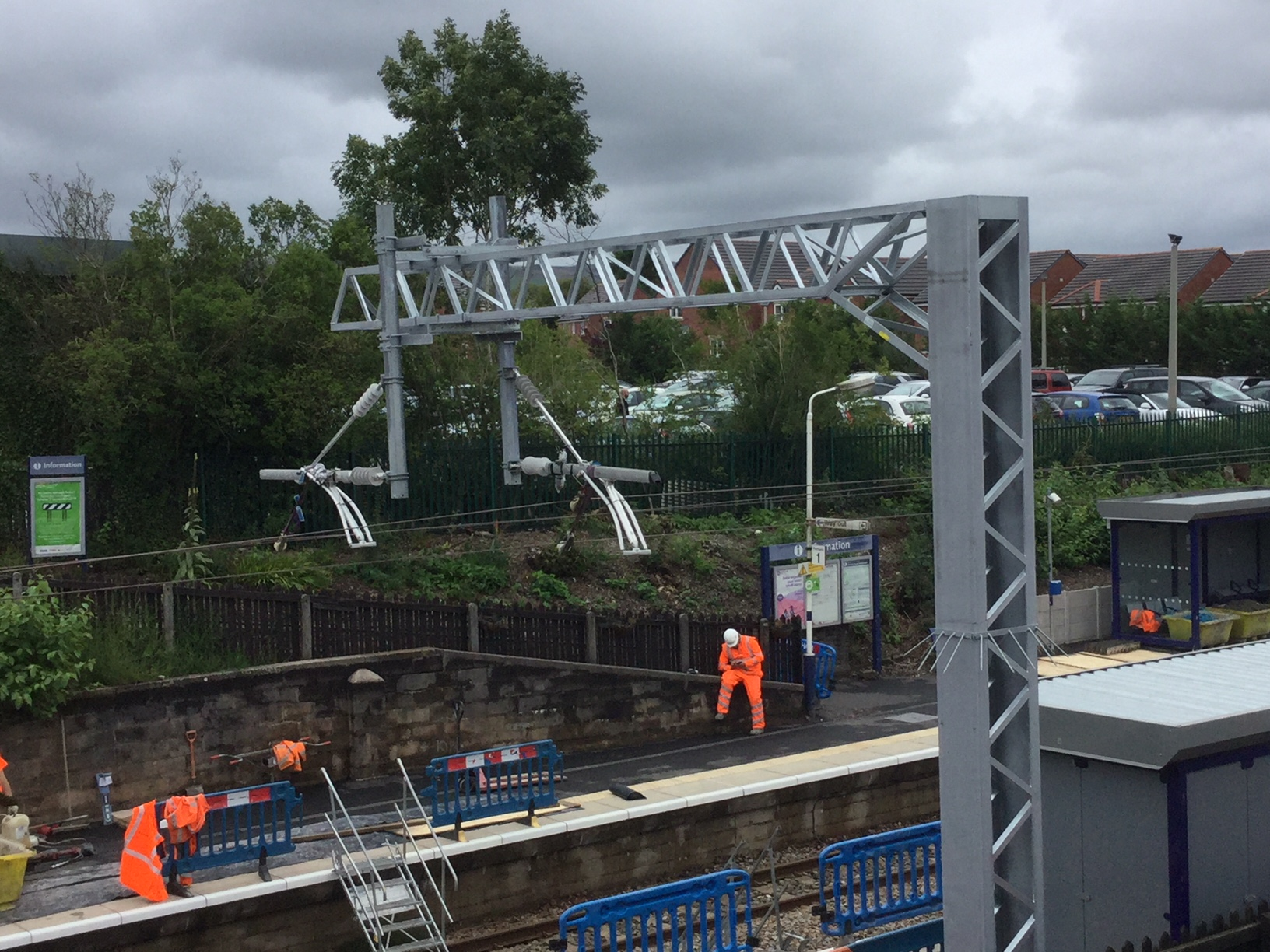
Work in August 2018 at Adlington Railway Station, including electrification

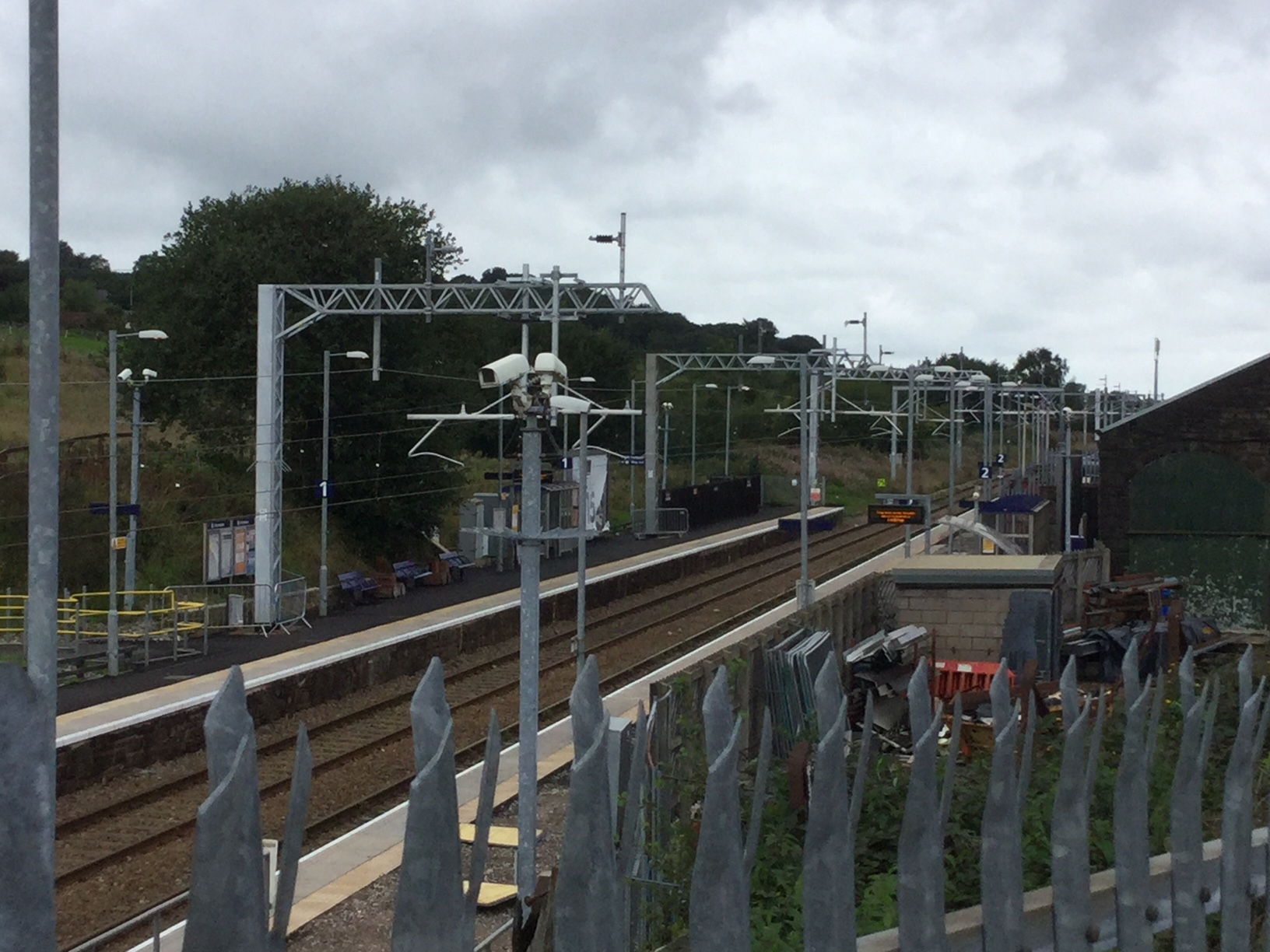
Work in August 2018 at Adlington Railway Station, including electrification - general view

It was announced by the Department for Transport in December 2009 that the line between Preston and Manchester, on which the station is situated, would be electrified, enabling a reduction in journey times to Manchester by up to ten minutes. There have been many delays, but completion was in December 2018 when test trains (Virgin Pendolino) finally ran between Preston and Manchester.

Electric service commenced on 11 February 2019, using Class 319 electric multiple units.
