= Blackrod railway station =

Railway station in Greater Manchester, England

Blackrod
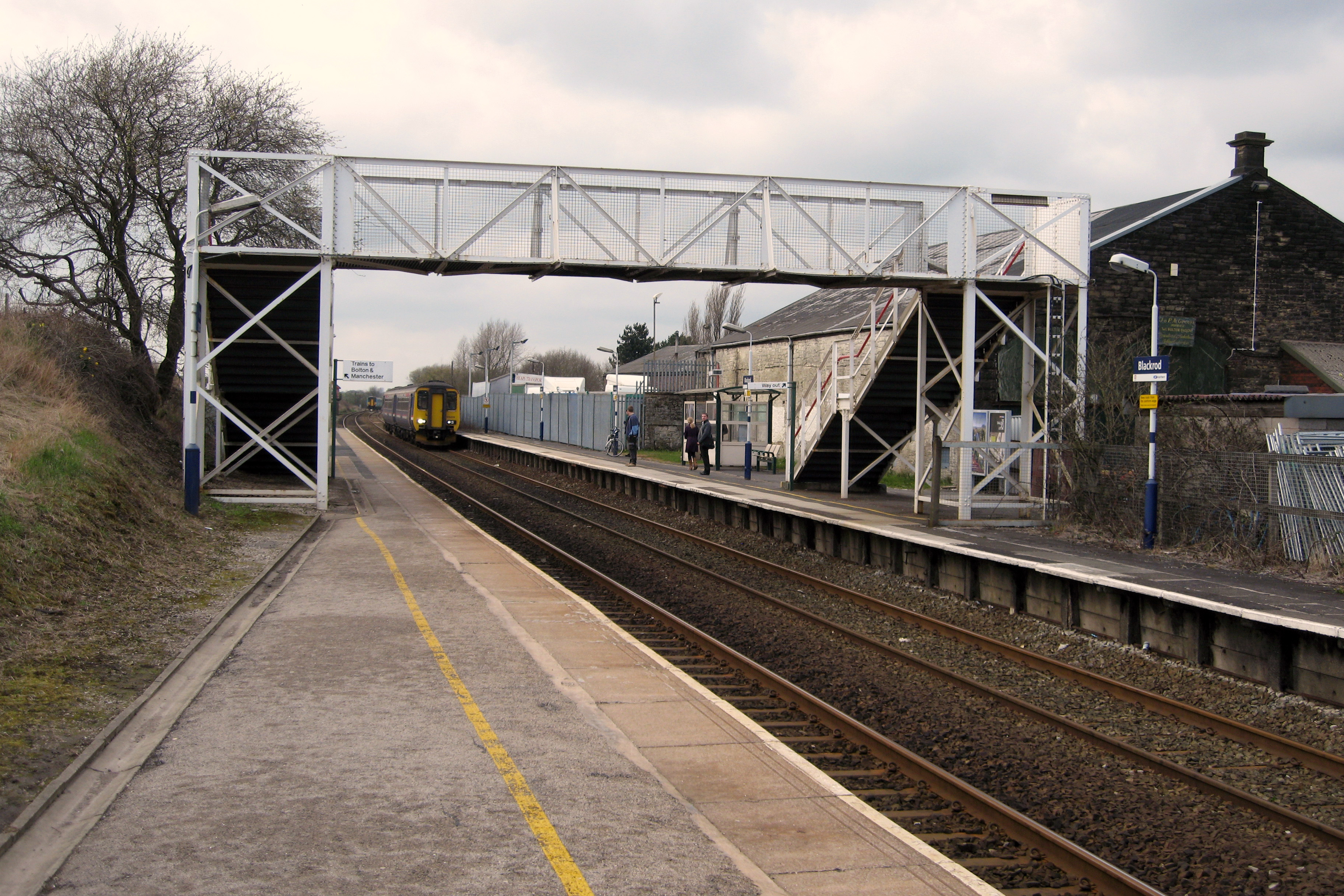
- Blackrod railway station, seen prior to the completion of refurbishment and electrification works

General information
- Location: Blackrod, Bolton; England
- Coordinates: 53.591°N 2.570°W
- Grid reference: SD623106
- Managed by: Northern Trains
- Platforms: 2

Other information
- Station code: BLK
- Classification: DfT category F1

Passengers
- 2020/21: ▼51,754
- 2021/22: ▲0.132 million
- 2022/23: ▲0.154 million
- 2023/24: ▲0.196 million
- 2024/25: ▲0.226 million
Location
Notes
- Passenger statistics from the Office of Rail and Road

Blackrod railway station serves the towns of Blackrod and Horwich, Greater Manchester, England. It is 6.5 miles (10 km ) north west of Bolton railway station. It is just 1 1/4 miles (2.0 km) from the town centre of Horwich - closer than Horwich Parkway station.

It lies on the Manchester-Preston Line and is served by Northern Trains, who run express trains from Manchester Airport to Blackpool North. Despite its high passenger usage and the recent refurbishment (see below) the station is currently unstaffed. A drop in passenger usage in the year 2017/18 is largely due to industrial action and engineering works with the drop in the year 2020/21 due to the COVID-19 pandemic and reduced timetable.

== History ==
The station was opened on 4 February 1841 as Horwich Road by the Manchester and Bolton Railway. It was renamed Horwich and Blackrod, then Horwich Junction, then Horwich and Blackrod junction, and finally Blackrod in 1888

Blackrod was once the junction for a short branch to serve the original Horwich station (closed to passengers on 27 September 1965) and Horwich Locomotive Works (sold in 1988, after which the line was closed and lifted). Until the 1980s, Blackrod had a poor frequency of service, but for many years it has been a popular commuter station.

== Technical railway information ==
The station had until recently a signal box, the only one on the entire Manchester to Preston route. This had outlasted the others as it acted as the 'fringe' to both the Manchester Piccadilly signalling centre and Preston PSB. The train description system used in the Preston installation was incompatible with that installed at Piccadilly so the signaller at Blackrod had to transfer train data manually from one system to the other as each one passed through his/her control area. A similar situation existed at Bromley Cross on the Bolton to Blackburn line, where the two control areas also overlap.
Network Rail announced in May 2012 that the box was due to be abolished in January 2013, with control passing to the Piccadilly signalling centre. This is part of a programme of signalling renewals associated with the planned electrification of the Manchester-Preston line (due for completion in 2016). The box was duly decommissioned on 10 February 2013 and subsequently demolished.

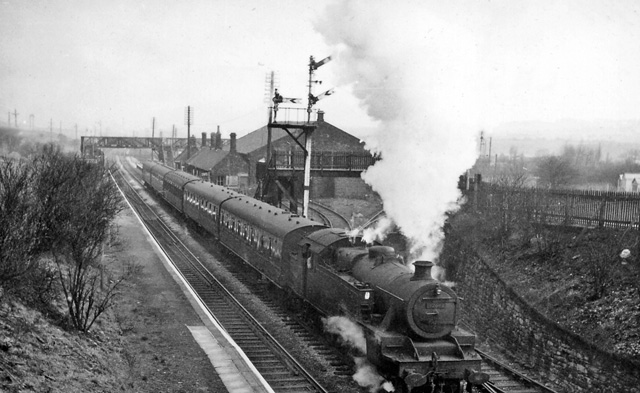
Blackrod in 1962

== 2012 refurbishment ==
Over one million pounds worth of improvements to the station (including the removal of the footbridge shown in the photo and its replacement with step-free access ramps) were completed in November 2012.

== Facilities ==
A ticket vending machine is in place for purchase of tickets or promise to pay coupons and for the collection of pre-paid tickets. Digital station information boards are in operation on both platforms along public announcements. Car parking is available. Both platforms have step-free access via ramps from Station Road. The signal box is not in use any more. Since May 2020, certain mobility scooters can be carried on all services from Blackrod.

== Services ==
As of December 2022, 1 train per hour calls at this station off-peak 7 days a week between Manchester Airport and Blackpool North. Services run half-hourly Monday-Saturday between 06:00 - 09:00 and 16:30 - 19:30 in both directions and also northbound between 19:30 and 21:00.

Saturday and Sunday services were replaced by buses most weekends from May 2015 until November 2018 due to the late-running electrification work on the route. Weekend services resumed on Sunday 11 November 2018 after the completion of the electrification engineering work. Sunday services were regularly replaced by buses between December 2018 and March 2021 due to train crew shortages, but a full Sunday service is now in operation.

For several years, the station was served hourly by the Manchester Victoria to Preston service. In December 2021, this service was withdrawn due to train crew availability and to improve reliability on the line, and both Blackrod and Adlington were only served at peak times. In May 2022 the timetables were adjusted so the hourly Blackpool North to Manchester Airport service would stop at both of these stations throughout the day, and the station receives hourly off-peak services as of 2025.

Since the December 2022 timetable change, most services are operated by 6-carriage Class 331 units which were previously too long to allow all doors to open on platform 1 (for services from Manchester towards Blackpool); as a result, only the doors in the front 5 carriages would open when the train stops on platform 1. Platform 2 (for services from Blackpool towards Manchester) is longer and all train doors can be used. Platform 1 has been extended in 2023 and as a result all doors can now open on both platforms.

== Renovation and electrification ==
It was announced by the Department for Transport in December 2009, the line between Preston and Manchester, on which the station is situated, will be electrified which should reduce journey times to Manchester by up to ten minutes. There have been many delays but completion is expected before December 2018.

Electric service commenced on 11 February 2019, initially utilising Class 319 electric multiple units.

== Post electrification services ==
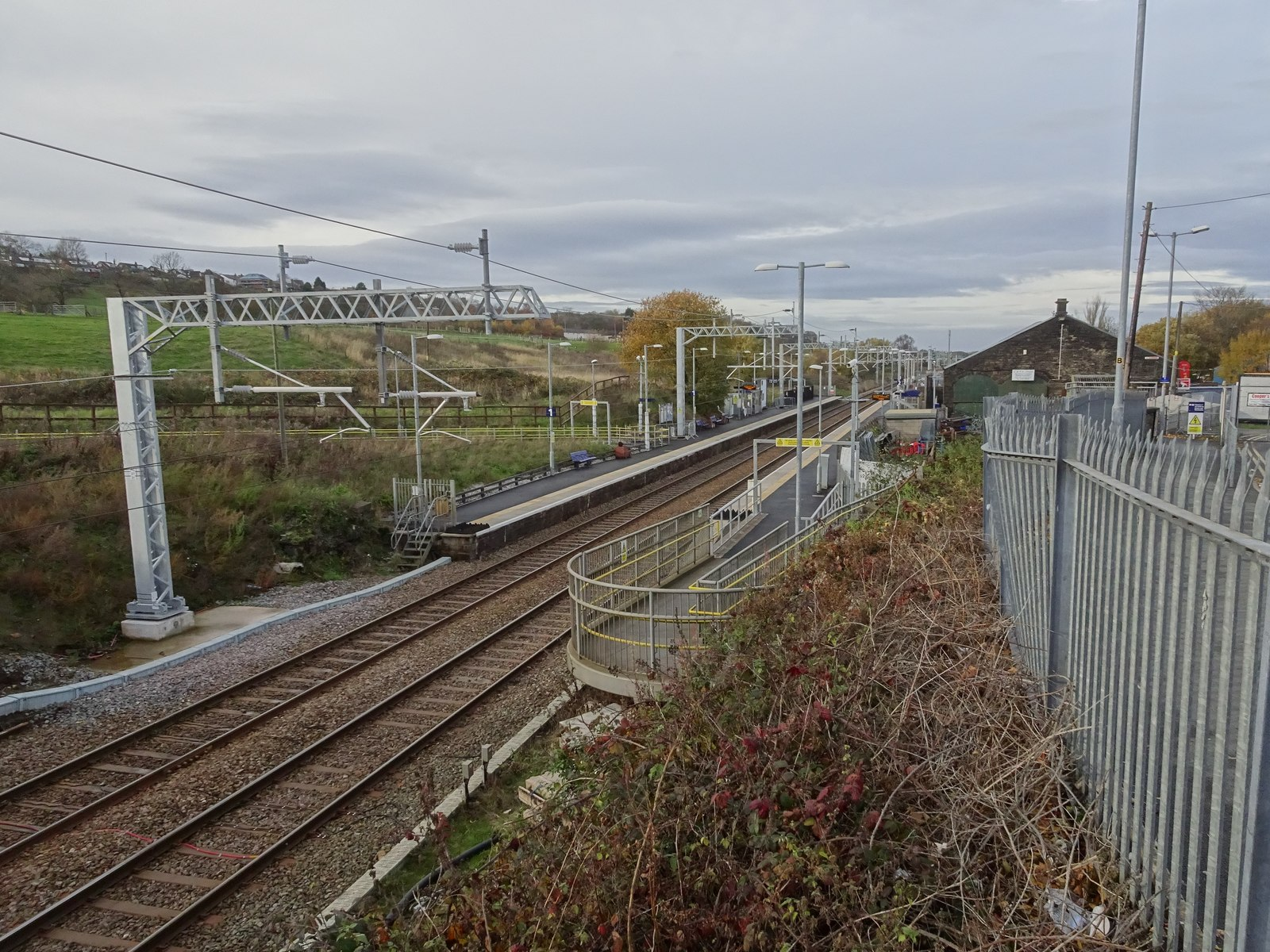
The station in 2018, following refurbishment and completion of electrification works.

A new timetable was introduced in May 2019 featuring new electric trains and shorter journey times; daytime services run hourly between Preston and Manchester Victoria with evening and additional peak services running between Blackpool North and Manchester Piccadilly and onwards to Manchester Airport or Hazel Grove. Initially all services utilised Class 319 electric multiple units. Since December 2019, most services have utilised Class 331 electric multiple units, with all services being operated by 331s by 2022.

Preceding station	National Rail	Following station
Adlington (Lancs)	Northern Trains Blackpool North - Manchester Airport	Horwich Parkway
	Historical railways	
Adlington; Line and station open	Lancashire and Yorkshire Railway; Bolton and Preston Railway	Lostock Lane; Line open, station closed
	Disused railways	
Terminus	Lancashire and Yorkshire Railway; Horwich Branch	Horwich; Line and station closed
