= Horwich Parkway railway station =

Railway station in Greater Manchester, England

Coordinates: 53.578°N 2.540°W

Horwich Parkway
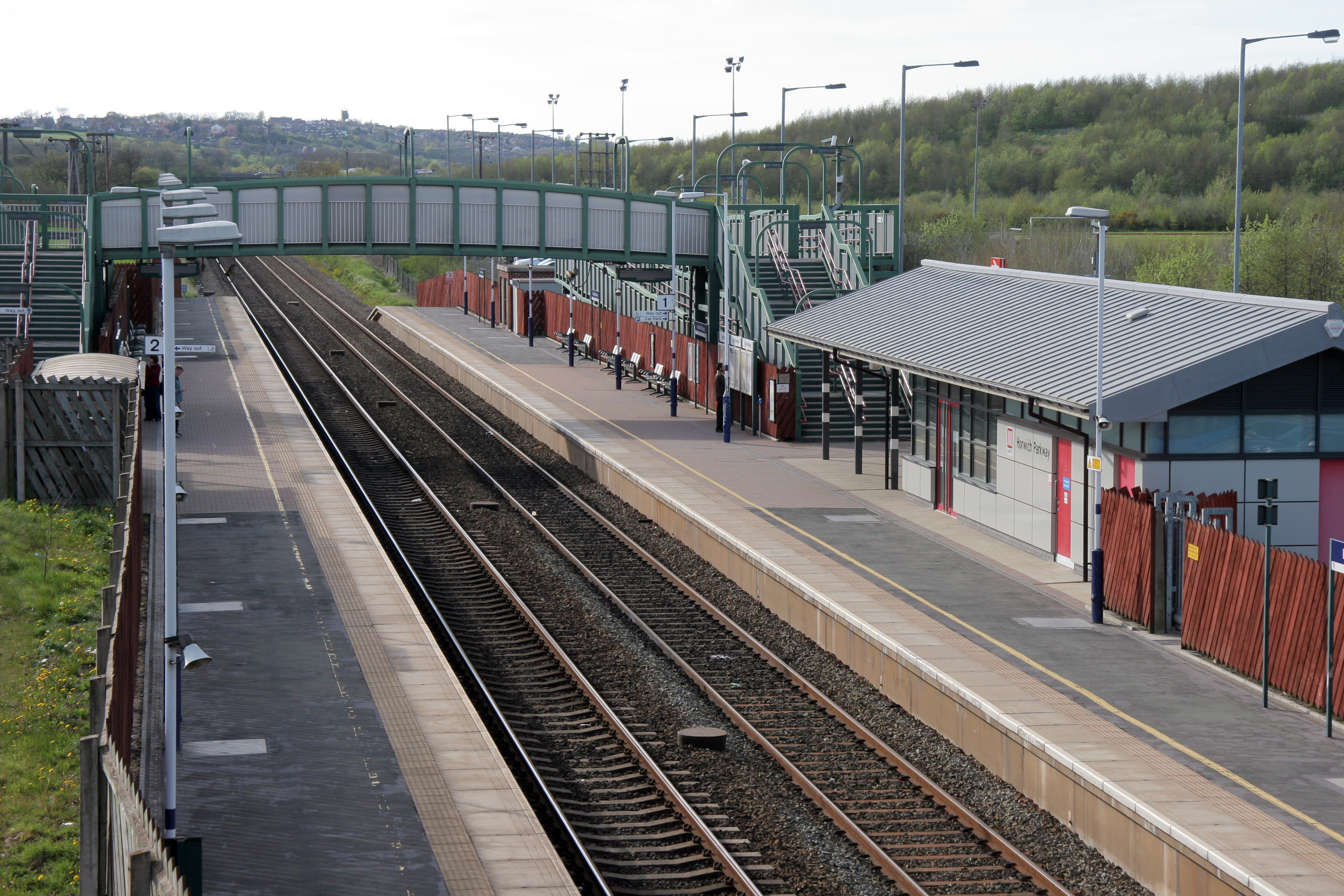
- Horwich Parkway seen prior to electrification

General information
- Location: Horwich, Bolton; England
- Grid reference: SD643091
- Managed by: Transport for Greater Manchester
- Platforms: 2

Other information
- Station code: HWI
- Classification: DfT category F1

History
- Original company: Railtrack

Key dates
- 2 July 1999: Station opened

Passengers
- 2020/21: ▼0.104 million
- 2021/22: ▲0.390 million
- 2022/23: ▲0.447 million
- 2023/24: ▲0.507 million
- 2024/25: ▲0.550 million
Location
Notes
- Passenger statistics from the Office of Rail and Road

Horwich Parkway is a railway station serving the town of Horwich and suburb of Middlebrook in Greater Manchester, England. The station is 16 1/4 miles (26.2 km) north west of Manchester Piccadilly on the Manchester to Preston line. The station is close to Junction 6 of the M61 motorway. It has digital information displays.

Horwich Parkway opened on 2 July 1999. A ticket office was built in 2007 and car parking provision has been expanded on several occasions. A wind turbine was built in 2012 and the station is powered by green energy. Horwich Parkway is the railway station for the Toughsheet Community Stadium, home of Bolton Wanderers F.C.

Rail services are operated by Northern Trains. On 1 February 2021, management of the station was transferred from Northern Trains to Transport for Greater Manchester (TfGM). It is the only railway station owned and managed by TfGM.

The town centre of Horwich is much closer (1¼ miles) to Blackrod, the next station on the line. Frequent direct bus services operate from Blackrod to Horwich town centre.

== Facilities ==
The station has a ticket office on Platform 1, which is open Monday-Saturday 06:20-19:35. A ticket vending machine is in place for purchase of tickets or promise to pay coupons when the ticket office is closed and for the collection of pre-paid tickets. Digital station information boards are in operation on both platforms. Car parking is available adjacent to the ticket office.

== Services ==
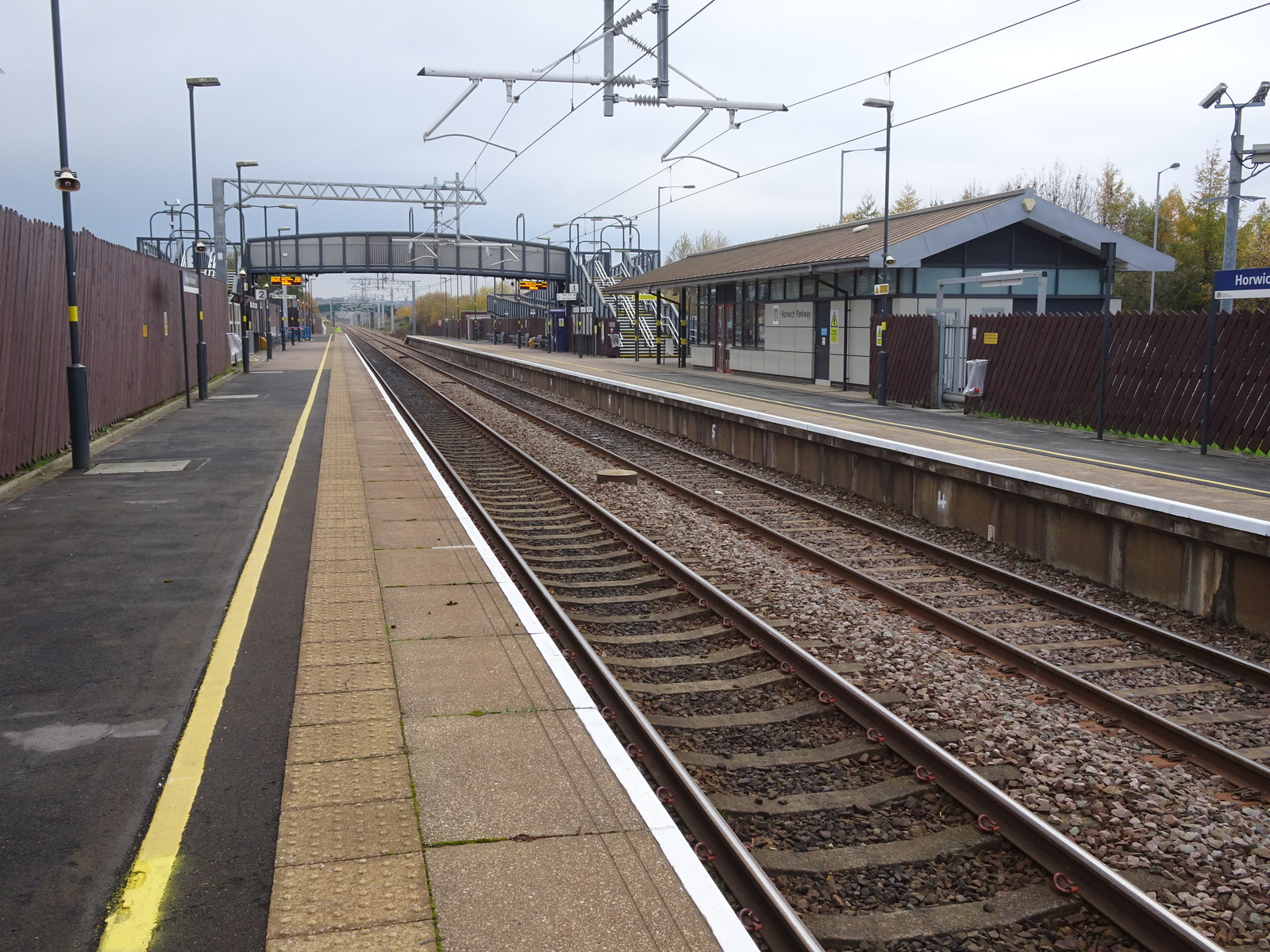
The station in 2018, following completion of electrification works.

There are two trains per hour Monday to Saturday, northbound to Blackpool North and southbound to Manchester Airport via Manchester Piccadilly. This is reduced to one train per hour on Sundays.

Extra services operate from Horwich Parkway on Mondays to Saturdays in the rush hour, with two per day southbound to Manchester Airport in the morning and one in the evening northbound to Windermere.

The delayed electrification work on the Manchester to Preston line (running two years behind schedule) led to a temporary reduction in service frequency here from the start of the summer 2018 timetable, along with regular weekend engineering blockades and replacement buses in place of the scheduled train service. Weekend services resumed on Sunday 11 November 2018 after the completion of the engineering work after more than three years of regular weekend possessions.

Electric service commenced on 11 February 2019 utilising Class 319 electric multiple units.

In years past, there were regular services to Manchester Victoria and also to Hazel Grove. Both ceased at the December 2022 timetable change, though the former had only run on Sundays since December 2021.

== See also ==
- Horwich railway station (town centre station, closed in 1966)

| Preceding station | National Rail | Following station |
|---|---|---|
| Blackrod | Northern Manchester–Preston line | Lostock |
| Chorley | Northern Manchester–Preston line | Lostock |
