= Red Rock railway station =

Former railway station in England

Red Rock
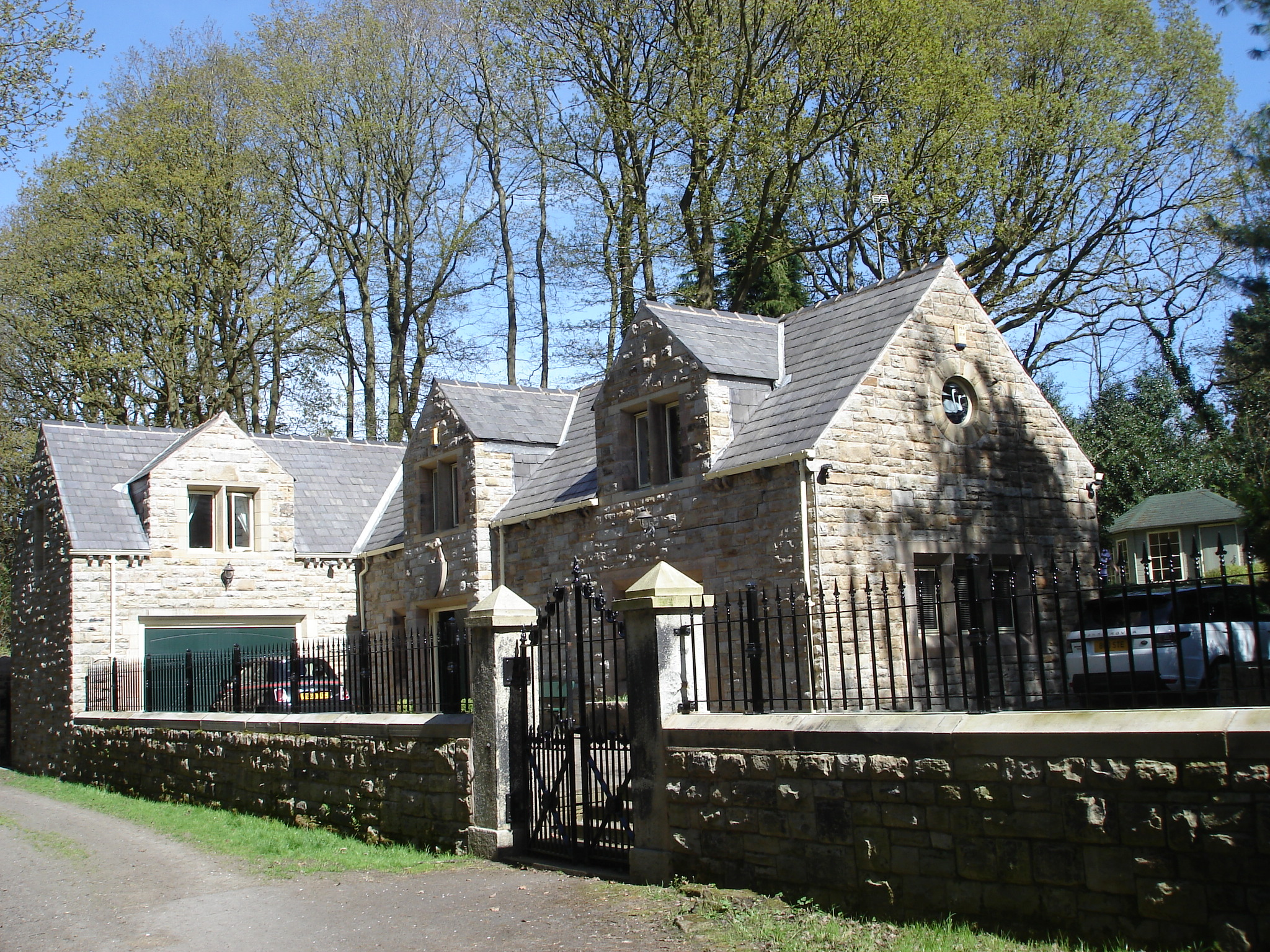
- Former Red Rock railway station

General information
- Location: Red Rock, Standish, Wigan; England
- Coordinates: 53.5847°N 2.6296°W
- Grid reference: SD 584 100
- Platforms: 2

Other information
- Status: Disused

History
- Original company: Joint Lancashire and Yorkshire Railway/Lancashire Union Railway
- Pre-grouping: London and North Western Railway
- Post-grouping: London, Midland and Scottish Railway

Key dates
- 1 December 1869: Opened
- 26 September 1949: Closed to passengers
- 2 September 1957: Closed to freight traffic
Location

Red Rock railway station stood in Red Rock, a hamlet between Standish and Haigh, originally in Lancashire now within Greater Manchester, England. The railway station was on the Lancashire Union Railway line that ran from Blackburn via Chorley to Wigan before eventually joining the St Helens Railway.

The former down waiting room at the station was owned and used by the residents of Haigh Hall from the station's inception until the 1940s. The station buildings and goods yard now form part of a private residence.

Preceding station	Disused railways	Following station
White Bear; Line and station closed	London and North Western Railway; Lancashire Union Railway	Boar's Head; Line and station closed
White Bear; Line and station closed	London and North Western Railway; Lancashire Union Railway	Whelley; Line and station closed
