= Cherry Tree railway station =

Railway station in Blackburn, England

Coordinates: 53.733°N 2.518°W

Cherry Tree
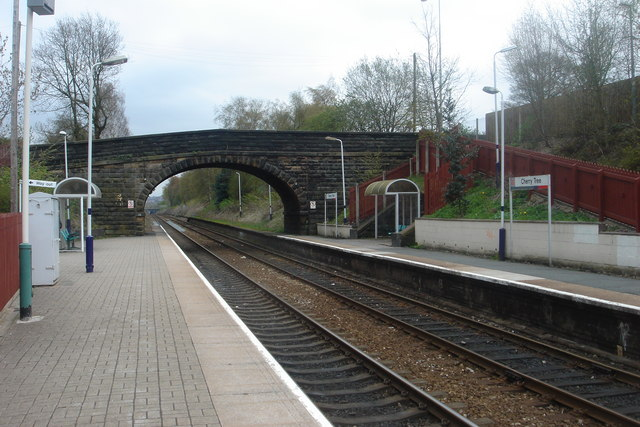

General information
- Location: Cherry Tree, Blackburn with Darwen; England
- Grid reference: SD658264
- Manager: Northern
- Platforms: 2

Other information
- Station code: CYT
- Classification: DfT category F2

History
- Opened: November 1847

Passengers
- 2021/22: ▲34,498
- 2022/23: ▼32,612
- 2023/24: ▲34,104
- 2024/25: ▼33,742
- 2025/26: ▲35,986
Location
Notes
- Passenger statistics from the Office of Rail and Road

Cherry Tree railway station serves Cherry Tree in the Blackburn with Darwen borough of Lancashire, England. The station is 1.9 miles (3 km) southwest of Blackburn railway station. It is managed by Northern, who also provide all the passenger services calling there.

The station is a two-platform stop situated on the A674 road for Blackburn and was opened soon after the Blackburn to Preston line, in 1847. The former Lancashire Union Railway branch line to Chorley, Wigan and St Helens Shaw Street (opened in 1869) diverged a short distance to the west of the station, but this closed to passengers on 4 January 1960 and completely in 1966.

The station is unstaffed, and all of its permanent buildings except shelters on both platforms were demolished. Only the western end of each platform is now used, with the sections east of the bridge on both sides now derelict. A Community Rail Lancashire and local authority-sponsored cleanup and repair project was carried out by local schoolchildren, college students, volunteers and council workers in 2014. The station has a long-line PA system and digital information screens in place to provide train-running information. It also has full step-free access to both platforms for disabled passengers.

In January 2018 new touchscreen ticket machines were installed in stations on this line, including Cherry Tree.

== Services ==
Monday to Saturdays, there is an hourly service from Cherry Tree towards Preston westbound and Blackburn, Burnley Central and Colne, eastbound. There is a two-hourly service in each direction on Sundays.

| Preceding station | National Rail | Following station |
|---|---|---|
| Pleasington | Northern; East Lancashire Line | Mill Hill |
| | Disused railways | |
| Feniscowles | L&YR / LNWR joint Lancashire Union Railway | Mill Hill |
