= Boar's Head railway station =

Disused railway station in Standish, Greater Manchester

Boar's Head
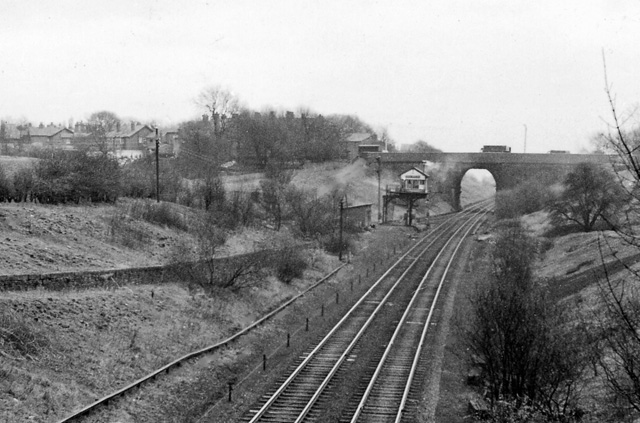
- Station remains in 1962

General information
- Location: Standish, Wigan; England
- Coordinates: 53.5736°N 2.6395°W
- Grid reference: SD577087

Other information
- Status: Disused

History
- Original company: North Union Railway
- Pre-grouping: London and North Western Railway
- Post-grouping: London, Midland and Scottish Railway

Key dates
- 31 October 1838: Station opened
- 1 December 1869: Lancashire Union Railway platforms opened
- 31 January 1949: Station closed
Location

Boar's Head railway station served the southern part of the village of Standish.

== History ==
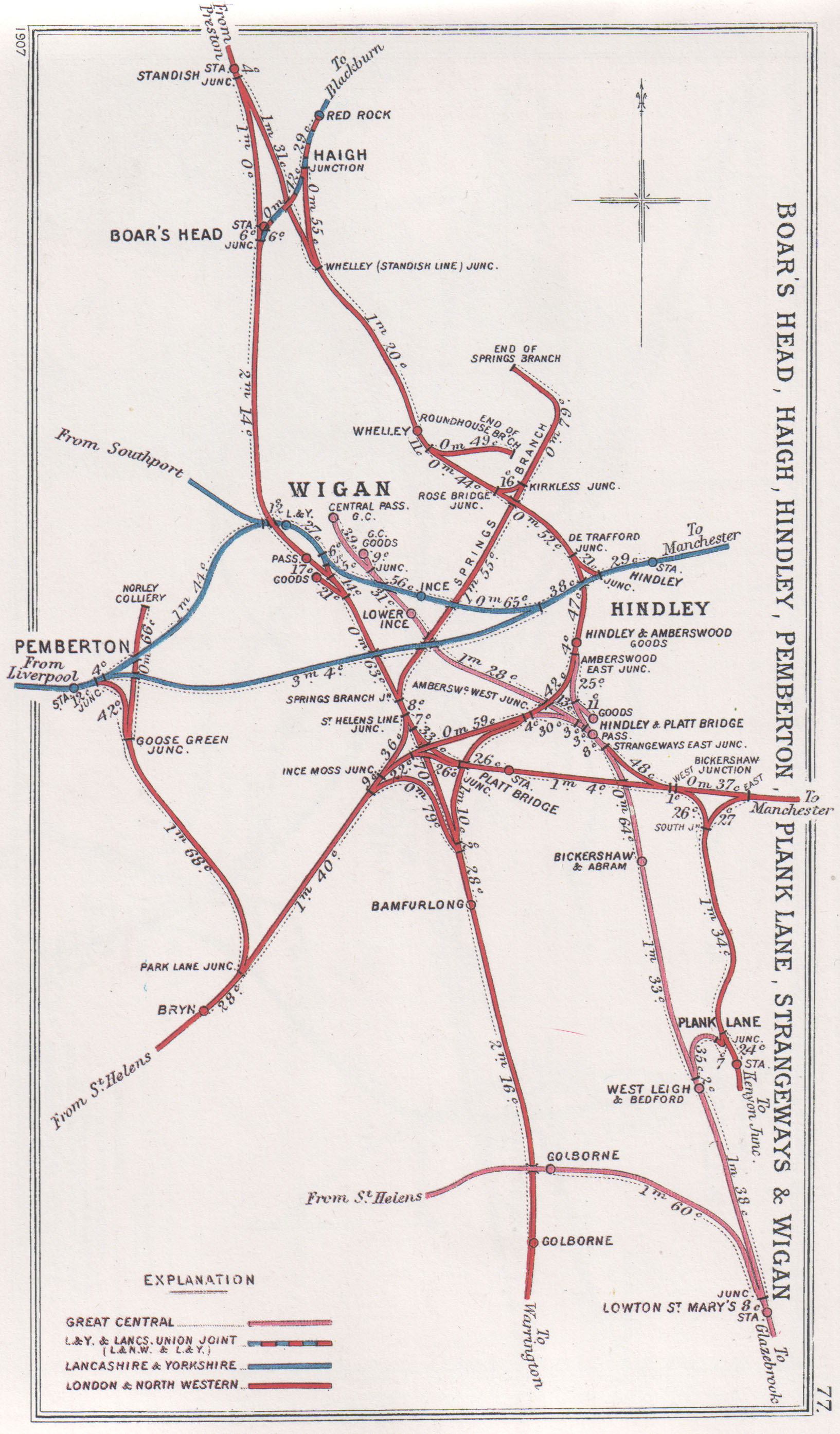
A 1907 Railway Clearing House Junction Diagram showing railways in the vicinity of Boar's Head (upper left)

The Wigan Branch Railway (WBR) was authorised on 29 May 1830 to connect the town of Wigan to the Liverpool and Manchester Railway at Parkside, and it opened on 3 September 1832. A railway route between Wigan and the town of Preston, in the form of the Wigan & Preston Railway, was authorised by Parliament on 22 April 1831; but before it was built, this company amalgamated with the WBR under an Act of 22 May 1834, to form the North Union Railway (NUR) - the first railway amalgamation to be sanctioned by Act of Parliament. The line was opened throughout between Wigan and Preston on 31 October 1838, and Boar's Head station opened the same day; it was the first station on the route to the north of Wigan.

The Lancashire Union Railway route between Wigan and Blackburn via Chorley was authorised on 25 July 1864; it opened on 1 November 1869 for goods trains, and one month later, on 1 December, passenger services began. The LUR diverged from the NUR to the south of Boar's Head station, where additional platforms were provided for this route. Trains on the section between Wigan and Chorley, via Boar's Head, were operated by the London and North Western Railway (LNWR).

The section of the NUR between Parkside and Euxton Junction, which included Boar's Head station, was transferred to the LNWR on 26 July 1889.

The station closed on 31 January 1949.

== Routes ==
Preceding station	Historical railways	Following station
Standish; Line open, station closed	London and North Western Railway; North Union Railway	Wigan North Western; Line and station open
	Disused railways	
Red Rock; Line and station closed	London and North Western Railway; Lancashire Union Railway	Wigan North Western; Line and station open
