= Listed buildings in Livesey =

Livesey is a civil parish in Blackburn with Darwen, Lancashire, England. It contains seven buildings that are recorded in the National Heritage List for England as designated listed buildings, all of which are listed at Grade II. This grade is the lowest of the three gradings given to listed buildings and is applied to "buildings of national importance and special interest". Originally a rural area, the two oldest listed buildings were farmhouses. The Leeds and Liverpool Canal was built through the parish and, associated with this, are a listed bridge and an aqueduct. The parish, which includes the village of Feniscowles and the district of Cherry Tree, later became partly absorbed by the growing population of Blackburn. The listed buildings not noted above are a house, later used as offices, a church, and a vicarage.

== Buildings ==
Name and location	Photograph	Date	Notes
Lower Stockclough; 53.71836°N 2.53287°W		c. 1700 (or earlier)	A former farmhouse in sandstone with concrete tiled roofs in two storeys and two bays. At the rear is a later extension and an outshut. The windows are mullioned. At the rear on the upper floor is the corbelled base of a former garderobe.
Brookside Cottage; 53.72312°N 2.53258°W	—	18th century	Originally a farmhouse, and later used as a house, it is in whitewashed sandstone with a stone-slate roof. The house has two storeys and is in two bays, with a single-storey outshut at the rear. There are two windows in each floor and a doorway with a gabled wooden canopy to the right of centre.
Livesey Hall Bridge; 53.72814°N 2.52609°W		c 1810–15	This is Bridge No. 92 that carries a footpath over the Leeds and Liverpool Canal, It is in sandstone and consists of a single elliptical arch with rusticated voussoirs and keystones, pilastered ends, and a parapet with rounded coping.
Canal aqueduct 53.71603°N 2.53956°W	—	1810–16	The aqueduct carries the Leeds and Liverpool Canal over the River Roddlesworth, and consists of a rusticated sandstone culvert. This is egg-shaped with piers at the outer ends, and a keystone over the arch.
Immanuel Church; 53.72676°N 2.54085°W		1835–36	The church was designed by Revd J. W. Whittaker or Edmund Sharpe. It is built in gritstone with a slate roof, and is in Gothic Revival style. The church consists of a nave and chancel in one cell, a southwest porch, and a west steeple. The steeple has a tower with diagonal buttresses and a recessed spire with lucarnes.
Immanuel Vicarage; 53.72647°N 2.53987°W	—	1836 (probable)	The vicarage is in sandstone with a slate roof, and has two storeys. There is a gabled wing protruding on the left, and a service wing extending to the right. On the front is a porch with a pediment, and at the rear is a Tuscan doorcase. The windows are sashes.
Woodlands; 53.72980°N 2.52754°W	—	Mid 19th century	A house, later used as offices, it is stuccoed with sandstone dressings and a hipped slate roof. The building has two storeys and a square plan, with three bays on each side, and a single-bay service wing to the right. On the front are four giant Tuscan pilasters and a Tuscan doorcase. On the left side is another doorway and two canted bay windows. All the windows are sashes.
