= Garswood railway station =

Railway station in Merseyside, England

Garswood
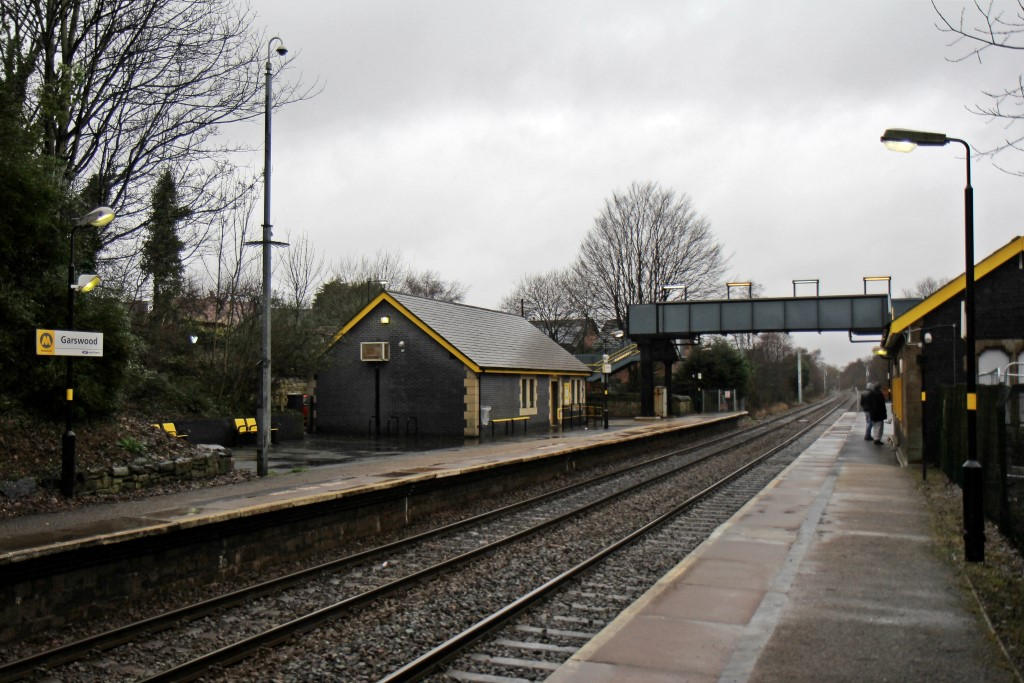
- The station in 2013 prior to electrification

General information
- Location: Garswood, St Helens; England
- Coordinates: 53.4881°N 2.6720°W
- Grid reference: SJ555992
- Manager: Northern Trains
- Transit authority: Merseytravel
- Platforms: 2

Other information
- Station code: GSW
- Fare zone: A1
- Classification: DfT category E

History
- Original company: Lancashire Union Railway
- Pre-grouping: London and North Western Railway
- Post-grouping: London Midland and Scottish Railway

Key dates
- 1 December 1869: Opened

Passengers
- 2020/21: ▼42,170
- 2021/22: ▲0.120 million
- 2022/23: ▼0.117 million
- 2023/24: ▲0.132 million
- 2024/25: ▲0.136 million
Location
Notes
- Passenger statistics from the Office of Rail and Road

Garswood railway station serves the village of Garswood in the Metropolitan Borough of St Helens, Merseyside, England. It is situated on the Merseytravel Liverpool to Wigan City Line, 15 miles (24 km) northeast of Liverpool Lime Street. The station, and all trains serving it, are operated by Northern Trains.

== History ==
The station was opened on 1 December 1869 by the Lancashire Union Railway on their route between St Helens and Blackburn. It later became part of the London and North Western Railway, with through running to Liverpool via Huyton commencing in 1871. Passenger services over the Wigan to Chorley and Blackburn section ended in January 1960.

The line through the station was electrified in May 2015.

== Facilities ==
The station has a ticket office on the northbound platform (1) and a waiting room on platform 2. The ticket office is staffed throughout the hours of service (as is usual for Merseytravel-sponsored stations), seven days per week. Customer help points, digital PIS displays and timetable poster boards are provided to offer train running information. Step-free access is only available to platform 1, as platform 2 (for Liverpool) can only be reached via the footbridge (which has steps).

== Services ==
The station lies within the Merseytravel region, being the final stop on this line to be so, and is priced and ticketed according to this.

During Monday to Saturday daytimes, Garswood is served by trains every 30 minutes in each direction between Liverpool Lime Street and Wigan North Western. A few peak-hour services extend beyond Wigan to and from Preston and Blackpool North.

On Sundays, the service operates hourly in each direction between Liverpool Lime Street and Wigan North Western.

== Gallery ==
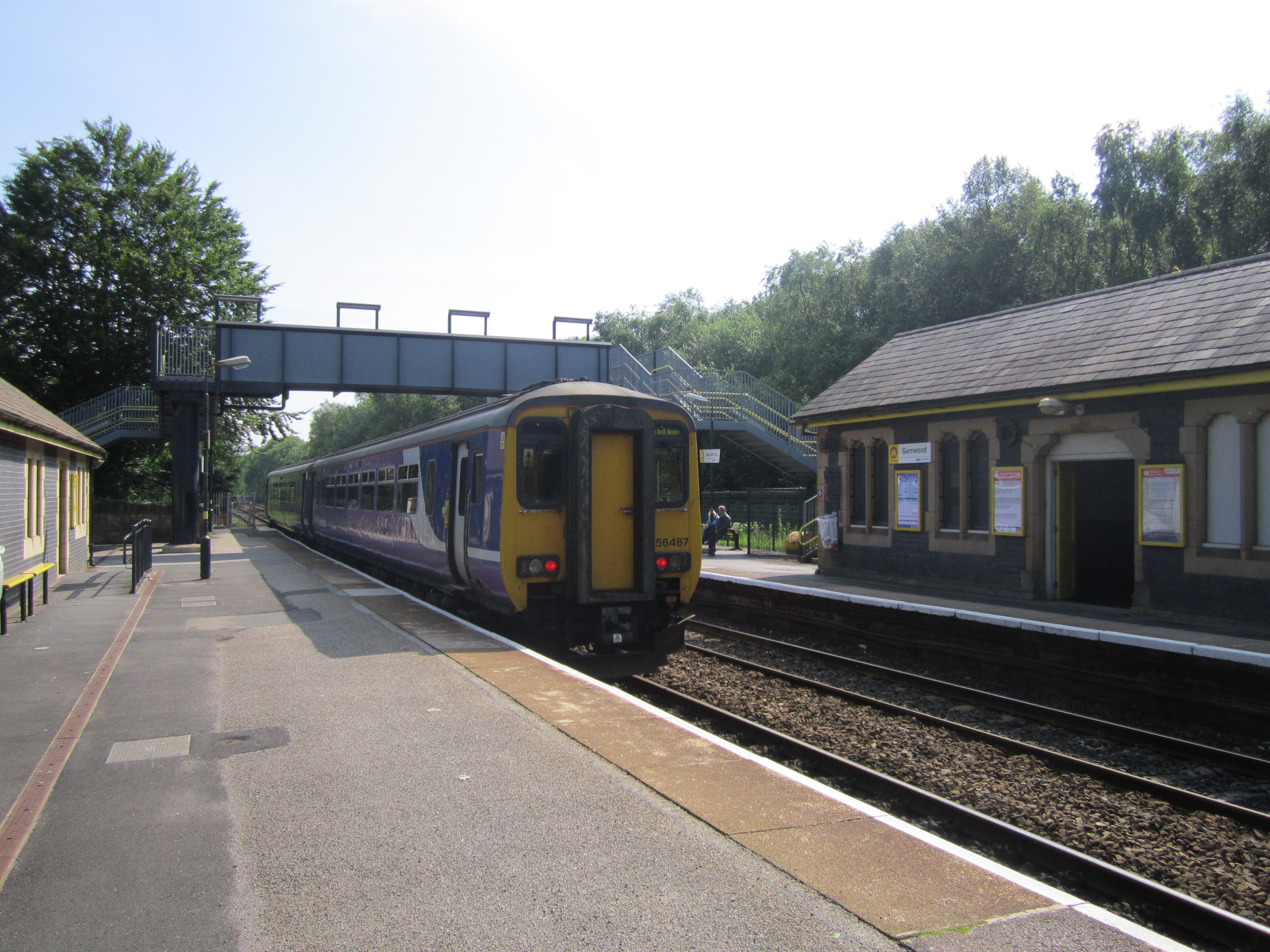
A Northern Rail Class 156 waits at the station.

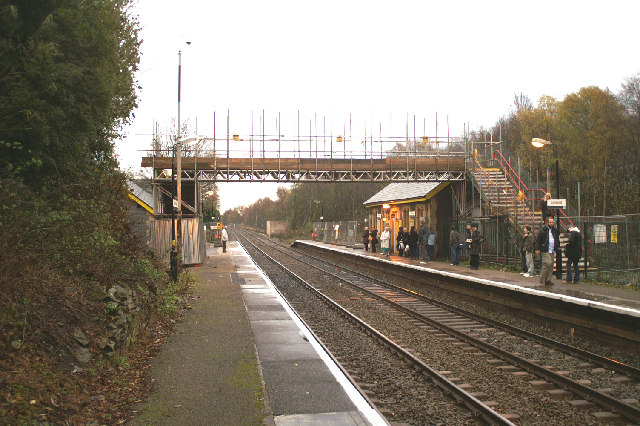
The construction of the new footbridge.

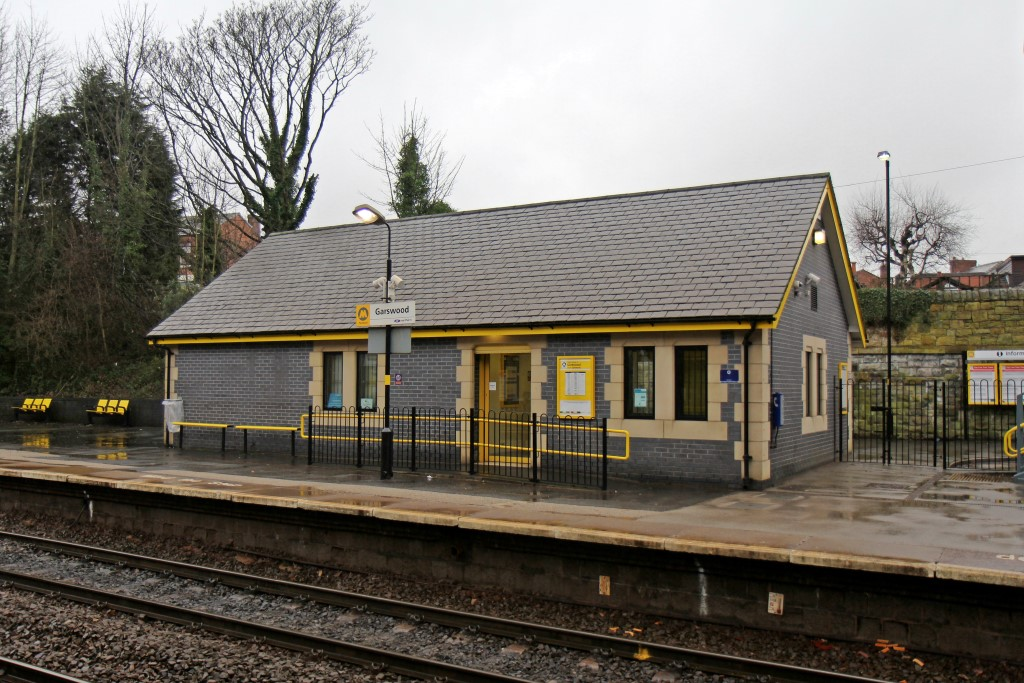
The station building.

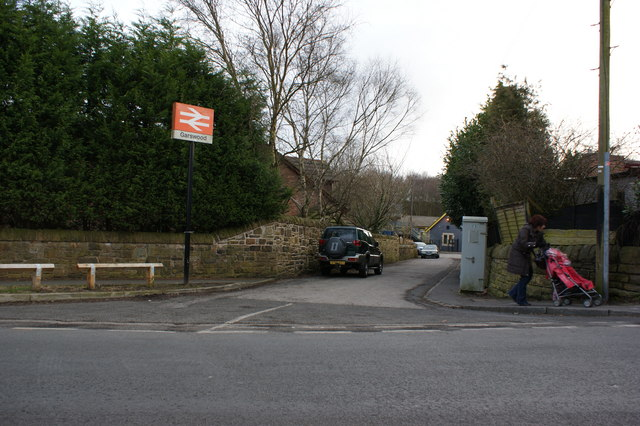
The station approach road.

| Preceding station | National Rail | Following station |
|---|---|---|
| St Helens Central | Northern Trains; City Line (Merseytravel) | Bryn |
| | Historical railways | |
| Carr Mill | London and North Western Railway; Lancashire Union Railway | Bryn |
