= Mill Hill railway station (Lancashire) =

Railway station in Blackburn, Lancashire, England

Mill Hill (Lancashire)
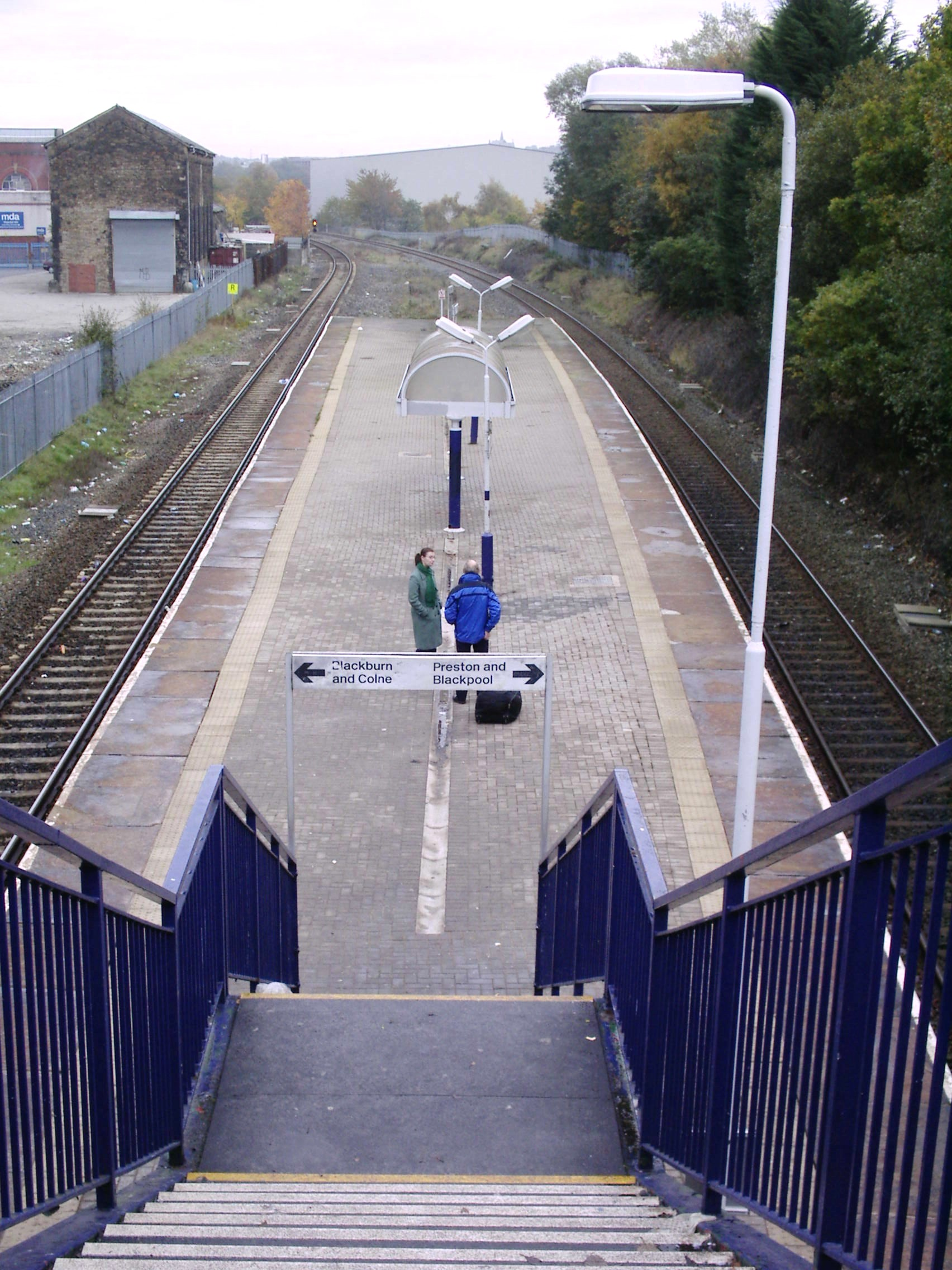

General information
- Location: Mill Hill, Blackburn with Darwen; England
- Coordinates: 53.735°N 2.502°W
- Grid reference: SD670266
- Manager: Northern
- Platforms: 2

Other information
- Station code: MLH
- Classification: DfT category F2

History
- Original company: East Lancashire Railway
- Pre-grouping: Lancashire and Yorkshire Railway
- Post-grouping: London Midland and Scottish Railway

Key dates
- 1 December 1884: Opened

Passengers
- 2021/22: ▲61,612
- 2022/23: ▼59,824
- 2023/24: ▲62,750
- 2024/25: ▼60,484
- 2025/26: ▲62,086
Location
Notes
- Passenger statistics from the Office of Rail and Road

Mill Hill railway station serves Mill Hill in the Blackburn with Darwen borough in Lancashire, England. It is 1 1/4 miles (2.0 km) west of Blackburn railway station. It is an island platformed station managed by Northern. It was opened by the Lancashire and Yorkshire Railway in 1884, almost forty years after the line itself.

It is unstaffed, with no permanent buildings other than basic shelters on the platform. Digital information screens and a P.A system are installed to give intending passengers train running information.

As of January 2018, along with other stations on this line, a new touch screen ticket machine was added to the Station.

It has no step-free disabled access, with an entrance down a single flight of stairs from street level. From the street level above there are also direct bus services to Blackburn town centre. It is the nearest station to Ewood Park, the home of Blackburn Rovers.

== Services ==
Monday to Saturdays, there is an hourly service from Mill Hill towards Preston westbound and an hourly service to Blackburn, Burnley Central and Colne eastbound. A single morning peak service from York to Preston also calls, along with a corresponding evening peak train to Leeds.

There is a two-hourly service in each direction on Sundays.

Preceding station	National Rail	Following station
Cherry Tree	Northern (East Lancashire Line)	Blackburn
	Historical railways	
Cherry Tree	L&YR / LNWR joint Lancashire Union Railway	Blackburn
