= Carr Mill railway station =

Former railway station in England

Carr Mill

General information
- Location: Carr Mill, St Helens, St Helens; England
- Coordinates: 53.4710°N 2.7173°W
- Grid reference: SJ523974
- Platforms: 2

Other information
- Status: Disused

History
- Original company: London and North Western Railway
- Pre-grouping: London and North Western Railway

Key dates
- 1 January 1896: Opened
- 1 January 1917: Closed
Location

Carr Mill railway station was on the Lancashire Union Railway in the Carr Mill area of St Helens, England.

== History ==
The original station opened on 1 January 1896 and closed on 1 January 1917.

== Reopening ==
Proposals to construct a new station to serve the expanding population have been suggested by Merseytravel but funding has yet to arrive. A new proposal to open a station was raised by Metro Mayor of the Liverpool City Region Steve Rotheram as part of his re-election plans in January 2020. The proposal was again raised as part of his re-election plans in 2024, with the new railway station being a priority along with new stations at Daresbury and Woodchurch.

Preceding station	Historical railways	Following station
St Helens; Line and station open	London and North Western Railway; Lancashire Union Railway	Garswood; Line and station open
