= Bryn railway station =

Railway station in Greater Manchester, England

Bryn
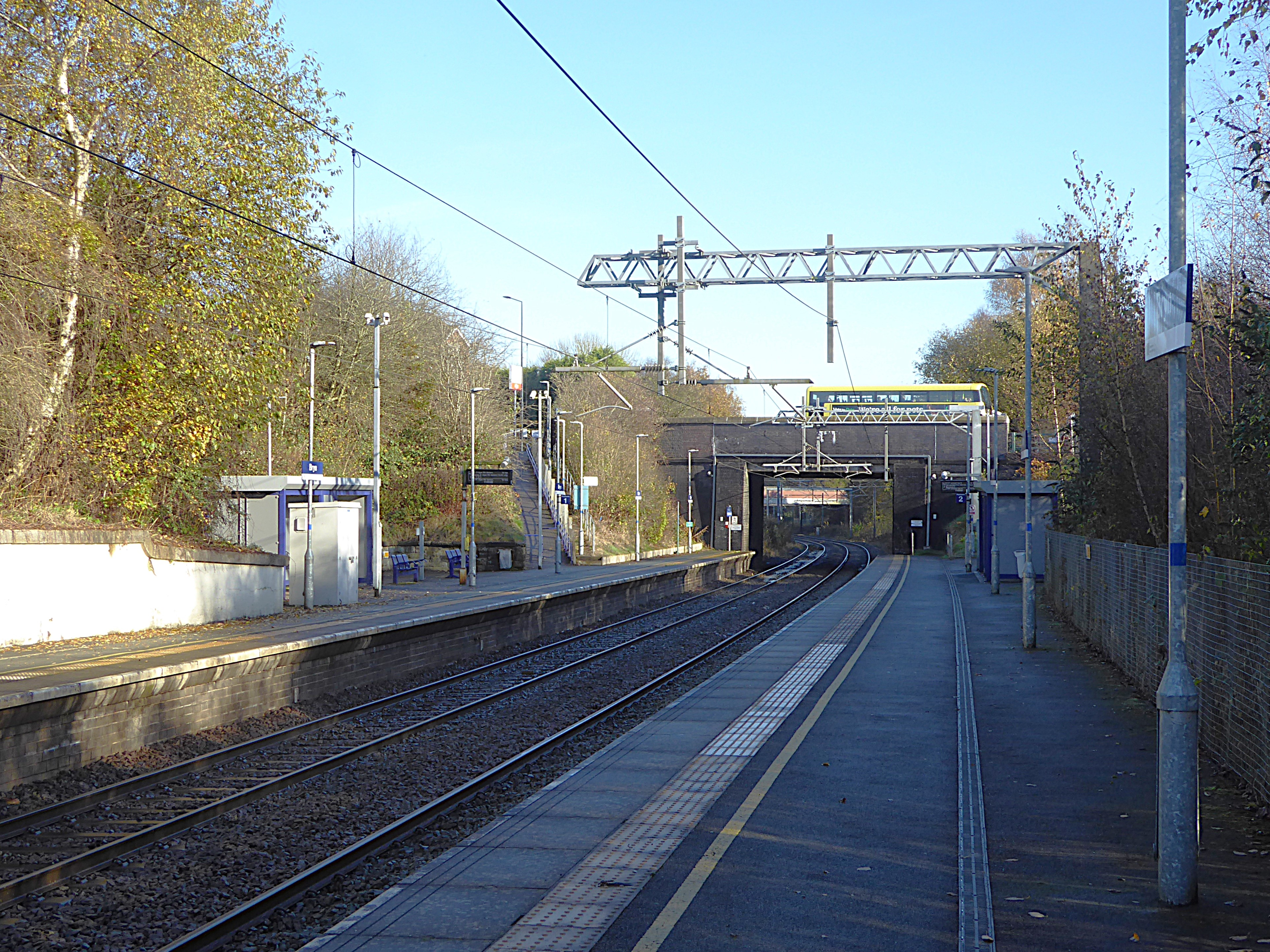

General information
- Location: Bryn, Wigan; England
- Coordinates: 53.4996°N 2.6477°W
- Grid reference: SD571005
- Managed by: Northern Trains
- Transit authority: Greater Manchester
- Platforms: 2

Other information
- Station code: BYN
- Classification: DfT category F1

History
- Opened: 1 December 1869
- Original company: Lancashire Union Railway
- Pre-grouping: London and North Western Railway
- Post-grouping: London Midland and Scottish Railway

Passengers
- 2020/21: ▼33,044
- 2021/22: ▲85,596
- 2022/23: ▼83,486
- 2023/24: ▲98,146
- 2024/25: ▲0.105 million
Location
Notes
- Passenger statistics from the Office of Rail and Road

Bryn railway station is a railway station serving the suburb of Bryn in Ashton-in-Makerfield, Greater Manchester, England. The station is situated on the electrified Liverpool–Wigan line 16 1/4 miles (26.2 km) northeast of Liverpool Lime Street and 3 3/4 miles (6.0 km) south of Wigan. The station, and all trains serving it, are operated by Northern Trains.

== Facilities ==
The station is the only unstaffed one on the Huyton-to-Wigan line, being outside the Merseytravel area (but within that of Transport for Greater Manchester). Ticket machines have recently been installed on both platforms. The old station buildings shown in the caption have since been demolished and were replaced by basic waiting shelters. Digital display screens and timetable poster boards on each side provide train running information. Step-free access is provided only on the Wigan-bound platform.

== Services ==
Monday to Saturday daytimes, there is a half-hourly service to Wigan North Western northbound and Liverpool Lime Street southbound. Evenings there is an hourly service in each direction.

From 10 December 2017 there has been an hourly service on Sundays, to Blackpool North northbound and Liverpool Lime Street southbound for the first time in many years.

== History ==
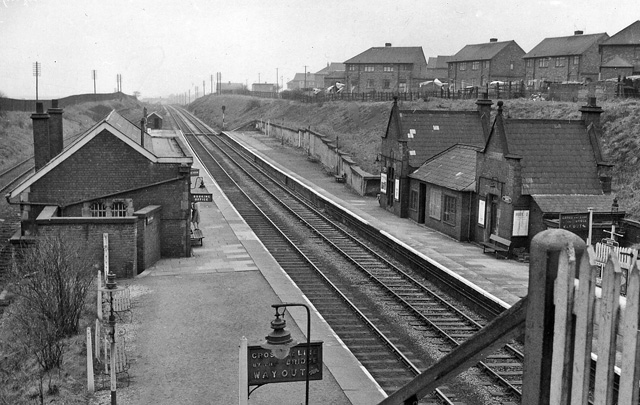
The station in 1962

The station was opened on 1 December 1869 by the Lancashire Union Railway on its route between St Helens and Blackburn via Wigan and Chorley. The line beyond Wigan was closed to passengers in January 1960 and completely in 1971.

=== Electrification ===
The Liverpool-to-Manchester line electrification also encompasses the entire Liverpool-to-Wigan route. This allows electric trains to operate from Bryn to Liverpool, St Helens and Wigan. Electrification was completed in May 2015.

Preceding station	National Rail	Following station
Garswood	Northern Trains; Liverpool to Wigan Line	Wigan North Western
	Historical railways	
Garswood	London and North Western Railway; Lancashire Union Railway	Wigan
Garswood	London and North Western Railway; Lancashire Union Railway	Amberswood (Hindley)
