= Immanuel Church, Feniscowles =

Coordinates: 53.7268°N 2.5408°W

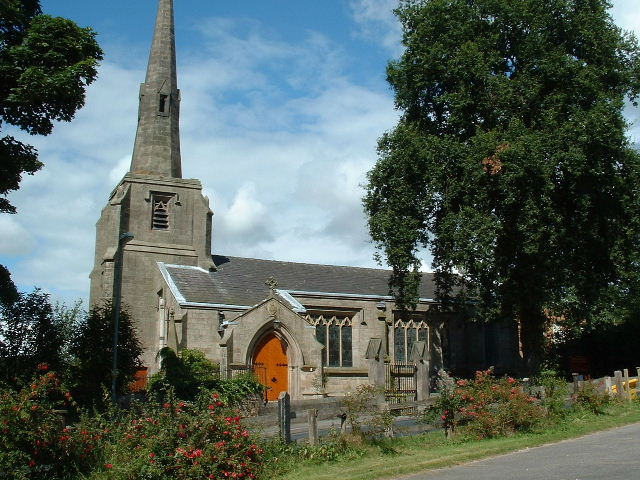
- Immanuel Church, Feniscowles, from the southwest

- Location in Blackburn with Darwen
- OS grid reference: SD 644 257
- Location: Feniscowles, Blackburn, Lancashire
- Country: England
- Denomination: Anglican
- Website: Immanuel, Feniscowles

History
- Status: Parish church
- Consecrated: 10 October 1836

Architecture
- Functional status: Active
- Heritage designation: Grade II
- Designated: 27 September 1984
- Architect: J. W. Whittaker (?)
- Architectural type: Church
- Style: Gothic Revival
- Groundbreaking: 1835
- Completed: 1836

Specifications
- Materials: Gritstone, slate roof

Administration
- Diocese: Blackburn
- Archdeaconry: Blackburn
- Deanery: Blackburn with Darwen
- Parish: Immanuel, Feniscowles

Clergy
- Vicar: Bryn Naylor

Immanuel Church is in the village of Feniscowles, near Blackburn, Lancashire, England. It is an active Anglican parish church in the deanery of Blackburn with Darwen, the archdeaconry of Blackburn, and the diocese of Blackburn. The church is recorded in the National Heritage List for England as a designated Grade II listed building.

== History ==
The church was built in 1835–36. Its architect is uncertain. In the Buildings of England series Hartwell and Pevsner credit the design to J. W. Whittaker, the Vicar of Blackburn. In the National Heritage List for England it is credited to Whittaker's cousin, the Lancaster architect Edmund Sharpe. Whittaker certainly made the first design for the church, but whether this was replaced or amended by Sharpe is uncertain. The church cost £1,000 (equivalent to £100,000 in 2025). The foundation stone was laid on 5 February 1835 by William Feilden, who had given the land for the church, and paid £100 towards its construction. The church was consecrated on 10 October 1836. It was restored in 1931–32 by Austin and Paley, the successors in Sharpe's practice. During the restoration the original box pews were removed, a pulpit and chancel screen were added, the lower part of the walls were panelled, and the church was re-floored.

== Architecture ==
=== Exterior ===
Immanuel Church is constructed in gritstone with a slate roof. Its plan consists of a nave and chancel in one cell, a southwest porch, and a west tower with a spire. The tower is short, in two stages, and is embraced by the nave. It has diagonal buttresses, a two-light west window, and rectangular louvred bell openings. The spire is set back and contains lucarnes. There were originally eight pinnacles, but these were removed because of erosion. The windows on the sides of the church are large and straight-headed, with Perpendicular tracery. The east window contains Decorated tracery.

=== Interior ===
Inside the church is a west gallery carried on slim iron columns. The stained glass in the east window is dated 1861 and is possibly by Hardman & Co. On the north side of the church are windows dating from the early 20th century by Heaton, Butler and Bayne, and on the south side, dated 1907, are windows by Curtis, Ward and Hughes. The two-manual organ in the west gallery was built by Jardine and Company in 1949, when some of the pipes from the earlier organ built in 1899 by Ernest Wadsworth were reused. The church bell is an eighteenth-century Javanese bell with a dated Javanese inscription originally from Gresik in East Java and donated by a member of the Feilden family who served in Egypt, India and Java during the Napoleonic Wars.

== See also ==
- Listed buildings in Livesey
