= Botany Bay (Chorley) =

Coordinates: 53°39′55″N 2°36′58″W

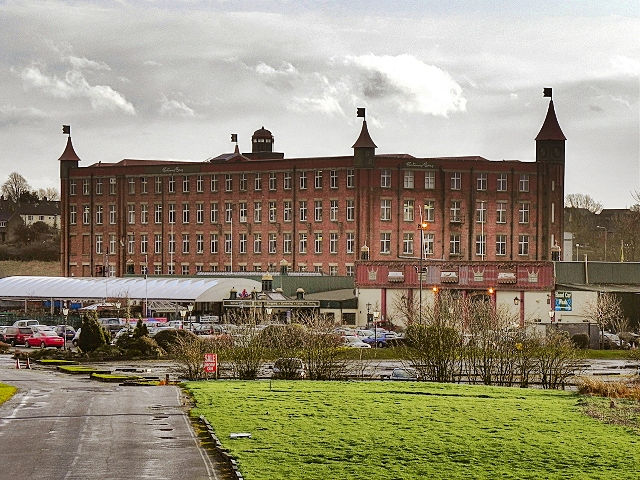
The former Botany Bay shopping centre

Botany Bay refers to an area on the outskirts of Chorley alongside the Leeds and Liverpool Canal. It was instrumental in transport for North West England and was home to several mills during the Industrial Revolution. The earliest proof of settlements in the Botany Bay area, formerly known as Knowley Moss, date back to 1734 as shown on the map of Chorley at this time. It was not until the late 18th century that Knowley began to develop further when the site was earmarked as the main port for the Chorley area.

== Canal building ==
During the construction of the Lancaster Canal, Botany Bay played host to the canal workers, and it is believed the name Botany Bay originated from around this time, due to the nature of the navvies occupying the area the locals saw it as an area to be avoided, much like the penal colony at Botany Bay Australia. By 1816 The Leeds and Liverpool Canal had come to incorporate the Lancaster Canal and by this time Botany Bay had become an important loading and unloading area due to its warehouse system and proximity to the canal.

== Shopping centre ==
The mill was used as a shopping centre from 1995 to 2019. A proposed retail park was planned but axed due to the Covid 19 pandemic.

== Transport ==
Due to the canal Botany Bay became a hub for transport, as early as 1830 services ran from Botany Bay wharf to Manchester, Wigan and Liverpool as well as others. This contributed greatly to Botany Bay's importance in both the cotton trade and increasing communication in the local area.

1869 saw the opening of the Lancashire Union Railway which ran through Botany Bay, this was facilitated by the construction of a viaduct across the canal which was used primarily to transport coal between Wigan and Blackburn. The track was completed entirely from steel rails and cost £530,000 to construct. The railway line was also used extensively during the First World War to transport wounded soldiers to Liverpool and the viaduct remained in service until 1968 when it was demolished for the construction of the M61 motorway.

== Helipad ==
Botany Bay has its own Helipad.
