= Amberswood railway station =

Disused railway station in Greater Manchester, England

Amberswood (Hindley)

General information
- Location: Hindley, Wigan; England
- Coordinates: 53.5365°N 2.5882°W
- Grid reference: SD611045
- Platforms: 2

Other information
- Status: Disused

History
- Original company: Lancashire Union Railway

Key dates
- 1 January 1872: Station opened
- 1 March 1872: Station closed to passengers
- c1970: Station closed completely
Location

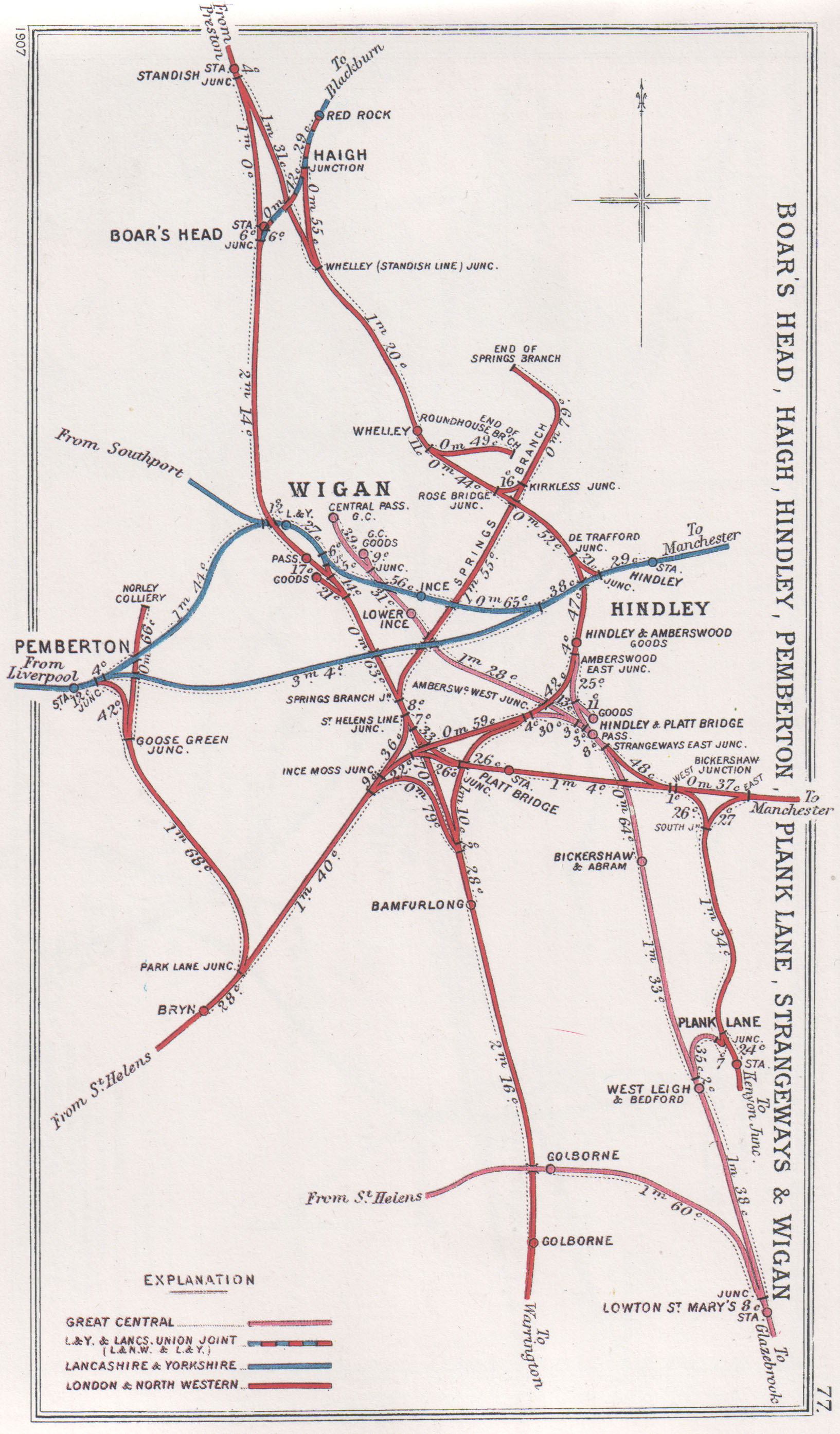
Lines around Wigan in 1907

Amberswood (Hindley) railway station was in Hindley, Wigan (now in Greater Manchester, England) on the Whelley Loop section of the Lancashire Union Railway. The station was situated where the A577 passed under the line.

== History ==
The two stations on the Whelley Loop - Amberswood and Whelley - are believed to be among the shortest lived passenger stations in the country, opening at the beginning of 1872 and closing in March of the same year. Their goods yards remained open until the Whelley loop closed in the 1970s.

== Services ==
The key purpose of the Whelley Loop was to enable trains to avoid Wigan. It is therefore surprising that passenger stations were even constructed on the loop. All lines to or through Wigan were radial, as the accompanying map shows. The loop was connected to every one of them, allowing trains arriving at Wigan from all points except Southport and Pemberton to leave Wigan to all points, without gridlocking the centre.

The dominant traffic was goods, especially coal, but passenger diversions used the line from time to time.

The loop came into its own in passenger terms with Summer seaside specials, notably to and from Blackpool. Pixton, for example, has a fine 1961 shot of a Summer Saturday Sheffield to Blackpool train at Lowton St Mary's. It would bear right at Hindley South onto the Whelley Loop and then join the WCML at Standish, bypassing Wigan altogether.

== Accident ==
On 24 July 1900, a passenger train was derailed at Amberswood, killing one person.

== The station in the 21st Century ==
The station has been demolished. The trackbed is a public footpath.

| Preceding station | Disused railways | Following station |
|---|---|---|
| Whelley; Line and station closed | London and North Western Railway; Lancashire Union Railway | Hindley South; Line and station closed |
| Whelley; Line and station closed | London and North Western Railway; Lancashire Union Railway | Bamfurlong; Line and station closed |
| Whelley; Line and station closed | London and North Western Railway; Lancashire Union Railway | Bryn; Line closed, station open |
