= Chorley Interchange =

Bus station in Lancashire, England

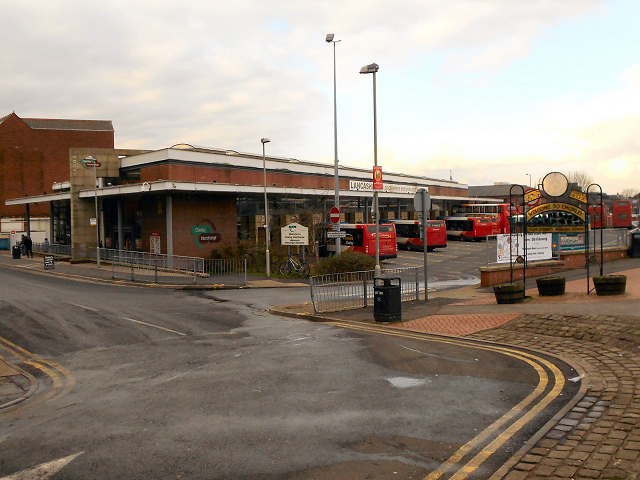
- Chorley Interchange in December 2015

General information
- Location: Clifford Street, Chorley; Chorley
- Coordinates: 53.6528°N 2.6282°W
- Owner: Lancashire County Council
- Operator: Stagecoach Merseyside & South Lancashire
- Bus stands: 15
- Bus operators: Go North West; Blackburn Bus Company; Stagecoach Merseyside & South Lancashire; Tyrers Coaches, Vision Bus and Preston Bus
- Connections: Chorley railway station

History
- Opened: February 2003
Location
- Location within the Borough of Chorley

Chorley Interchange is a bus station in Chorley, England.

== History ==
Chorley Interchange opened in February 2003 replacing the previous structure. It is owned by Lancashire County Council and operated by Stagecoach Merseyside & South Lancashire. This facility features an enclosed passenger waiting area, a coffee shop, and a taxi rank.

== Bus services ==
The majority of services that serve Chorley Interchange are run by Stagecoach Merseyside & South Lancashire. The remainder of the services are operated by Go North West, Blackburn Bus Company, Vision Bus, and, to a lesser extent, Tyrers of Adlington.

Buses go from Chorley to Blackburn, Bolton, Leyland, Manchester, Ormskirk, Preston, and Southport along with several local services previously branded as Network Chorley.

== Train services ==
Chorley railway station is served by trains operated by Northern Trains to Blackpool North, Preston, Bolton, Manchester (Piccadilly and Manchester Airport).
