= Heapey railway station =

Railway station in Heapey, England

Coordinates: 53.6717°N 2.5918°W

Heapey

General information
- Location: Heapey, Chorley, Lancashire; England
- Platforms: 2

Other information
- Status: Disused

History
- Original company: Lancashire Union Railway
- Pre-grouping: Joint Lancashire and Yorkshire Railway and London and North Western Railway
- Post-grouping: London, Midland and Scottish Railway

Key dates
- 1869: Opened
- January 1960: Closed to passengers
- April 1966: Closed to all traffic
Location
- Location within the Borough of Chorley Location within Lancashire

Heapey railway station served the village of Heapey, in Lancashire, England.

== History ==
The station was opened by the Lancashire and Yorkshire Railway on the Blackburn to Chorley Line. In 1960 the station was closed to passengers, although goods traffic survived until 1966.

== Services ==
Preceding station	Disused railways	Following station
Brinscall	L&YR / LNWR joint Lancashire Union Railway	Chorley
