= Livesey =

Civil parish in Lancashire, England

Coordinates: 53.7222°N 2.5168°W

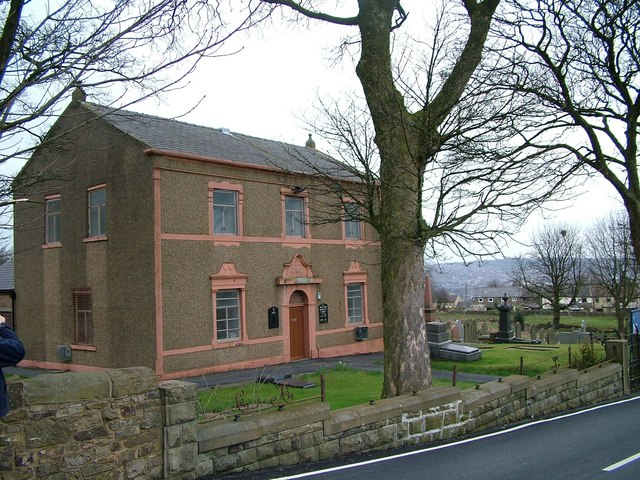
New Row Methodist Church

Livesey is a civil parish in the unitary borough of Blackburn with Darwen, in the ceremonial county of Lancashire, England. The population of the civil parish at the 2011 census was 6,202.

== Toponymy ==
Its name likeliest came from Old English Lēofes īeg = "Lēof's island" or Lēofsiges īeg = "Lēofsige's island", where, as often in place names of Old English origin, "island" here means "low-lying flat land by a river" (here the River Darwen).

== Location ==
Lying to the south west of Blackburn, Livesey contains most of the suburb of Cherry Tree, including its railway station and the majority of the village of Feniscowles. Despite the name of the parish, most of the suburb of Livesey, including the council estate, is outside the parish. The southern boundary follows the route of the M65 motorway, other major roads in the parish are the A6062 Livesey Branch Road and the A674 Preston Old Road. Livesey Hall, built in 1605 was situated in the Cherry Tree area but was demolished in 1968. Brief attempts to mine coal in a field to the west of the site of the Hall were made between 1854 and 1859. All that remains to be seen of this endeavour is the cap of one of the shafts. The parish formed one parish with Tockholes until 1688.

The Anglican parish church of St Andrew was founded in 1877. Services are every Sunday at 9.30.

New Row Methodist church was founded in 1828.

== See also ==
- Listed buildings in Livesey
