= Brinscall railway station =

Disused railway station in England

Coordinates: 53.68916°N 2.56466°W

Brinscall
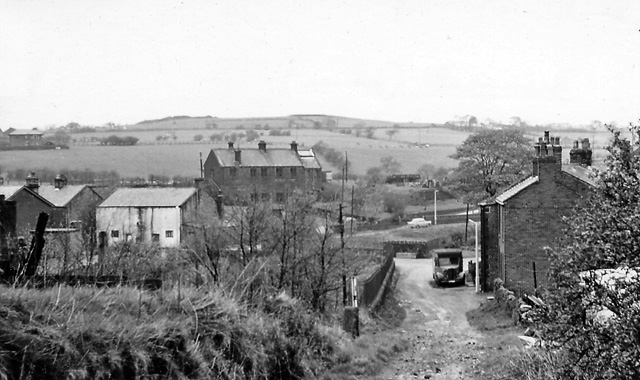
- View towards the former station (1965)

General information
- Location: Brinscall, Chorley, Lancashire; England

Other information
- Status: Disused

History
- Original company: Lancashire Union Railway
- Pre-grouping: Joint Lancashire and Yorkshire Railway and London and North Western Railway
- Post-grouping: London, Midland and Scottish Railway

Key dates
- 1 December 1869: Opened
- January 1960: Closed to passengers
- 30 January 1966: Closed for goods
Location
- Location within the Borough of Chorley Location within Lancashire

Brinscall railway station was a railway station that served the village of Brinscall, Lancashire, England.

== History ==
The station was opened by the Lancashire and Yorkshire Railway. It was on the Blackburn to Chorley Line. On 4 January 1960 the station closed to passengers, although goods traffic survived until 1966. No trace of the station now exists due to redevelopment which lowered the land level and subsequent property (bungalow) construction. However, a very small section of stone wall at the one time goods yard entrance is still visible.

== Services ==
| Preceding station | Disused railways | Following station |
|---|---|---|
| Withnell | L&YR / LNWR joint Lancashire Union Railway | Heapey |
