= White Bear railway station =

Former railway station in England

White Bear

General information
- Location: Adlington, Chorley, Lancashire; England
- Coordinates: 53.61244°N 2.60681°W
- Platforms: 2

Other information
- Status: Disused

History
- Original company: Joint Lancashire and Yorkshire Railway/Lancashire Union Railway
- Pre-grouping: London and North Western Railway
- Post-grouping: London, Midland and Scottish Railway

Key dates
- 1 December 1869: Opened
- 4 January 1960: Closed to passengers
- October 1971: Line closed to all traffic
Location

White Bear railway station, on Station Road, Adlington, Lancashire, England, was on the Lancashire Union Railway line between St Helens and Blackburn. The station was named in some timetables as White Bear (Adlington) or White Bear for Adlington.

The station opened on 1 December 1869 one month after the line that it was situated on, the Lancashire Union Railway from Boars Head Junction in Standish to Rawlinson Bridge, opened for goods traffic. Passenger services also opened on the same date at Boars Head Junction and at Red Rock.

The joint line was constructed because the Wigan coal owners wanted better transportation links to the mills and factories of East Lancashire. The coal owners also wanted a line that would allow trains to go south and gain direct access to Garston Dock where shipping charges were far less than Liverpool dock.

The station was closed to passengers on 4 January 1960, but the line was used for freight and diversions until 1971.

Adlington railway station, serving the Manchester to Preston Line, is now the sole station in the village.

The tracks have been lifted and the station site has been completely built over.

Preceding station	Disused railways	Following station
Chorley; Line closed, station open	London and North Western Railway; Lancashire Union Railway	Red Rock; Line and station closed
