= Withnell railway station =

Former railway station in England

Coordinates: 53.7005°N 2.5479°W

Withnell
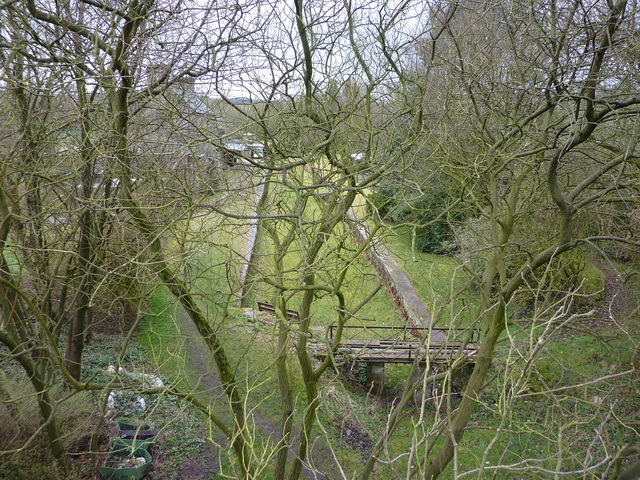
- The former station (2011)

General information
- Location: Abbey Village, Chorley, Lancashire; England

Other information
- Status: Disused

History
- Original company: Lancashire Union Railway
- Pre-grouping: Joint Lancashire and Yorkshire Railway and London and North Western Railway
- Post-grouping: London, Midland and Scottish Railway

Key dates
- 1869: Opened
- January 1960: Closed to passengers
Location

Withnell railway station was a railway station that served Abbey Village and Withnell, in Lancashire, England.

== History ==
The station was opened by the Lancashire and Yorkshire Railway. It was on the Blackburn to Chorley Line. In January 1960, the station was closed following the withdrawal of the Wigan–Chorley–Blackburn passenger service. Goods traffic continued to pass through the station until 1966, when the line closed completely. The area where the track once was, is now a public footpath, and there is a nature reserve on the track bed.

== Services ==
Preceding station	Disused railways	Following station
Feniscowles	L&YR / LNWR joint Lancashire Union Railway	Brinscall
