= Feniscowles =

Village in Lancashire, England

Coordinates: 53.726°N 2.538°W

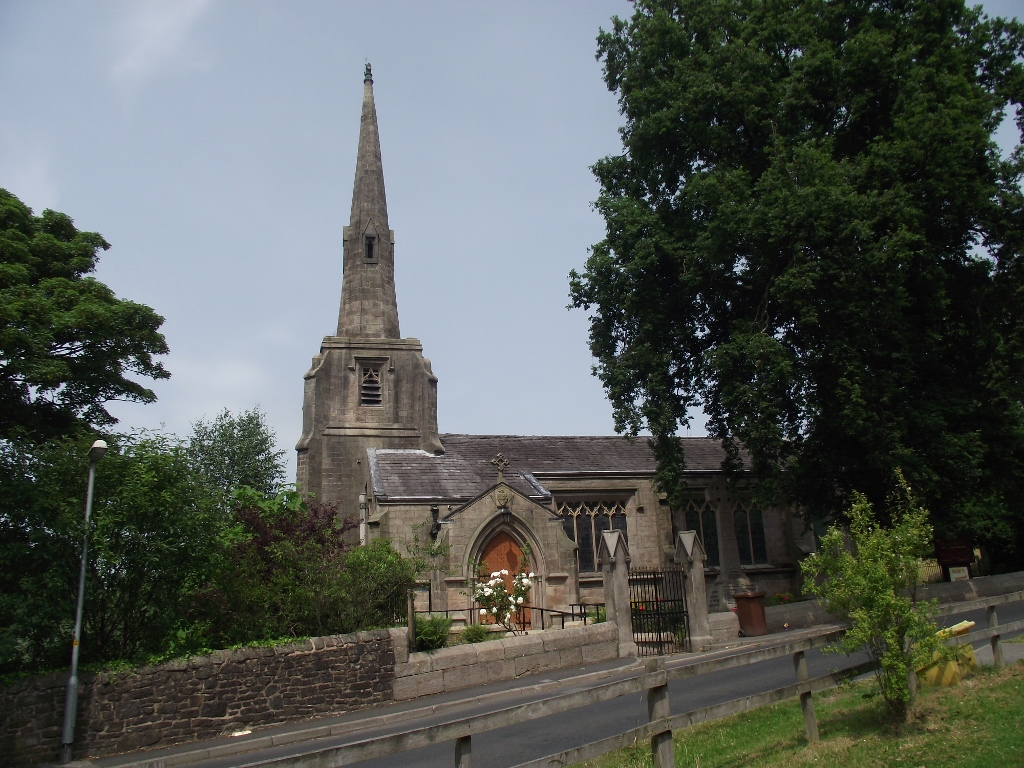
- Immanuel Parish Church, Feniscowles

- Shown within Blackburn with Darwen Location within Lancashire
- OS grid reference: SD645257
- Civil parish: Livesey
- Unitary authority: Blackburn with Darwen
- Ceremonial county: Lancashire
- Region: North West
- Country: England
- Sovereign state: United Kingdom
- Post town: BLACKBURN
- Postcode district: BB2
- Dialling code: 01254
- Police: Lancashire
- Fire: Lancashire
- Ambulance: North West
- UK Parliament: Blackburn

Feniscowles is a village in the unitary authority of Blackburn with Darwen, Lancashire, England. It lies approximately 3 miles (4.8 km) west of Blackburn, in the civil parish of Livesey.

== Description ==
The village is primarily a suburb of Blackburn, off Preston Old Road near the boundary with the borough of Chorley. The village's Park Farm and Feniscowles Bridge neighborhoods are home to an abundance of homes established during the 1960s.

The village is on the Leeds and Liverpool Canal. Bridge 92, to the south of the village, also known as Millfield Bridge, is a Grade II listed structure and is described by English Heritage as: "Accommodation bridge over Leeds-Liverpool Canal. 1811-16, Supervising Engineer probably Joseph Priestley. Squared sandstone. Elliptical portal with rusticated voussoirs and keystone, band, parapet with ridge coping, pilastered ends to curved keepers".

The village also lies on the Blackburn to Chorley railway line, which was built in 1866–69. The village's railway station closed in 1960, with the line closing completely in 1968. Industry in the village includes a Sappi Blackburn Mill, originally built in 1875 as the Star Paper Mill. Another paper mill, also built in the 1870s and known as the Sun Paper Mill, closed in 1992 and has now been demolished.

On the edge of the village, next to the River Darwen is Feniscowles New Hall, now a ruin but in the 19th century the home of the Feilden family.

In the village there is a school called Feniscowles Primary.

== History ==
The village is mentioned in documents as early as 1276, when its name was recorded as 'Feinycholes'.

Feniscowles Old Hall was built in the 15th century on the north bank of the River Darwen. In the 1800s, Feniscowles was a hamlet with a population of around 60 people.

== See also ==
- Immanuel Church, Feniscowles
