= Feniscowles railway station =

Former railway station in England

Coordinates: 53.7221°N 2.5334°W

Feniscowles

General information
- Location: Feniscowles, Blackburn with Darwen, Lancashire; England
- Grid reference: SD649251

Other information
- Status: Disused

History
- Original company: Lancashire Union Railway
- Pre-grouping: Joint Lancashire and Yorkshire Railway and London and North Western Railway
- Post-grouping: London, Midland and Scottish Railway

Key dates
- 1 December 1869: Opened
- 4 January 1960: Closed to passengers
Location

Feniscowles railway station was a railway station that served the village of Feniscowles, in Blackburn with Darwen in Lancashire, England.

== History ==
The station was on the Blackburn to Chorley Line, and was closed in 1960 when passenger services were withdrawn from the route. Freight services on the line continued until 1966, when the line was closed between Chorley and Feniscowles. Two years later the line between Feniscowles and Cherry Tree junction was closed. The station has now been demolished.

== Services ==
Preceding station	Disused railways	Following station
Cherry Tree	L&YR / LNWR joint Lancashire Union Railway	Withnell
