= Standish railway station =

Former railway station in England

Standish
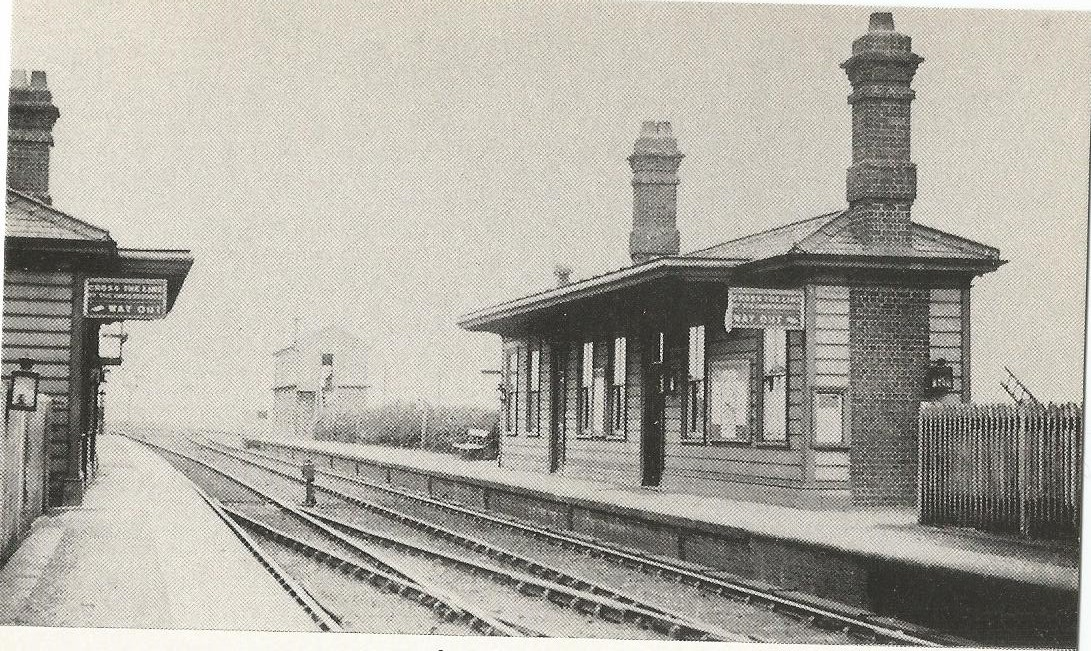

General information
- Location: Standish, Wigan; England
- Coordinates: 53°35′20″N 2°38′34″W
- Grid reference: SD576103
- Platforms: 2

Other information
- Status: Disused

History
- Pre-grouping: North Union Railway; London and North Western Railway
- Post-grouping: London, Midland and Scottish Railway

Key dates
- 31 October 1838: Station opened as "Standish Lane"
- by 1844: Station renamed "Standish"
- 23 May 1949: Station closed
Location

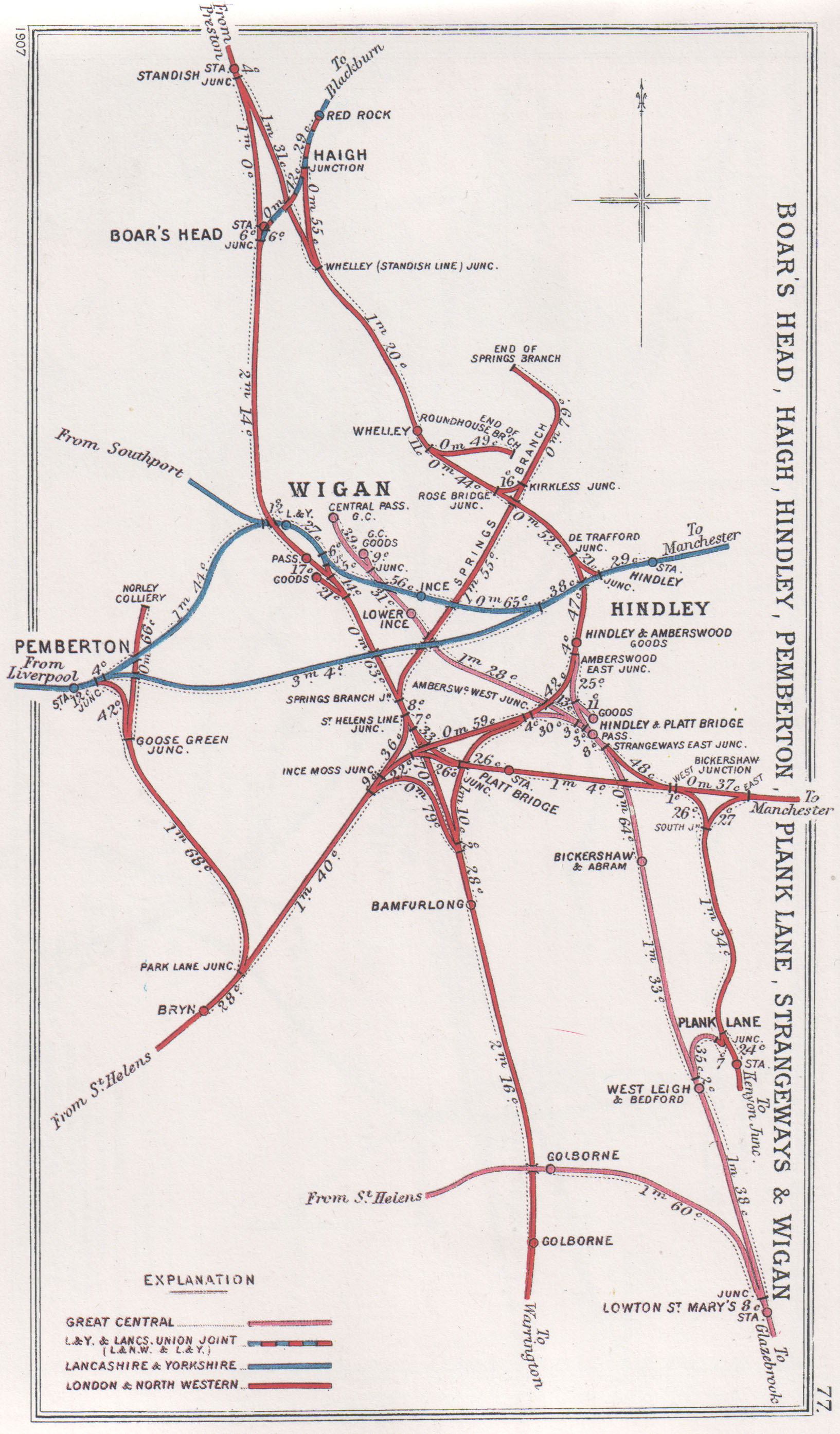
Lines around Wigan in 1907

Standish railway station is a closed railway station in Standish, England, situated where the line bridged Rectory Lane (the B5239).

Standish was in the historic county of Lancashire.

== History ==
The station was opened by the North Union Railway in 1838 as "Standish Lane". It was renamed as plain "Standish" by 1844. The North Union later became part of the London and North Western Railway.

The station joined the London Midland and Scottish Railway during the Grouping in 1923 and passed to the London Midland Region of British Railways on nationalisation in 1948.

The station closed in May 1949.

== Services ==
In 1922 eight "Down" (northbound) services called at Standish on Mondays to Saturdays. Most were local services, with a Saturdays Only "Parliamentary", calling at most stations in a five and a half hour journey from Crewe to Carlisle. No trains called on Sundays. The "Up" service was similar.

Preceding station	Disused railways	Following station
Boar's Head	West Coast Main Line; North Union Railway	Coppull
