= Lancashire Union Railway =

UK railway company

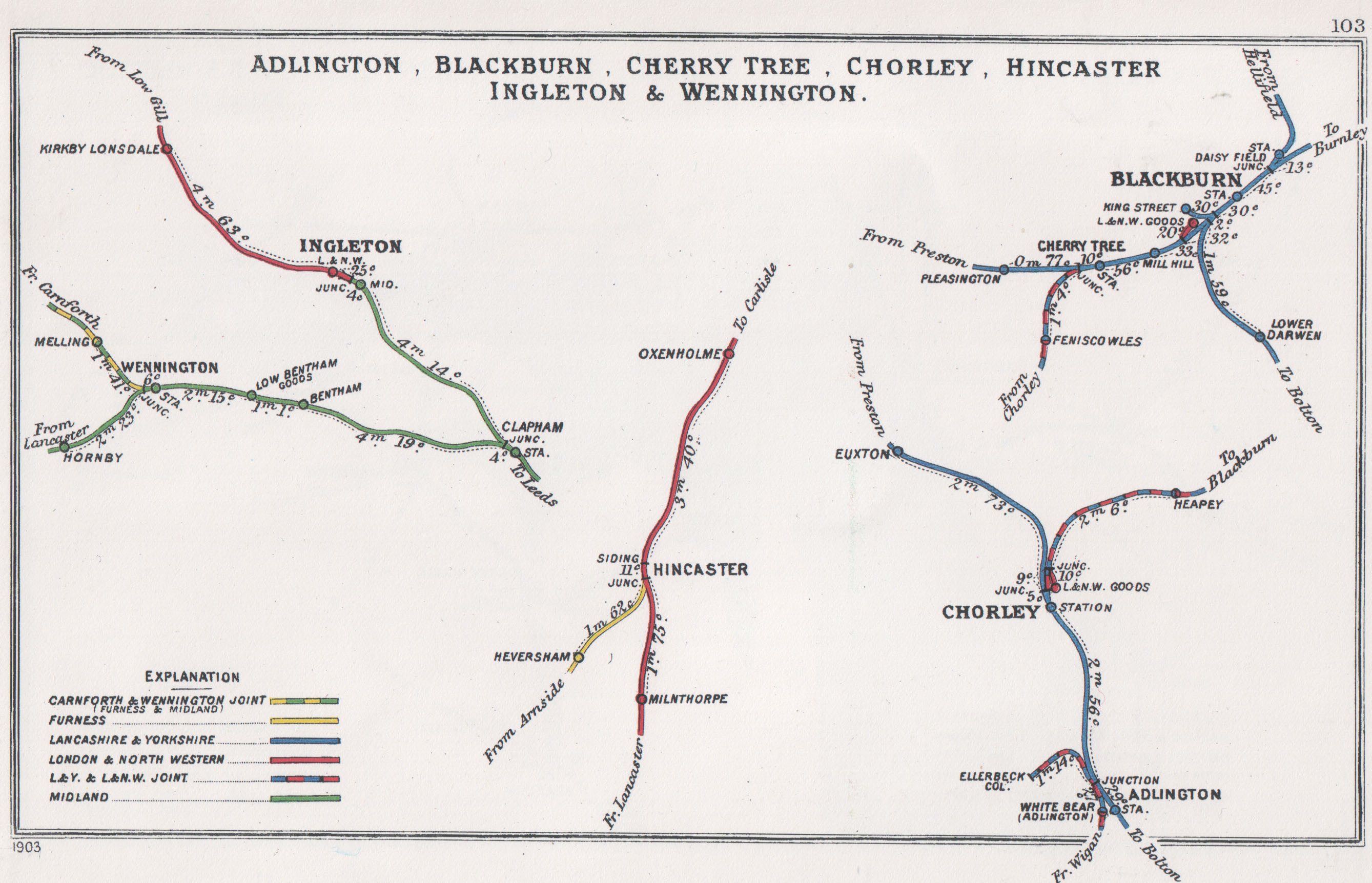
Lines around Chorley and Blackburn in 1903 (right of diagram)

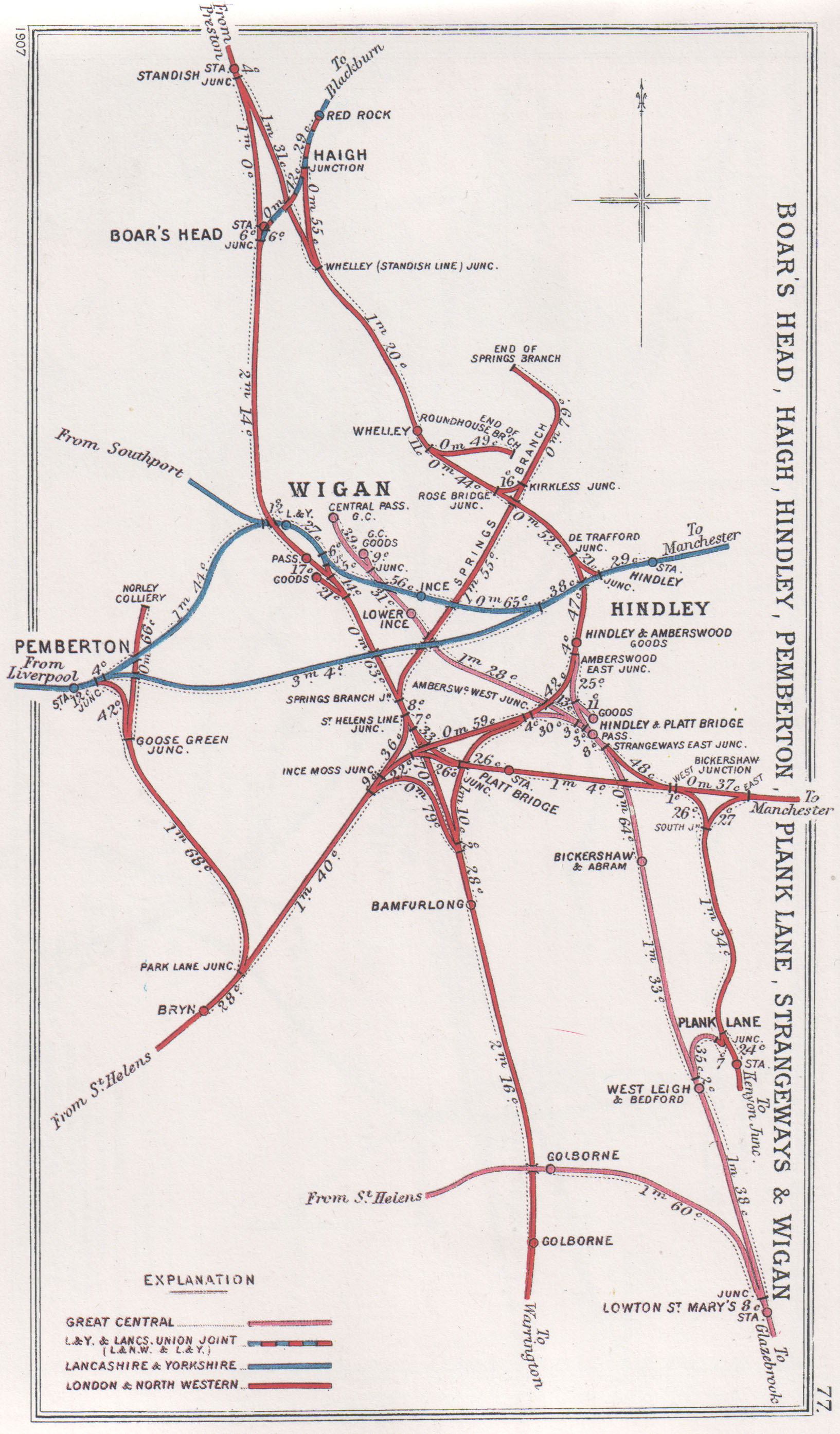
Lines around Wigan in 1907

The Lancashire Union Railway ran between Blackburn and St Helens in Lancashire, England. It was built primarily to carry goods between Blackburn and Garston Dock on the River Mersey, and also to serve collieries in the Wigan area. Most of the line has now been closed, except for the St Helens-to-Wigan section that forms part of the main line between Liverpool and the North.

== History ==
Lancashire Union Railways Act 1864
- Act of Parliament
- Parliament of the United Kingdom
- Long title: An Act for the Construction of Railways in the County of Lancaster, to be called "The Lancashire Union Railways;" and for other Purposes.
- Citation: 27 & 28 Vict. c. cclxxiii

Dates
- Royal assent: 25 July 1864

Text of statute as originally enacted

Lancashire and Yorkshire and Lancashire Union Railways Act 1865
- Act of Parliament
- Parliament of the United Kingdom
- Long title: An Act to vest in the Lancashire and Yorkshire Railway Company and the Lancashire Union Railways Company jointly certain Portions of Railway near Blackburn.
- Citation: 28 & 29 Vict. c. xxi

Dates
- Royal assent: 26 May 1865

Lancashire Union Railways Act 1865
- Act of Parliament
- Parliament of the United Kingdom
- Long title: An Act to empower the Lancashire Union Railways Company to construct an Extension Line to Saint Helens and other Branches in the County of Lancaster; and for other Purposes.
- Citation: 28 & 29 Vict. c. cxciii

Dates
- Royal assent: 29 June 1865

Text of statute as originally enacted

Lancashire and Yorkshire and Lancashire Union Railways Act 1868
- Act of Parliament
- Parliament of the United Kingdom
- Long title: An Act to confer further Powers on the Lancashire and Yorkshire Railway Company, and on the Lancashire Union Railways Company, with respect to certain Railways in Lancashire authorized to be constructed by them severally or jointly.
- Citation: 31 & 32 Vict. c. cxiv

Dates
- Royal assent: 13 July 1868

Lancashire Union Railways Act 1868
- Act of Parliament
- Parliament of the United Kingdom
- Long title: An Act for authorizing the Abandonment of a Portion of the Undertaking of the Lancashire Union Railways Company, and for extending the Time for the Completion of other Portions thereof; and for other Purposes.
- Citation: 31 & 32 Vict. c. cxv

Dates
- Royal assent: 13 July 1868

Lancashire Union Railways Act 1871
- Act of Parliament
- Parliament of the United Kingdom
- Long title: An Act for the abandonment of a portion of one of the authorised Railways of the Lancashire Union Railways Company; and for other purposes.
- Citation: 34 & 35 Vict. c. x

Dates
- Royal assent: 25 May 1871

Text of statute as originally enacted

Lancashire Union Railways Act 1877
- Act of Parliament
- Parliament of the United Kingdom
- Long title: An Act for empowering the Lancashire Union Railways Company to connect their Railway with the North Union Railway, and to raise additional Capital; and for other purposes.
- Citation: 40 & 41 Vict. c. lvii

Dates
- Royal assent: 28 June 1877

Text of statute as originally enacted

The Lancashire Union Railway (LUR) was authorised by the Lancashire Union Railways Act 1864 (27 & 28 Vict. c. cclxxiii) of 25 July 1864, to build a line from the Blackbrook branch of the St Helens Railway to Adlington on the Bolton-to-Preston line of the Lancashire and Yorkshire Railway (LYR) near Chorley. This connected with the existing lines between Garston Dock and St Helens. A further act of Parliament, the Lancashire Union Railways Act 1868 (31 & 32 Vict. c. cxv) of 13 July 1868, authorised an extension from Chorley to Blackburn, and the Lancashire and Yorkshire and Lancashire Union Railways Act 1865 (28 & 29 Vict. c. xxi) vested the section between Boar's Head (on the North Union Railway (NUR) north of Wigan) and Cherry Tree (on the LYR near Blackburn) jointly with the LYR.

The whole line between St Helens and Blackburn opened to passengers on 1 December 1869. Most passenger services were local between Blackburn and Wigan. London and North Western Railway (LNWR) trains travelled to the station later known as Wigan North Western via Chorley and Boar's Head, but LYR trains used an alternative route between Chorley and the station later to become Wigan Wallgate via Hindley.

The LUR also built a line, the "Whelley Loop", that bypassed Wigan to the east. It opened in 1869, mainly for freight. Stations at Whelley and Amberswood were open for only three months between 1 January and 1 March 1872. Additional connections were made to the NUR's West Coast Main Line north and south of Wigan in 1882 and 1886 respectively, and to other lines radiating from Wigan, thus allowing many trains to bypass Wigan.

Under the London and North Western Railway (New Railways) Act 1883 (46 & 47 Vict. c. cx) the Lancashire Union Railway Company was vested jointly between the LNWR and LYR from 16 July 1883, until the two parent companies merged on 1 January 1922.

The Blackburn-to-Chorley line closed to passengers on 4 January 1960 and to goods in 1966, although a short section between Cherry Tree and Feniscowles continued until 1968. The Chorley-to-Wigan line also closed to passengers in 1960, and to goods on 25 May 1971. The Whelley Loop survived until 1976. The Wigan-to-St Helens section is still in use as part of the Liverpool to Wigan Line.

== Route ==
The line began at Blackburn and followed the East Lancashire Line to Cherry Tree where the line branched to Feniscowles; there remnants of the bridge that carried the railway over the A6062 Livesey Branch Road can clearly be seen. From there the line is more or less undeveloped except that gravel and rails are missing; the line carries on where the M65 motorway is now, towards Withnell.

The line between Withnell and Brinscall now forms Railway Park. Leaving Brinscall the line ran parallel to Lodge Bank Road and has been built on. At Brinscall Hall there is an old bridge carrying the railway over a footpath which is still intact. The line of the railway is still evident as it passes Wheelton Plantation towards Heapey. Before Heapey the line passes the former ROF Heapey site where there were sidings serving the plant. Heapey Station is now a private residence. The line had another siding which intersected two of the Heapey reservoirs before serving the Heapey Bleachworks; half of the bridge carrying the line over Higher House Lane to the works is still in situ. The line continued under a bridge under Tithe Barn Lane toward the Blackburn–Chorley road (again under an existing bridge) towards the arched viaduct at Botany Bay which carried the line over the Leeds and Liverpool Canal towards Chorley. The viaduct was demolished in 1968 to make way for the M61 motorway.

The line continued past the North Gate estate and past the rear of St. Joseph's Church where it crossed Highfield Road and ran parallel to the Manchester to Preston Line on an embankment (now a footpath). The line headed towards where Friday Street car park now stands where it merged with the main line and entered Chorley station. The LUR uses the main line to Adlington where the line branched off and under the A6 along the Leeds-Liverpool Canal and on to White Bear Station. On leaving the station the line continued parallel to the canal bypassing the town of Blackrod to the east.

The line followed the canal to the station at Red Rock. It continued south and split as it neared Pendlebury Lane. The first route – the Whelley Loop which bypassed Wigan – was built to serve collieries and iron works before the loop split at De Trafford junction joining the Manchester to Southport Line just before Hindley railway station to the East and to Amberswood to the West, before re-joining the LUR at Bryn or heading further south to Warrington via the NUR. The second route headed over a viaduct, the 13 bridges which carried the railway over the River Douglas. The bridges are known locally as the dominoes due to the position and shape of the pillars and are the only parts left standing. After the viaduct the line continued to Boar's Head before connecting with the Blackpool to Liverpool Line. The line then continued through Wigan North Western before heading towards Bryn and Garswood before eventually joining the St Helens and Runcorn Gap Railway and continuing to that line's southern terminus at Garston Dock.

== Notes ==
=== Bibliography ===
- Awdry, C. (1990), Encyclopaedia of British Railway Companies, Patrick Stephens Ltd, Wellingborough, ISBN 1-85260-049-7.
- Butt, R. V. J. (October 1995). The Directory of Railway Stations: details every public and private passenger station, halt, platform and stopping place, past and present (1st ed.). Sparkford: Patrick Stephens Ltd. ISBN 978-1-85260-508-7. OCLC 60251199. OL 11956311M.
- Daniels, Gerald David; Dench, Leslie Alan (September 1964). Passengers No More (1st ed.). Shepperton: Ian Allan. VPNM/1354/138/CXX-964.
- Dewick, T. (2002), Complete Atlas of Railway Station Names, Ian Allan Publishing, ISBN 0-7110-2798-6.
- Marshall, John (1970). The Lancashire & Yorkshire Railway, volume 2. Newton Abbot: David & Charles. ISBN 0-7153-4906-6.
- Marshall, J. (1981). Forgotten Railways: North-West England. Newton Abbot: David & Charles. ISBN 0-7153-8003-6.
- Suggitt, G. (2003, reprinted 2004), Lost Railways of Lancashire, Countryside Books, Newbury, ISBN 1-85306-801-2.
- Suggitt, G. (2004), Lost Railways of Merseyside and Greater Manchester, Countryside Books, Newbury, ISBN 1-85306-869-1.
- Wignall, C. J. (1983). Complete British Railways Maps and Gazetteer, from 1830–1981 (1st ed.). Oxford: Oxford Publishing Company. ISBN 0-8609-3162-5. OCLC 10360638.
- Wignall, C. J. (1985). Complete British Railway Maps and Gazetteer 1825–1985 (2nd ed.). Poole, UK: Oxford Publishing Company. ISBN 0-8609-3294-X.
