= Chorley railway station =

Railway station in Lancashire, England

Coordinates: 53.653°N 2.627°W

Chorley
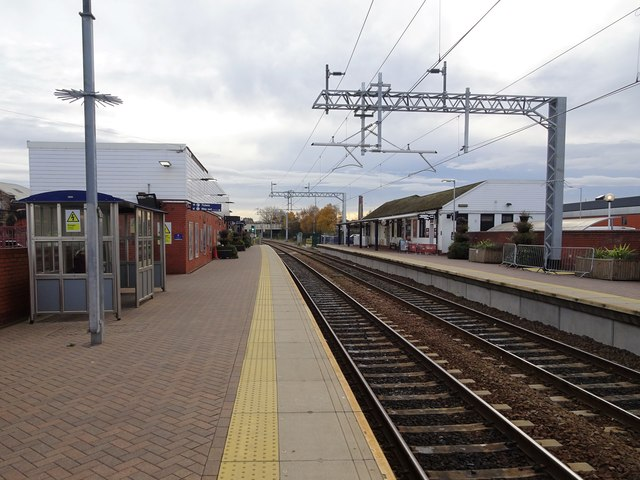

General information
- Location: Chorley, Chorley; England
- Grid reference: SD586175
- Manager: Northern Trains
- Platforms: 2

Other information
- Station code: CRL
- Classification: DfT category D

History
- Opened: 1841

Passengers
- 2020/21: ▼0.160 million
- 2021/22: ▲0.493 million
- 2022/23: ▲0.560 million
- 2023/24: ▲0.622 million
- 2024/25: ▲0.716 million
Location
Notes
- Passenger statistics from the Office of Rail and Road

Chorley railway station serves the town of Chorley in Lancashire, England. Since 2004 it has been linked with Chorley Interchange bus and coach station. It is on the Manchester–Preston line.

== History ==
The current railway station is a modern version from the 1980s that was built on top of the original station. The level of the old platforms can be seen under the existing station's two platforms which are connected by underpass. The initial station was opened on 22 December 1841 by the Bolton and Preston Railway (which later became part of the Lancashire and Yorkshire Railway) and was subsequently served by the Lancashire Union Railway between St Helens, Wigan North Western and Blackburn from 1869. Passenger trains over this route (between Blackburn & Wigan) were however withdrawn in January 1960. Further work was done in 2016 and 2017 in connection with the electrification of the line between Euxton Junction and Manchester.

The level crossing at the south end of the station was removed and the signal box was moved to the Ribble Steam Railway at Preston.

It was announced by the Department for Transport in December 2009, the line between Preston and Manchester, on which Chorley is situated, would be electrified which would reduce journey times to Manchester by up to ten minutes.

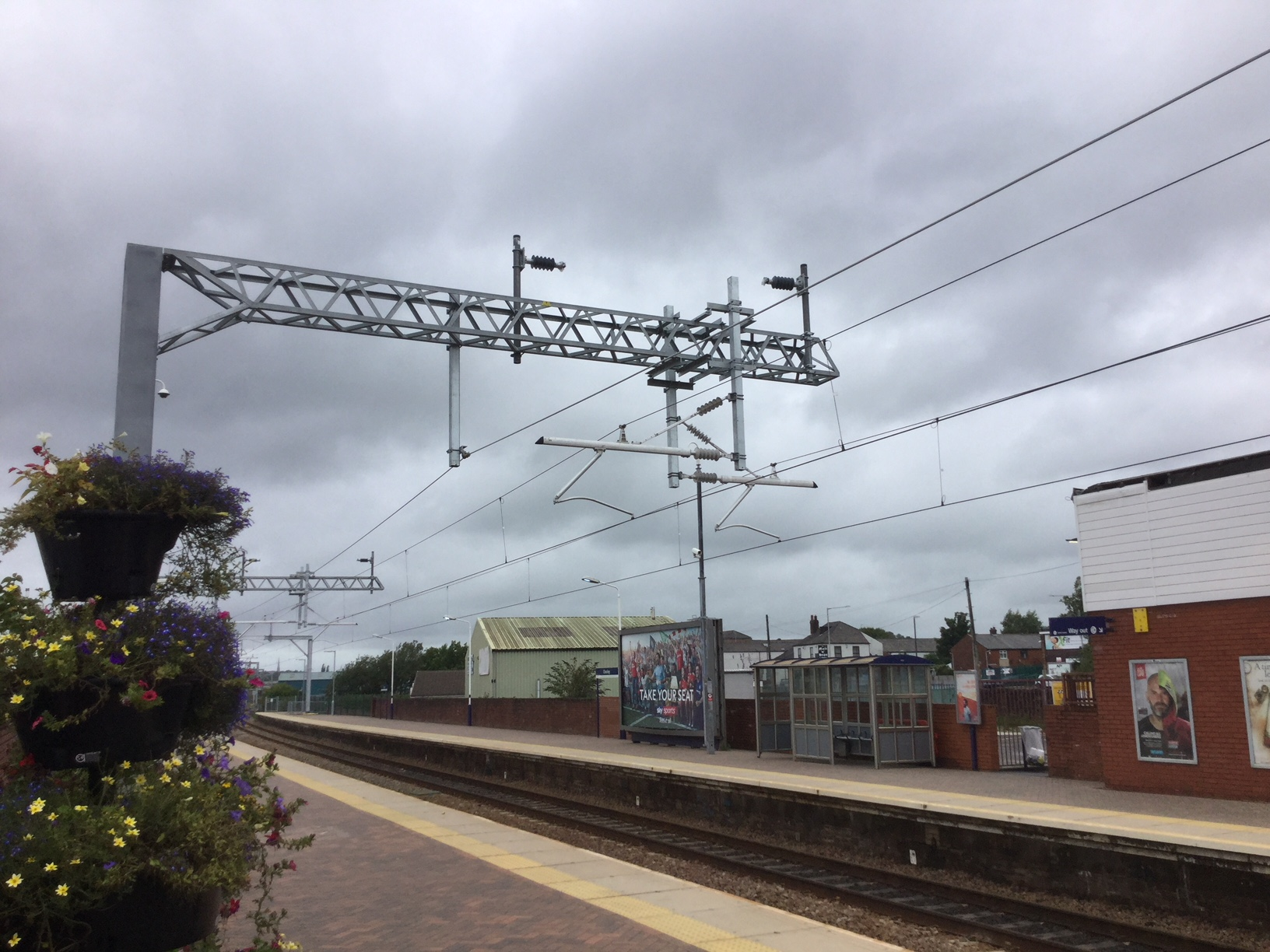
Chorley railway station undergoing electrification work on 27 August 2018

From June to October 2016, as part of the Manchester-Preston electrification scheme, the station was renovated and the trackbed lowered slightly to accommodate the overhead wires. The subway roofs were also replaced and both platforms have been rebuilt and extended to accommodate longer trains.

The badly-delayed electrification work on the route saw further timetable alterations and rail replacement buses at weekends since the May 2018 timetable change. Some northbound trains now terminated at either Buckshaw Parkway or Preston instead of running through to Blackpool, whilst weekend engineering possessions saw buses replacing trains until November 2018.

The first electric train to run through the station was a Virgin Pendolino, on a test run during the night of 13 December 2018.

Electric trains, serving the station, commenced on 11 February 2019 utilising Class 319 electric multiple units.

Lifts are currently in the process of being installed at Chorley station, as part of Northern's Access for All scheme. The lifts will connect the ticket office and platform 1 to the subway and from the subway to platform 2. The lifts were planned to be complete by early 2024 but work is still in progress as of August 2024. The ticket office layout has been altered to make space for them.

== Facilities ==
Platform to platform connection is via a stepped subway. Wheelchair users may exit the station and use the sloped public footpath subway (Chorley FP 32) immediately to the south, this emerges at the foot of the Railway Pub, access is then via an entry off Friday Street.

There is a disabled toilet in the station building which can be accessed by a RADAR key. The closest public toilets are in the bus station across the road. Chorley's rail services provide a link for the commuters of Lancashire to Preston, Manchester and Bolton.

A chargeable railway car park is available to the south of the station with car parking tickets available for purchase from the station ticket office.

The ticket office is staffed and tickets must be purchased from the ticket office before boarding the train. Outside of these times, ticket purchase, promise-to-pay & collection machines are available, two on Platform 2 (Manchester bound), and two in the ticket office.

== Services ==
All trains that stop at Chorley station are operated by Northern Trains

=== Northbound ===
- 2tph to Blackpool North (1tph on Sundays)
- 1tph to Lancaster, with 11tpd continuing to Barrow-in-Furness and 4tpd continuing to Windermere

=== Southbound ===
- 3tph to Manchester Airport via Manchester Piccadilly
  - 2tph semi-fast, calling at local stations to Bolton, then running fast to Manchester (1tph on Sundays)
  - 1tph fast, calling at Bolton only before Manchester.

From 26 July to 7 September 2008, the service provision to and from the station was limited due to major engineering work taking place to the north; this was to improve drainage in a cutting and remove a long-standing speed restriction. A rail replacement bus service operated to and from Preston, whilst many trains were diverted via Wigan. This period of disruption was blamed for the decline in passenger usage shown in the figures shown above.

The direct Scottish service had been reduced at the December 2013 timetable change, when most trains were diverted via Wigan to join the newly electrified line over Chat Moss. A small number of peak services still operated via Chorley using Class 185 diesel multiple units thereafter, but these ceased at the December 2014 timetable change.

First TransPennine Express used to run the service from Manchester Airport to Blackpool North, but this was passed on to the new Northern franchise on 1 April 2016.

Saturday and Sunday services were replaced by buses on most weekends from May 2015 until November 2018, due to the late-running electrification work on the route. Weekend services resumed on Sunday 11 November 2018, after the completion of the electrification engineering work.

Preceding station	National Rail	Following station
Buckshaw Parkway	Northern Trains Manchester–Preston line	Adlington
Buckshaw Parkway	Northern Trains Manchester–Preston line	Horwich Parkway
Preston	Northern Trains Manchester Airport - Lancaster	Bolton
Preston	Northern Trains Manchester Airport - Lancaster	Horwich Parkway
	Historical railways	
Euxton (L&Y); Line open, station closed	Lancashire and Yorkshire Railway; Bolton and Preston Railway	Adlington; Line and station open
	Disused railways	
Heapey; Line and station closed	London and North Western Railway; Lancashire Union Railway	White Bear; Line and station closed
