= Middleton-on-Lune railway station =

Former railway station in Westmorland, England

Middleton-on-Lune

General information
- Location: Middleton, Westmorland and Furness, Cumbria; England
- Coordinates: 54.2883°N 2.5739°W
- Grid reference: SD62708823
- Platforms: 2

Other information
- Status: Disused

History
- Original company: Lancaster and Carlisle Railway
- Pre-grouping: London and North Western Railway
- Post-grouping: London, Midland and Scottish Railway

Key dates
- 16 September 1861: Opened
- 13 April 1931: Closed to passengers
- 1 October 1964: closure to goods
Location
- Location within the former South Lakeland district Location within Cumbria

Middleton-on-Lune railway station was located in Westmorland, England, (now in Cumbria), serving the hamlet and rural locale of Middleton on the Ingleton Branch Line. It was opened as Middleton in 1861 and renamed Middleton-on-Lune on 19 July 1926, closing in 1931.

== History ==
The Lancaster and Carlisle Railway built the Ingleton Branch Line from the existing Ingleton Station to Low Gill. By the time the branch was completed in 1861, the L&CR was operated by the London and North Western Railway (L&NWR).

After formal closure the line was still on occasions used for weekend excursions and to transport pupils to and from local boarding schools. Goods traffic continued until 1 October 1964. The line was maintained as a possible relief route until April 1967 when the tracks were lifted. The main station building survives as a private dwelling.

Preceding station	Disused railways	Following station
Barbon	London and North Western Railway; Ingleton Branch Line	Sedbergh
