= Ingleton railway station =

Ingleton railway station may refer to the following stations in Ingleton, North Yorkshire:

- Ingleton railway station (London and North Western Railway), at the western end of the Ingleton viaduct
- Ingleton railway station (Midland Railway), at the eastern end of the viaduct
