= Barbon railway station =

Former railway station in Westmorland, England

Barbon
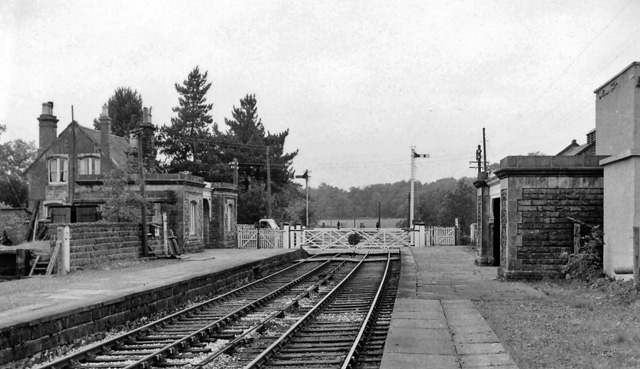
- Barbon railway station

General information
- Location: Barbon, Westmorland and Furness; England
- Coordinates: 54.2362°N 2.5697°W
- Grid reference: SD629824
- Platforms: 2

Other information
- Status: Disused

History
- Original company: Lancaster and Carlisle Railway
- Pre-grouping: London and North Western Railway
- Post-grouping: London, Midland and Scottish Railway

Key dates
- 16 September 1861: Opened
- 1 February 1954: Closed to regular passenger services
- 1 October 1964: Closed completely
Location
- Location within the former South Lakeland district Location within Cumbria

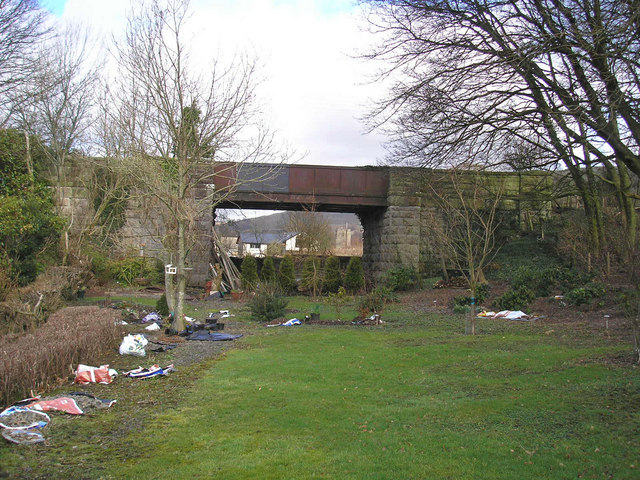
Course of the old railway at Barbon

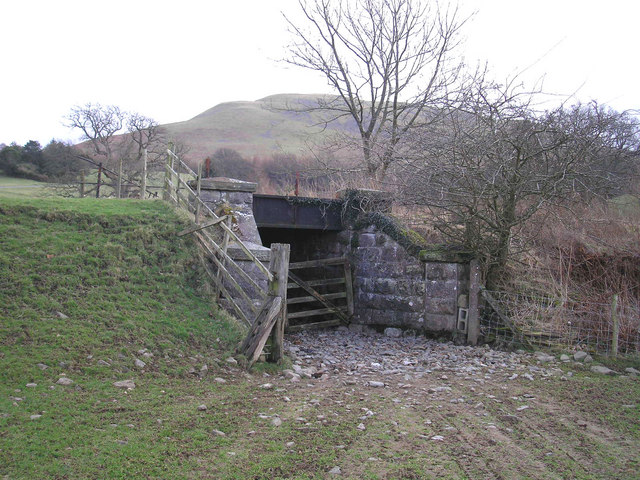
Railway bridge near Barbon

Barbon railway station was located in Westmorland (now part of Cumbria), England, serving the town and locale of Barbon on the Ingleton Branch Line.

== History ==
The Lancaster and Carlisle Railway built the Ingleton Branch Line from the existing Ingleton Station to Low Gill. By the time the branch was completed in 1861, the L&CR was operated by the London and North Western Railway (L&NWR).

After formal closure the line was still on occasions used for weekend excursions and to transport pupils to and from local boarding schools. Goods traffic continued until 1 October 1964. The line was maintained as a possible relief route until April 1967 when the tracks were lifted.

The site is now covered by a housing scheme.

== External sources ==
- Lune Valley Railway

Preceding station	Disused railways	Following station
Kirkby Lonsdale	London and North Western Railway; Ingleton Branch Line	Middleton-on-Lune
