= Kirkby Lonsdale railway station =

Former station in Lancashire, England

Kirkby Lonsdale
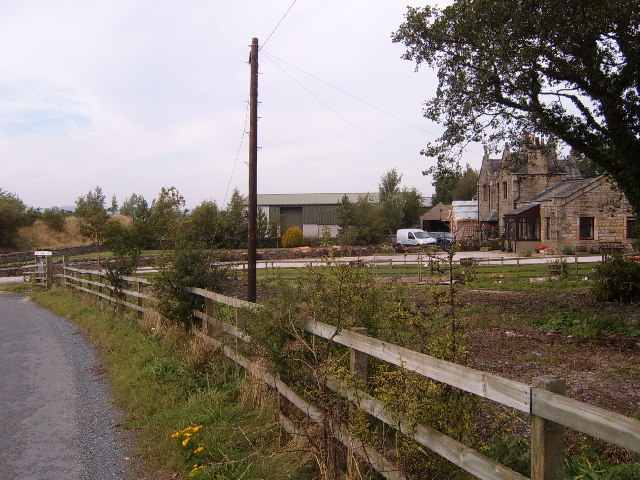
- The remains of Kirkby Lonsdale station

General information
- Location: Kirkby Lonsdale, Lancaster, Lancashire; England
- Coordinates: 54.1910°N 2.5694°W
- Grid reference: SD629774
- Platforms: 2

Other information
- Status: Disused

History
- Original company: Lancaster and Carlisle Railway
- Pre-grouping: London and North Western Railway
- Post-grouping: London, Midland and Scottish Railway

Key dates
- 16 September 1861: Opened
- 1 February 1954: Closed to passengers
- 1 October 1964: Closed to goods
Location
- Location within the City of Lancaster district Location within Lancashire

Kirkby Lonsdale railway station was located in Lancashire, England, on the Ingleton Branch Line, 2 miles (3 km) from the town of Kirkby Lonsdale in Westmorland (now in Cumbria).

== History ==
The Lancaster and Carlisle Railway built the Ingleton Branch Line from the existing Ingleton Station to Low Gill. By the time the branch was completed in 1861, the L&CR was operated by the London and North Western Railway (L&NWR).

After formal closure to passenger on 1 February 1954, the line was still on occasions used for weekend excursions and to transport pupils to and from local boarding schools. Goods traffic continued until 1 October 1964. The line was maintained as a possible relief route until April 1967 when the tracks were lifted. The station had a goods shed, weighing machine and cattle pens. The station building survives as a private dwelling.

Preceding station	Disused railways	Following station
Ingleton (LNWR)	London and North Western Railway; Ingleton Branch Line	Barbon
