= Sedbergh railway station =

Former railway station in Cumbria, England

Sedbergh
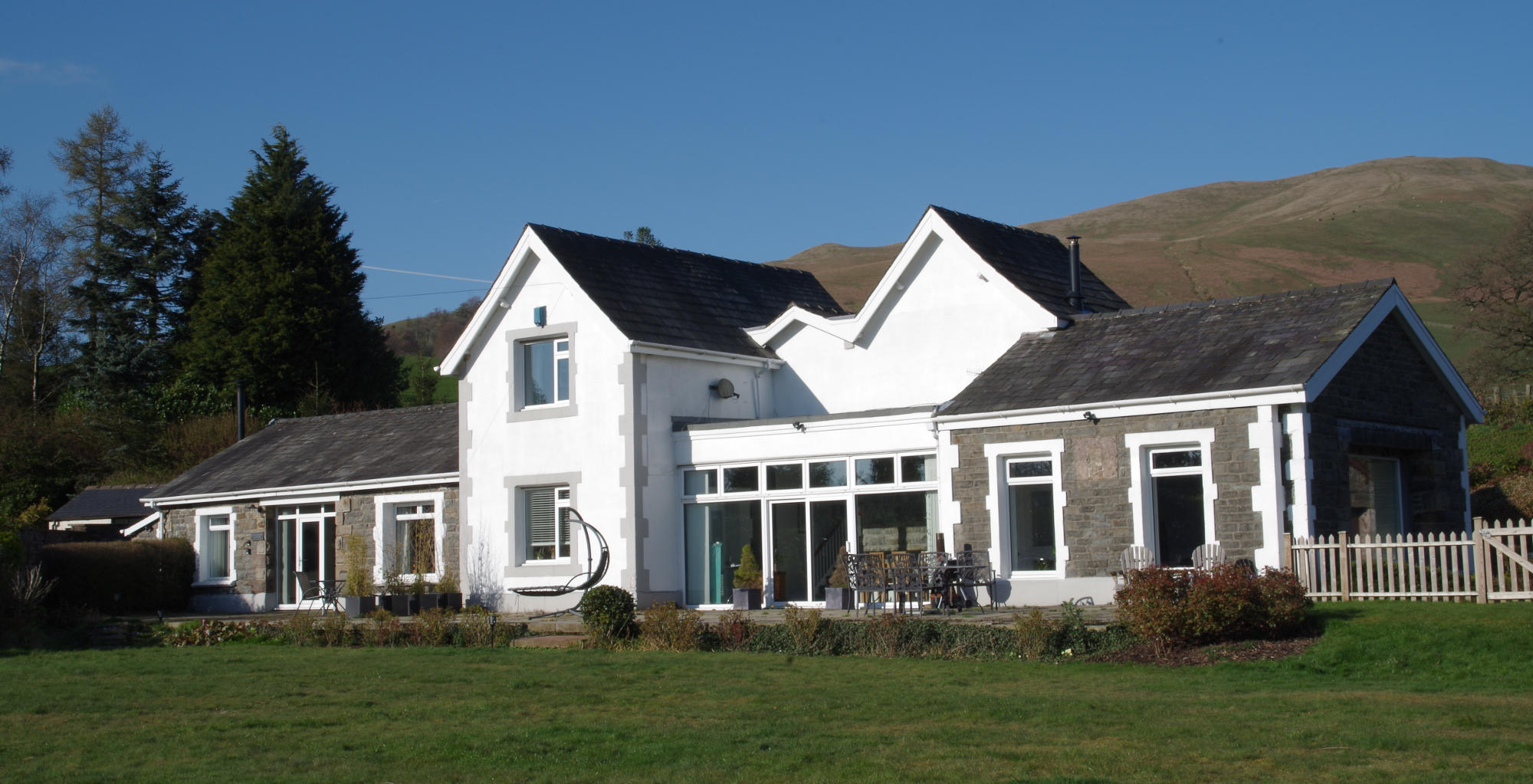
- The former station building in 2019

General information
- Location: Sedbergh, Westmorland and Furness; England
- Coordinates: 54.3220°N 2.5513°W
- Grid reference: SD642919
- Platforms: 2

Other information
- Status: Disused

History
- Original company: Lancaster and Carlisle Railway
- Pre-grouping: London and North Western Railway
- Post-grouping: London, Midland and Scottish Railway

Key dates
- 16 September 1861: Opened
- 1 February 1954: Closed to passengers
- 1 October 1964: Closed to goods
Location
- Location within the former South Lakeland district Location within Cumbria

Sedbergh railway station was in the West Riding of Yorkshire, England, on the Ingleton Branch Line, about half a mile (1 km) west of Sedbergh, open to passengers from 1861 to 1954. Both the town and the station site now lie in Cumbria following boundary changes in 1974.

== History ==
The Lancaster and Carlisle Railway built the Ingleton Branch Line from the existing Ingleton Station to Low Gill. By the time the branch was completed in 1861, the L&CR was operated by the London and North Western Railway (L&NWR).

After formal closure to passenger traffic in February 1954, the line was still on occasions used for weekend excursions and to transport pupils to and from local boarding schools (including one in the town here). Goods traffic continued until 1 October 1964. The line was maintained as a possible relief route until April 1967 when the tracks were lifted.

== Current state ==
The station building is now in private hands and can currently be hired as holiday accommodation.

Part of the site is used as a coal yard and the goods shed remains.

| Preceding station | Disused railways | Following station |
|---|---|---|
| Middleton-on-Lune | London and North Western Railway; Ingleton Branch Line | Low Gill |
