= CPY (disambiguation) =

CPY may refer to:

- Communist Party of Yugoslavia, the founding and ruling party of SFR Yugoslavia
- cpy, the ISO 639-3 code for Ashéninka language
- cycles per year or cpy, a derived unit from the cycle per second
- Clapham railway station, the station code CPY
- CONSPIR4CY, a warez group founded in 1999 in Italy
