= Clapham railway station =

Railway station in North Yorkshire, England

Clapham Clapham (North Yorkshire)
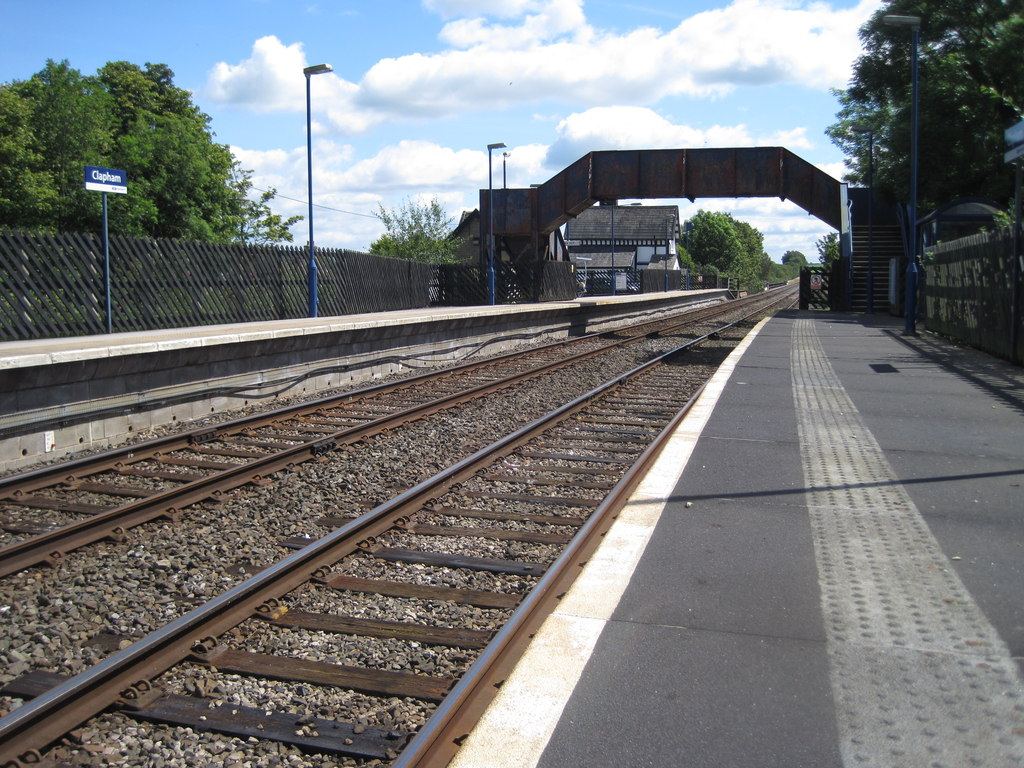

General information
- Location: Clapham, North Yorkshire; England
- Coordinates: 54°06′19″N 2°24′38″W
- Grid reference: SD732678
- Owner: Network Rail
- Manager: Northern Trains
- Platforms: 2
- Tracks: 2

Other information
- Station code: CPY
- Classification: DfT category F2

History
- Original company: "Little" North Western Railway
- Pre-grouping: Midland Railway
- Post-grouping: London Midland and Scottish Railway; British Rail (London Midland Region)

Key dates
- 30 July 1849: Opened

Passengers
- 2021/22: ▲6,158
- 2022/23: ▲9,140
- 2023/24: ▲9,176
- 2024/25: ▲9,690
- 2025/26: ▲10,862
Location
- Location within North Yorkshire
Notes
- Passenger statistics from the Office of Rail and Road

Clapham is a railway station on the Bentham Line, which runs between Leeds and Morecambe via Skipton. The station, situated 48 miles (77 km) north-west of Leeds, serves the village of Clapham in North Yorkshire. It is owned by Network Rail and managed by Northern Trains.

Immediately to the east of the station, the line crosses the River Wenning on a tall, eight-span viaduct.

The station was formerly known in the national timetable as Clapham (Yorkshire), to distinguish it from Clapham (London). The latter was renamed Clapham High Street in 1989.

== History ==
The station was opened by the "little" North Western Railway (NWR) on 30 July 1849 on their line from Skipton to Ingleton and became a junction the following year when the link along the Wenning Valley from Bentham was completed on 1 June 1850 to finish the route from Lancaster to Skipton.

The Ingleton route was subsequently extended northwards, as the Ingleton Branch Line, through Kirkby Lonsdale and Sedbergh to join the West Coast Main Line at Low Gill (near Tebay) by the Lancaster and Carlisle Railway (L&C) in 1861, but disagreements between the L&C's successor, the London and North Western Railway, and the Midland Railway (who had leased the NWR in 1859) over running rights and the subsequent construction of the Settle-Carlisle Line, meant that it never became the major Anglo-Scottish route that the NWR had originally intended.

The Ingleton Branch was closed to passenger traffic on 1 February 1954 and completely in July 1966, although regular goods traffic had ended some months earlier. Lifting of the track followed in April 1967. A sharp curve (with a permanent 35 mph speed restriction) marks the site of the former junction, immediately west of the station.

The station ceased to handle goods traffic in 1968, when the remaining sidings were taken out of use & dismantled and the station signal box closed. It then became an unstaffed halt in October 1970 - the old station house still stands, but is now a private residence.

The proximity of the old station platforms to the Wenning viaduct (and resulting safety concerns due to the steep drop) saw infrastructure operator Railtrack change the layout here in 1998. The eastern platform was refurbished, resurfaced and shortened at its eastern end, whilst a new wooden westbound platform was constructed on the opposite side of the footbridge to its predecessor (which was then demolished) and the bridge steps modified. As a result, the station is similar to neighbouring Giggleswick in having a wooden platform for westbound trains and a stone one for eastbound services.

== Facilities ==
Waiting shelters are present on each platform, along with train information notice boards, but there are no toilets. At present, no ticket machine is available, so tickets can only be purchased on the train or in advance. The footbridge linking the platforms does not have ramps, so the westbound (trains heading towards Lancaster) platform is not accessible for disabled passengers: step-free access is possible on the eastbound (trains heading towards Leeds) side.

Northern Rail have successfully applied for planning permission to install a ticket machine and electronic customer information screens, and also to provide a public toilet on the eastbound platform. The ticket machine and customer information screens were due to be installed in 2019, but as of 2021, only the customer information screens have been installed.

== Services ==
Service improvements were introduced in the May 2019 timetable. There are now eight trains each way Mondays to Saturdays and five trains each way on Sundays. Most trains run between Leeds and Morecambe, but some early morning and evening services terminate at Lancaster. The first Monday to Saturday westbound train starts from Skipton, and the last Monday to Saturday eastbound train terminates there (though a connecting service is available for stations through to Leeds).

There is no longer a through service to Heysham Port - passengers must change at Lancaster for onward connections.

Preceding station	National Rail	Following station
Giggleswick	Northern Trains; Bentham Line	Bentham
	Historical railways	
Giggleswick	Midland Railway "Little" North Western Railway	Bentham High
	Disused railways	
Giggleswick	Midland Railway "Little" North Western Railway	Ingleton (Midland)

== Bibliography ==
- Binns, D (1982) The 'Little' North Western Railway, Wyvern Publishing, Skipton. ISBN 0-907941-01-X
- Marshall, J (1981) Forgotten Railways North-West England, David & Charles (Publishers) Ltd, Newton Abbott. ISBN 0-7153-8003-6
