= Ingleton railway station (Midland Railway) =

Former railway station in Yorkshire, England

Ingleton (Midland)

General information
- Location: Ingleton, North Yorkshire; England
- Coordinates: 54.1523°N 2.4692°W
- Grid reference: SD693730
- Platforms: 2

Other information
- Status: Disused

History
- Original company: "Little" North Western Railway
- Pre-grouping: Midland Railway
- Post-grouping: London, Midland and Scottish Railway

Key dates
- 31 July 1849: Opened
- 1 June 1850: Closed
- 1 October 1861: Reopened
- 30 January 1954: Closed to passengers
- 1965: Closed to goods
Location
- Location within North Yorkshire

Ingleton (Midland) railway station was one of two stations serving the village of Ingleton, North Yorkshire, England. It was originally open for just ten months between 1849 and 1850, and did not reopen until 1861. It then served as the frontier between the Midland Railway to the south and the London and North Western Railway to the North, with trains from each railway terminating at the station. Through trains did not begin until the two companies were merged in 1923. The station closed in 1954. The village's Community Centre is now on the site of the former station.

== History ==
Ingleton station opened on 31 July 1849 as a temporary northern terminus of the "Little" North Western Railway (NWR), who were authorised to build a line from Skipton to Tebay. However, the company ran into financial difficulty and decided to concentrate on the less expensive construction of a branch line to Lancaster, and on completion of that branch, the short section between Clapham and Ingleton was closed only ten months after opening, on 1 June 1850.

A complex sequence of negotiations over the building of a line north of Ingleton followed. A number of railway companies were interested in the line as part of a route from London to Scotland; the London and North Western Railway (LNWR) already had such a route and were opposed to their competitors gaining one. Eventually it was agreed that the Lancaster and Carlisle Railway (L&CR) would build the Ingleton Branch Line from the existing Ingleton Station to Low Gill. By the time the branch was completed in 1861, the L&CR was operated by the LNWR, and the NWR was operated by the rival Midland Railway (MR), and the LNWR did everything in its power to frustrate the MR's ambition of using the new line as a main route to Scotland. Thus the LNWR had its own station at the other end of Ingleton Viaduct. The Ingleton Branch, and the LNWR station, opened on 16 September 1861. The MR reopened the original Ingleton station two weeks later on 1 October 1861, but refused to let LNWR trains use it. Passengers had to walk nearly a mile (1½ km) between the two Ingleton stations, descending into the valley below and climbing up the other side, where they often had a long wait as the companies did not cooperate over timetabling either. By 1862, the MR agreed to allow LNWR trains to terminate at the Midland station, but both Ingleton stations remained open and connections were not timetabled.

The presence of the Midland station played a major role in the success of the Ingleton Waterfalls Trail which opened in 1885 and attracted visitors from Bradford, Manchester and Leeds.

In 1923, the LNWR and MR were merged into the London, Midland and Scottish Railway. The LNWR station closed and, for the first time, passengers could travel through Ingleton without changing trains. The site of the former LNWR station was host to three LMS caravans in 1934 and 1935, four from 1936 to 1938 and finally two caravans in 1939.

On 30 January 1954, the station closed along with all passenger services on the line. The station continued to be used for goods until 1965, and the tracks were lifted in 1967. The station was demolished and the site is now occupied by Ingleton Community Centre and the village's main car park.

=== Stationmasters ===
- Richard Bennett ca. 1860 ca. 1861
- E. Coates until 1872
- M. Congrove 1872 - 1876
- William Briscoe 1876 - 1886
- W.J. Stowell 1886 - 1889
- Richard Collett 1889 - 1907
- W.T. Noble 1907 - ca. 1914

== Ingleton Viaduct ==
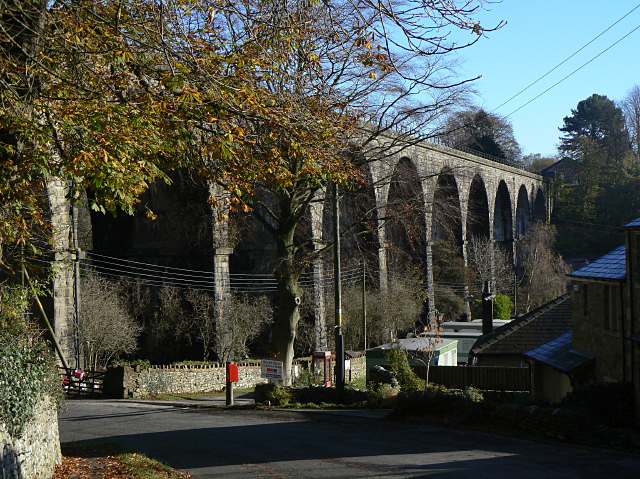
Ingleton Viaduct

A viaduct of 11 arches each 57 feet (17 m) wide, 800 feet (240 m) long with a maximum height of 80 feet (24 m) crosses the valley of the River Greta. The foundations of this had been laid in 1849 by the NWR, but it was left to the L&CR to build it from late 1858 to 18 May 1860. It was built with white sandstone from a Bentham quarry, to designs by the line's engineers, Joseph Locke and John Errington. The two Ingleton stations were at either end of the viaduct.

The viaduct was designated a Grade II listed building on 23 November 1988.

Preceding station	Disused railways	Following station
Clapham	Midland Railway "Little" North Western Railway	Terminus
Terminus	London and North Western Railway; Ingleton Branch Line	Ingleton (L&NW)
