= Ingleton railway station (London and North Western Railway) =

Former railway station in Yorkshire, England

Ingleton (L&NW)

General information
- Location: Ingleton, North Yorkshire; England
- Coordinates: 54.1547°N 2.4751°W
- Grid reference: SD689733
- Platforms: 2

Other information
- Status: Disused

History
- Original company: Lancaster and Carlisle Railway
- Pre-grouping: London and North Western Railway

Key dates
- 16 September 1861: Opened
- 1 January 1917: Closed
Location
- Location within North Yorkshire

Ingleton (L&NW) railway station (also known as Ingleton Thornton station) was one of two stations serving the village of Ingleton, North Yorkshire, England. It owed its existence to the intense rivalry between the two stations' owners. It opened, along with the Ingleton Branch Line, in 1861, and closed in 1917, by which time the two railway companies had become more cooperative.

== History ==
The "Little" North Western Railway's Ingleton station was originally opened in 1849 as a temporary terminus, but closed only ten months later as the company could not afford to continue the line beyond Ingleton.

Eventually it was the Lancaster and Carlisle Railway (L&CR) that built the Ingleton Branch Line from the existing Ingleton Station to Low Gill. By the time the branch was completed in 1861, the L&CR was operated by the London and North Western Railway (L&NWR), and the NWR was operated by the rival Midland Railway (MR), and the L&NWR did everything in its power to frustrate the MR's ambition of using the new line as a main route to Scotland. Thus the L&NWR built Ingleton (L&NW) station at the other end of Ingleton Viaduct. The Ingleton Branch, and the L&NW station, opened on 16 September 1861. The MR reopened the original Ingleton station two weeks later but refused to let L&NW trains use it. Passengers had to walk a distance of almost 1 mile (1.6 km) between the two Ingleton stations, descending into the valley below and climbing up the other side, where they often had a long wait as the companies did not cooperate over timetabling either. By 1862, the MR agreed to allow L&NW trains to terminate at the Midland station, but both Ingleton stations remained open and connections were not timetabled.

On the positive side, the presence of two stations allowed people to pay a penny fare to cross the viaduct between the two stations simply to enjoy the view.

On 13 March 1893, a 1-mile (2 km) mineral line was opened from the L&NW station to Meal Bank Quarry. It passed over a high embankment and bridge across the entrance to the Ingleton Waterfalls Trail. The embankment survives to this day. The quarry and its line closed in 1909.

The L&NW station closed on 1 January 1917. The other station survived until the line's closure in 1954. The L&NW station was demolished and the site is now used by a fuel supplier.

Preceding station	Disused railways	Following station
Ingleton (Midland)	London and North Western Railway; Ingleton Branch Line	Kirkby Lonsdale
