= Listed buildings in Barbon =

Barbon is a civil parish in Westmorland and Furness, Cumbria, England. It contains 23 listed buildings that are recorded in the National Heritage List for England. Of these, two are listed at Grade II*, the middle of the three grades, and the others are at Grade II, the lowest grade. The parish contains the village of Barbon and the surrounding countryside. The listed buildings consist of houses, farmhouses and farm buildings, bridges, a milestone, a boundary stone, and a church.

== Key ==
Grade	Criteria
II*	Particularly important buildings of more than special interest
II	Buildings of national importance and special interest

== Buildings ==
Name and location	Photograph	Date	Notes	Grade
High Bank House; 54.23425°N 2.56198°W	—	Late 17th or 18th century	A house, later divided into two dwellings, in stone with a roof partly of slate and partly of stone-slate. There are two storeys and five bays. Most of the windows are sashes, and there is one casement window. The central doorway has moulded jambs, an ogee lintel, and an open gabled porch with a segmental arch. At the rear are two gabled bays.	II
High Beckfoot Bridge; 54.23065°N 2.59372°W	—	Late 17th or 18th century (probable)	A packhorse bridge crossing Barbon Beck, it is in stone and consists of a single shallow segmental arch. It has a plain coped parapet, and the roadway is about 1 metre (3 ft 3 in) wide.	II
Beckgate Bridge; 54.23850°N 2.57272°W		18th century (probable)	The bridge carries a road, Beckgate, over Barbon Beck. It is in stone, and consists of a single segmental arch with thin voussoirs, and is higher to the north. It has plain parapets, and the roadway is about 3.5 metres (11 ft) wide.	II
Beckgate Head, barn and Gatesgarth; 54.23717°N 2.57224°W	—	18th century (probable)	Two houses and a barn, in stone with slate roofs and two storeys. Beckgate Head has three bays, a gabled porch, and sash windows. The barn to the left has quoins, a segmental-headed entrance and two smaller entrances. Gatesgarth is at right angles and has four irregular bays, a gabled porch with a segmental openings and stone benches, and sash windows.	II
Dunroamin and Boxtree Cottage; 54.23788°N 2.57626°W	—	Mid 18th century (probable)	A pair of houses in roughcast stone with slate roofs, two storeys and six bays, the right two bays being lower. Most of the ground floor windows are casements, and the others are modern replacements. There are two gabled porches containing side benches, and one plain doorway. At the rear is an outshut.	II
Hodge Bridge; 54.23722°N 2.58046°W		18th century (probable)	The bridge carries the A693 road over Barbon Beck. It is in stone, and consists of a slightly pointed segmental arch with thin voussoirs. The bridge has low parapets with reeded coping and iron railings. The bridge is also a scheduled monument.	II
Stocks Garth and barn 54.23650°N 2.57150°W	—	Mid 18th century	The house and barn are in roughcast stone with a slate roof. The house has two storeys and two bays, and the windows are mullioned. The barn to the left has a segmental-headed entrance and a smaller entrance. At the rear are two gabled wings and an outshut, casement windows, and a plain doorway.	II
Low Bank House and barn 54.23043°N 2.56804°W	—	1758	The farmhouse has two storeys and three bays, and a later wing with quoins at the rear. On the front is a gabled porch and an initialled datestone. There is one casement window, and the other windows are sashes. The barn to the south has doorways, ventilation slits and a ball finial. Over the ground floor of the house and barn is a hood mould.	II
Milestone; 54.22926°N 2.58215°W		1763	The milestone was provided for the Sedbergh to Greta Bridge turnpike. It consists of a stone with a circular plan on a square base with broaches, and is inscribed with initials and numbers.	II
Beckside House; 54.23878°N 2.57377°W	—	1767	A stone house on a plinth, partly rendered, with quoins, a band, a modillioned cornice and parapet, and a slate roof with coped gables. There are two storeys with attics, and three bays. The doorway has an egg and dart moulded architrave, a foliate frieze, and a modillioned pediment containing a relief mask. The windows are sashes in stone surrounds, and the window above the door has a dated and initialled lintel. In the attic are two flat-topped dormers, and at the rear is a tall stair window.	II*
Underley Grange; 54.22326°N 2.58537°W	—	Late 18th century	A house in limestone, on a plinth, with sandstone dressings, quoins, a band, a moulded gutter, and a slate roof. There are two storeys and three bays, the central bay projecting forward under a pediment. Above the central doorway is a fanlight and a pediment, and the windows are sashes. At the rear are an outshut range and two gabled ranges. Attached at the left is a rusticated gate pier with a ball finial, and a gate.	II
Barn, Underley Grange; 54.22412°N 2.58519°W	—	1770	A stone barn with quoins and a slate roof. On the west front is a segmental-headed barn entrance, and mullioned windows in chamfered surrounds. In the north gable end is a pitching hole, and on the east side is a continuous outshut.	II
Outbuilding (south), Underley Grange; 54.22301°N 2.58552°W	—	Late 18th to early 19th century	The outbuilding is in stone and has a roof with coped gables. The north front has two storeys and three bays, and it contains openings with stone surrounds, the central one in the upper floor having a round head. In the east gable end is a pitching hole. At the left end is a wall that has a rusticated gate pier with a ball finial, and a gate.	II
Boundary Stone; 54.25763°N 2.51011°W		Early 19th century (probable)	The stone marks the boundary between the parishes of Barbon and Dent. It consists of a round-headed post inscribed with the names of the parishes.	II
Outbuilding (west), Underley Grange; 54.22335°N 2.58607°W	—	Early to mid 19th century (probable)	The outbuilding is in stone with quoins, a slate roof, a single storey, and two bays. There is a central doorway and the windows are casements with two round-headed lights and decorative glazing.	II
Whelprigg; 54.22596°N 2.56366°W		1834	A country house by George Webster in Jacobean style. It was extended to the north in about 1910. The house is in stone with rusticated quoins, a cornice, and slate roofs. The south front has two storeys with attics and five bays, the outer bays projecting, and there is a north wing with two storeys and three bays. There are three coped gables with corbelled parapets and ball finials. In the outer bays are two-storey canted bay windows; most of the other windows are mullioned and transomed, those in the gables being stepped. Above the entrance is a re-used datestone.	II
Stables, house and wall, Whelprigg; 54.22640°N 2.56248°W	—	1845	The buildings are in stone with slate roofs, and form a U-shaped plan. The house forms the east range, it has seven bays and coped gables with ball finials. On the front is a timber porch, and the windows are sashes. The north and west ranges contain the stables, and have various openings, some blocked. The wall surrounds the garden to the west, it has a canted southwest angle, and an entrance on the west side with a wrought iron gate.	II
Blindbeck Bridge; 54.23812°N 2.53018°W		19th century (probable)	The bridge carries a road over a stream. It is in stone, and consists of a single segmental arch with voussoirs and a plain parapet.	II
Barbon Manor; 54.23986°N 2.55478°W	—	1862–63	A country house designed by E. M. Barry for James Kay-Shuttleworth in French Renaissance style. It is in limestone with sandstone dressings and has a mansard slate roof. The south front has two storeys, a basement and attics, and four bays, the east bay being semicircular. The basement is rusticated, on the upper floor are cast iron balconies, and in the attics are dormer windows. The north front has three bays, and it contains an inscribed cornice, a doorway with a fanlight, a keystone, a cornice, and a balustrade with an armorial bearing and ball finials.	II
Underley Bridge; 54.22058°N 2.60094°W		1872–75	The bridge carries a roadway over the River Lune. It is in stone, and consists of two equal segmental arches and a smaller segmental arch to the north. The pier between the equal arches has triangular cutwaters that rise to form pedestrian refuges. The parapets are embattled, those on the main arches being corbelled. On the smaller arch are panels with armorial bearings.	II
Bridge, Low Beckfoot; 54.22574°N 2.59371°W		c. 1870	An accommodation bridge crossing an estate road, it is in stone with sandstone dressings. The bridge consists of a single round arch with rusticated voussoirs, a band, and a keystone. The parapets continue as walls, and curve to end piers.	II
Kennels, Barbon Manor; 54.23921°N 2.55765°W	—	Late 19th century	An estate house in stone with quoins and a mansard slate roof, built on sloping ground. The south front has two storeys, the north front has one storey, and there are six bays. The windows are sashes with mullions in plain surrounds, and there are four hipped dormers. Above the doorways are fanlights.	II
St Bartholomew's Church; 54.23656°N 2.56837°W		1892–93	The church, designed by Paley, Austin and Paley in free Perpendicular style, is in stone, and has stone-slate roof with coped gables. It consists of a nave, aisles, a south porch, a tower at the crossing, a south transept, a north organ loft and vestry, and a chancel. The tower has a southeast stair turret, a clock face on the west side, an embattled parapet, and a pyramidal roof with a cross.	II*
