= Catherine Grace Godwin =

Scottish poet and painter (1798–1845)

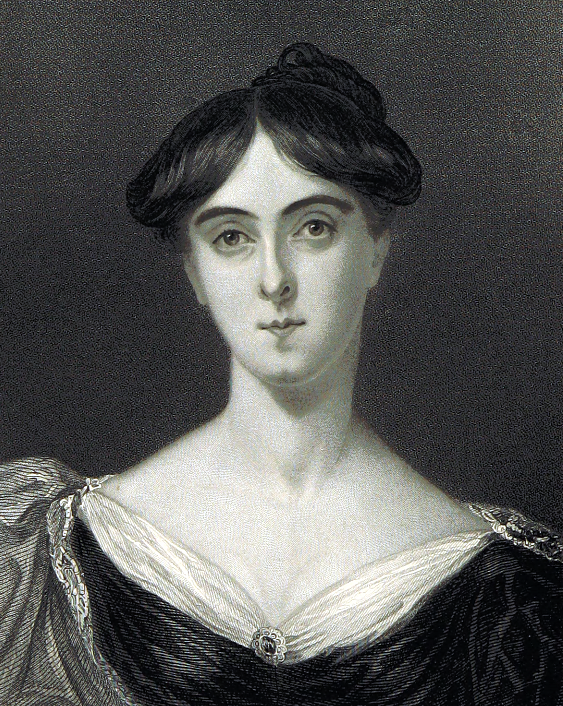
- Self portrait
- Born: Catherine Grace Garnett; 25 December 1798; Glasgow
- Died: May 1, 1845 (aged 46); Barbon
- Known for: Poetry
- Spouse: Thomas Godwin

Catherine Grace Godwin (25 December 1798 – 1845) was a Scottish novelist, amateur painter and poet.

== Biography ==
Catherine Grace Garnett was born in Glasgow on 25 December 1798. Her mother, Catherine Grace Cleveland, died in childbirth. Her father, Dr. Thomas Garnett, devastated by the loss of his wife died in 1802. Godwin and her elder sister were brought up by a friend of their mother, Mary Worboys, in the village of Barbon near Kirkby Lonsdale in Westmorland.

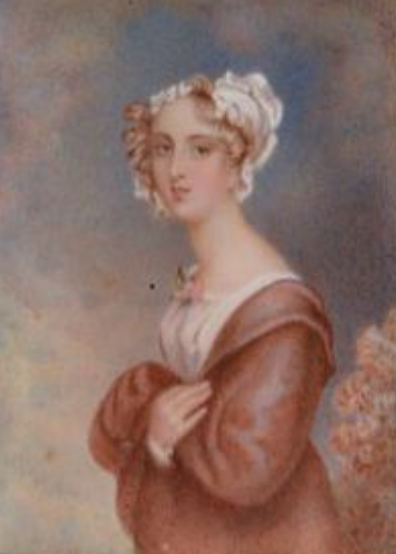
Girl in a white and red dress by Catherine Grace Godwin

She began painting and writing poetry in earnest when she was fifteen but she did not publish any work until 1824. The book allowed her to become a correspondent and eventually meet William Wordsworth.

She published a romance titled Reine Canziani but she did not use her name on the cover. She did publish her best known work The Wanderer's Legacy and other poems in 1828 which she dedicated to Wordsworth.

Godwin published The Night before the Bridal and other poems before she married Thomas Godwin who had worked for the East India Company. She followed this with another book of poetry and she died in May 1845 in Barbon.

In 1854, A. Cleveland Wigan gathered together her poems and had them published with her self-portrait.

== Selected works ==
- Alicia Grey, Or, to Be Useful Is to Be Happy
- Reine Canziani
- Josephine, Or, Early Trials
- The Wanderer's Legacy: a Collection of Poems, on Various Subjects
- Louisa Seymour, or, Hasty Impressions
- The Reproving Angel: A Vision
- Esther More, or, Truth is Wisdom
- Basil Harlow, or Prodigality is not Generosity
- Cousin Kate, or the Punishment of Pride
- Scheming, A Tale
