= Giggleswick railway station =

Railway station in North Yorkshire, England

Giggleswick
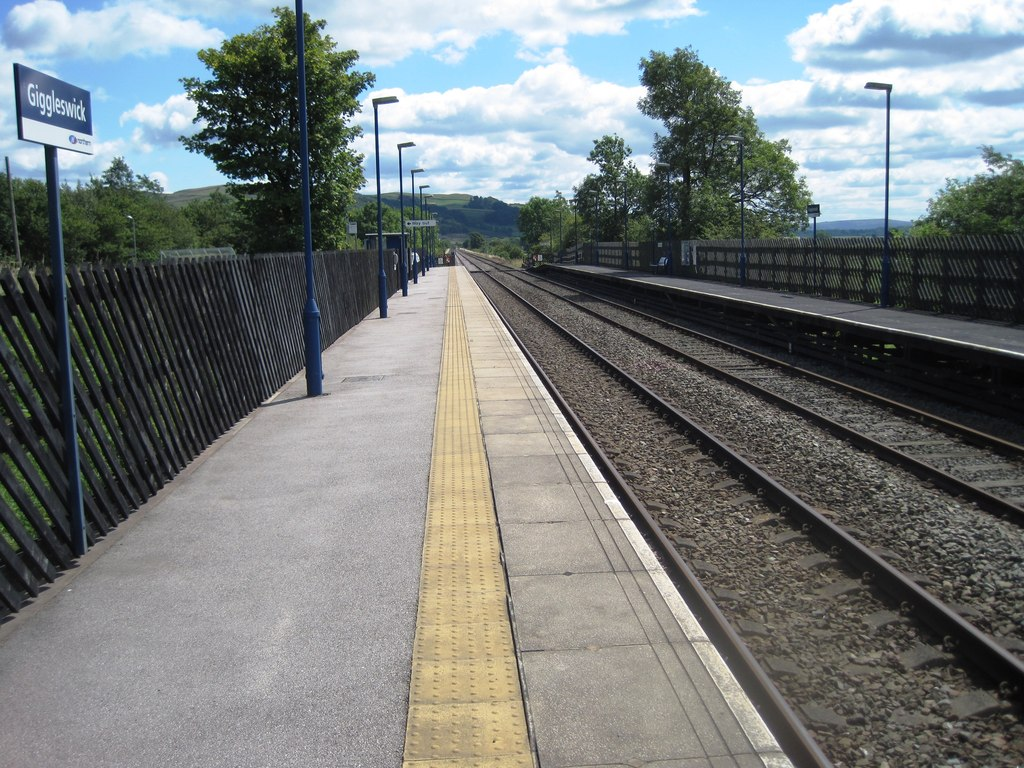

General information
- Location: Giggleswick, North Yorkshire; England
- Coordinates: 54°03′42″N 2°18′10″W
- Grid reference: SD802629
- Owner: Network Rail
- Manager: Northern Trains
- Platforms: 2
- Tracks: 2

Other information
- Station code: GIG
- Classification: DfT category F2

History
- Original company: "Little" North Western Railway
- Pre-grouping: Midland Railway
- Post-grouping: London, Midland and Scottish Railway; British Rail (London Midland Region)

Key dates
- 1 August 1849: Opened as Settle
- 1 May 1876: Renamed Settle Old
- 1 November 1877: Renamed Giggleswick

Passengers
- 2021/22: ▲9,640
- 2022/23: ▲13,842
- 2023/24: ▲14,078
- 2024/25: ▲15,486
- 2025/26: ▲17,560
Location
- Location within North Yorkshire
Notes
- Passenger statistics from the Office of Rail and Road

Giggleswick is a railway station on the Bentham Line, which runs between Leeds and Morecambe via Skipton. The station, situated 41 1/4 miles (66 km) north-west of Leeds, serves the market town of Settle and the village of Giggleswick in North Yorkshire. It is owned by Network Rail and managed by Northern Trains.

== History ==
Opened by the "Little" North Western Railway in 1849, the station was originally known as "Settle", as it was the first station to serve the town, although situated some distance west of its centre. When the Settle and Carlisle Railway opened on 1 May 1876, the name was changed to "Settle Old" to distinguish it from Settle New on the line a mile to the east; Settle Old became "Giggleswick" on 1 November 1877.

The station did have more substantial buildings in the past, along with a goods yard, water tower and signal box. These were all demolished/removed after the station closed to goods traffic and was downgraded to unstaffed halt status in 1970.

== Facilities ==
The only buildings now provided here are standard waiting shelters - a new bespoke one was opened on the westbound platform in November 2016. The two platforms are of differing construction - the westbound is wooden, whilst the eastbound equivalent is stone/concrete. They are linked by a barrow crossing, so the station is fully step free (though the National Rail Enquiries service and Northern recommend that disabled passengers only use this with assistance). Train running information provision is provided by posters, new information displays and a telephone link to the signal box at Settle Junction. Tickets can only be bought on the train, as no ticketing facilities are available here.

== Service ==
On Monday to Saturdays, five trains a day ran from Giggleswick southbound to Skipton and Leeds and westbound to Lancaster. All but the first westbound service of the day continued to Morecambe and there used to be a single through train to and from Heysham Port to connect with the sailing to the Isle of Man.

Four trains ran each way on Sundays throughout the year since the May 2011 timetable change (an improvement on the former twice-daily winter frequency).

From the start of the May 2018 summer timetable, additional services have been introduced. Eight trains each way now run to Lancaster and Skipton, with five of the former continuing to Morecambe and seven of the latter to Leeds (though the direct train to and from Heysham has ceased on weekdays and Saturdays). One additional train each way runs on Sundays. One additional train each way was introduced from 20 May 2019 on weekdays and Saturdays, with two additional trains running to and from Morecambe. The winter 2019 timetable update has seen all five departures extended from Lancaster through to Morecambe, with one running right through to/from Heysham. This service level remains in place as of the summer 2025 timetable, though there are no longer through services to Heysham.

Preceding station	National Rail	Following station
Long Preston	Northern Trains; Bentham Line	Clapham (North Yorkshire)
	Historical railways	
Settle Junction	Midland Railway "Little" North Western Railway	Clapham (North Yorkshire)
