= Thomas Garnett (physician) =

British doctor

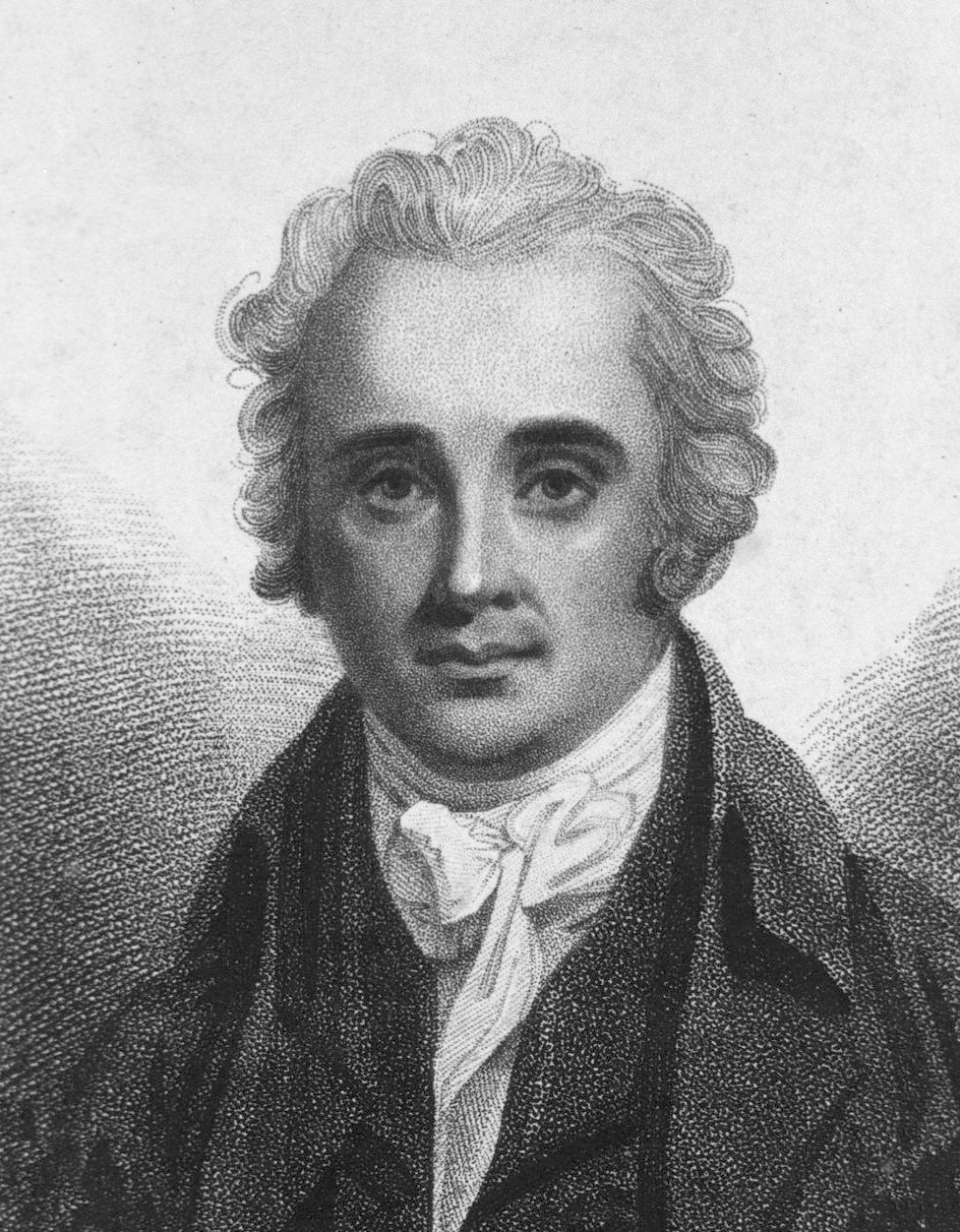
Thomas Garnett

Thomas Garnett (21 April 1766 – 28 June 1802) was an English physician and natural philosopher.

== Life ==
Garnett was born on 21 April 1766 at Casterton in Westmoreland, where his father had a small landed property. After attending Sedbergh School, he was at fifteen articled at his own request to John Dawson (surgeon) of Sedbergh, Yorkshire, who was a surgeon and mathematician. Garnett obtained a knowledge of chemistry and physics, and he matriculated at the University of Edinburgh in 1785 with "exceptional scientific knowledge". He was particularly zealous in his attendance on the lectures of Dr. Black and of Dr. John Brown, and he became a disciple of the Brunonian theory. "He avoided," says his anonymous biographer, "almost all society, and it is said he never allowed himself at this period more than four hours sleep per day. He graduated in 1788, completed his medical education in London, and, returning for a short time to his parents and wrote his treatise on optics for the Encyclopædia Britannica. In 1790 he practiced in Bradford and in the following year in Knaresborough and Harrogate. He published the first scientific analysis of the Harrogate waters and several schemes for the benefit of the inhabitants of Knaresborough".

Lord Rosslyn built him a house at Harrogate, but his success did not answer his expectations, and he was meditating emigration to America when he succumbed to the attractions of Catharine Grace Cleveland, whom he had received as a boarder into his house. They were married in March 1795, and as he was in Liverpool endeavouring to arrange for a passage to America a casual invitation to deliver lectures on natural philosophy changed the current of his life. The success of the course, which was repeated at Manchester and other places, brought him an invitation to become professor at Anderson's Institution at Glasgow. During this period, in October 1796 he also lectured at the Masonic Lodge in Warrington, Cheshire; though not being a member, he was accepted as such so is supposed to have become a Freemason while in Scotland. He obtained great success at Glasgow, both as lecturer and physician, and in 1798 undertook the tour in the highlands of which his account was published in 1800. It is too diffuse, but was a valuable work in its day, and is interesting even now as an index to subsequent changes.. He founded Garnethill Observatory in 1810 in Glasgow's Blythswood Hill district, on land named after him by developer William Harley.

On 25 Dec. 1798 his wife died giving birth to his daughter, Catherine Grace, and he never recovered from this. His depression prevented him from carrying out the important post of professor of natural philosophy and chemistry at the Royal Institution, to which he was appointed in October 1799. It is further hinted that he incurred the dislike of Benjamin Thompson, Count Rumford, the presiding genius of the institution. It is unnecessary, however, to seek any other cause than the inadequacy of his lectures to the demands of a popular assemblage. Those, at least, which were published after his death under the title of Zoonomia, or the Laws of Animal Life (1804), though full of knowledge and exceedingly clear in style, are too technical for a popular audience. His north-country accent was against him, and ill-health rendered his delivery inanimate. After lecturing for two seasons he resigned, and commenced medical practice in London. He was beginning to meet with success when he died, 28 June 1802, of typhus fever contracted at the Marylebone Dispensary where he worked. A subscription was raised, and his Royal Institution lectures were published for the benefit of his two infant daughters, one of whom was to be the poet Mrs. Catherine Grace Godwin.

Garnett was buried in St James's Burial Ground, Euston, London (later St James's Gardens, adjacent to Euston Station). His gravestone and coffin plate were recovered during an archaeological excavation at the former 18th and 19th century burial ground, in the preparatory phases of work for the new HS2 rail line. The burial ground was used by the parish of St James's Piccadilly, off the Hampstead Road.

Garnett was a most amiable man, who fell a victim to the susceptibility of his character and the strength of his affections. Diffident of his own powers, he was enthusiastic for the discoveries and ideas of others. He had not the genius of discovery himself, but was observant and sagacious. A passage in his Highland Tour (i. 89) anticipates the modern theory of a quasi-intelligence in plants.
