= Barbon =

Coordinates: 54.217°N 2.567°W

- Village and parish
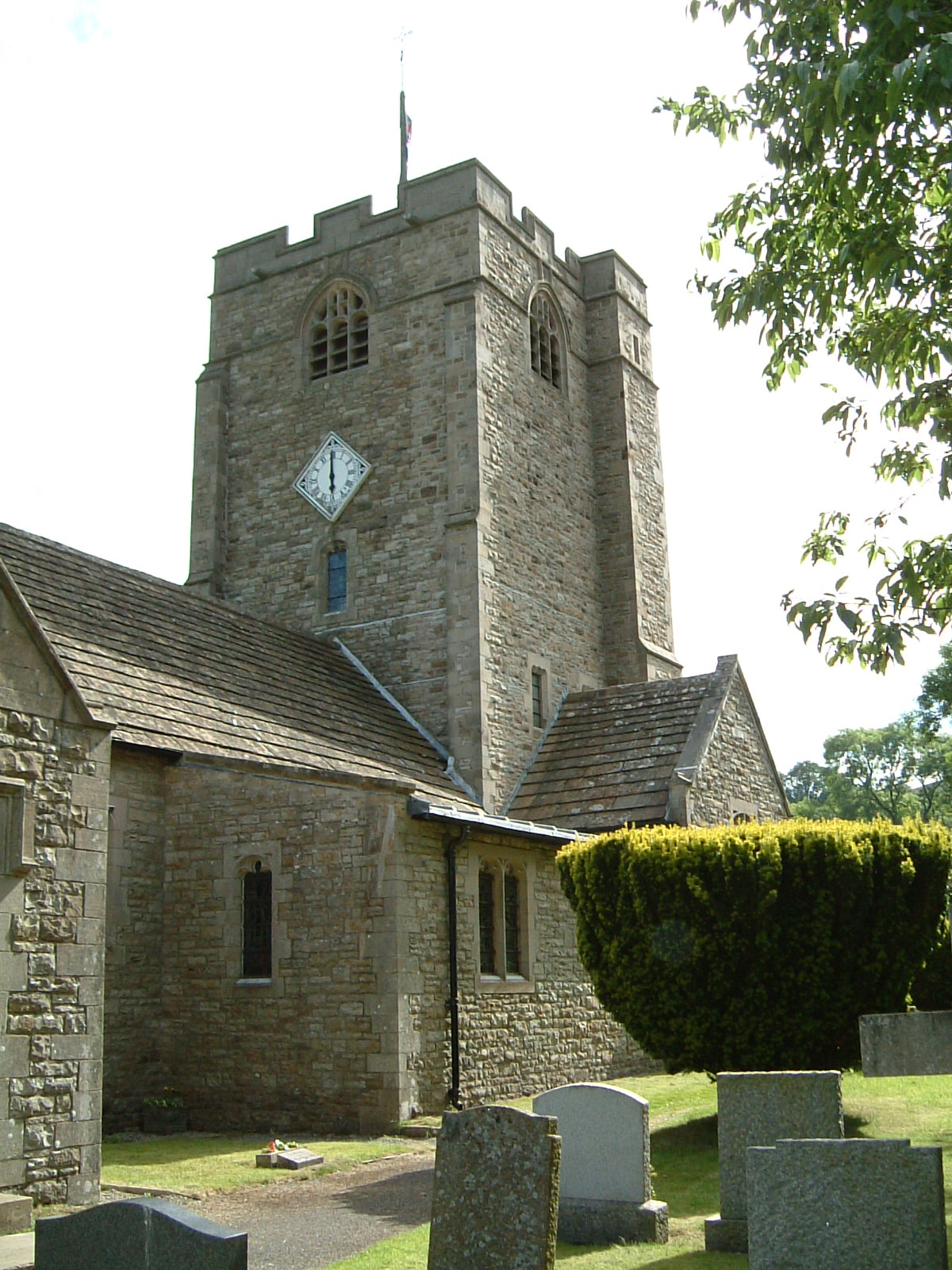
- St Bartholomew's Church

- Location in the former South Lakeland district Location within Cumbria
- Population: 236 (2011)
- OS grid reference: SD6282
- Civil parish: Barbon
- Unitary authority: Westmorland and Furness
- Ceremonial county: Cumbria
- Region: North West
- Country: England
- Sovereign state: United Kingdom
- Post town: CARNFORTH
- Postcode district: LA6
- Dialling code: 015242
- Police: Cumbria
- Fire: Cumbria
- Ambulance: North West
- UK Parliament: Morecambe and Lunesdale

Barbon is a village and civil parish in Cumbria, England. According to the 2001 census it had a population of 263, which decreased to 236 according to the 2011 Census. The church is dedicated to St Bartholomew. The village is about 3 miles (4.8 km) north of Kirkby Lonsdale and 2 miles (3.2 km) north of Casterton. Barbon Beck flows through, and takes its name from the village before flowing into the River Lune. The A683 road passes to the west of the village between Kirkby Lonsdale and Sedbergh. The village has been within the Yorkshire Dales National Park since 1 August 2016.

== Description ==
The village was the childhood home of the poet Catherine Grace Godwin who died here in 1845.

The Barbon Inn, in the centre of the village, is a hotel, pub and restaurant built as a coaching inn in the 17th century.

Barbon Manor was built as a shooting lodge for Sir James Kay-Shuttleworth, (the Shuttleworth family had been lords of the manor at Barbon since the 16th century). His grandson Edward James Kay-Shuttleworth (1890-1917) is buried at Barbon. Edward's wife, Sibell Eleanor Maud née Adeane, later married Roger Fulford and they lived together at Barbon Manor.

The Barbon Manor Speed Hillclimb is an event that takes place on three occasions each year, in May, June and July, on a driveway that runs through Barbon Manor Park, by permission of the Shuttleworth Estate.

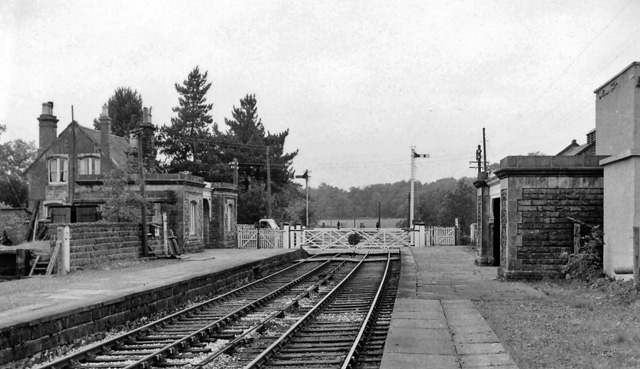
Until 1954 Barbon had a railway station seen here in 1962

== Other sources ==
A family history study, written in 1913, says, "The Hardys of Barbon, and some other Westmoreland Statesmen : Their Kith, Kin and Childer" followed their family history in Barbon from the 16th century until the late 19th century.

== See also ==
- Listed buildings in Barbon
