= St Bartholomew's Church, Barbon =

Coordinates: 54.2365°N 2.5684°W

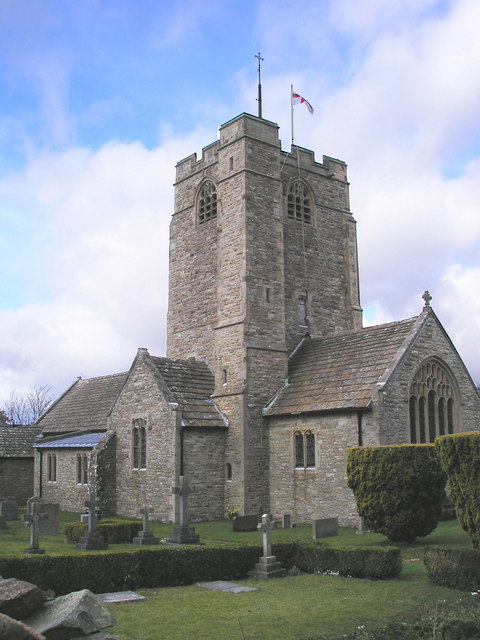
- St Bartholomew's Church, Barbon, from the southeast

- Location in Cumbria
- OS grid reference: SD 631,825
- Location: Barbon, Cumbria
- Country: England
- Denomination: Anglican
- Website: St Bartholomew, Barbon

History
- Status: Parish church
- Dedication: Saint Bartholomew

Architecture
- Functional status: Active
- Heritage designation: Grade II*
- Designated: 21 February 1989
- Architect: Paley, Austin and Paley
- Architectural type: Church
- Style: Gothic Revival
- Groundbreaking: 1892
- Completed: 1893

Specifications
- Materials: Stone

Administration
- Province: York
- Diocese: Carlisle
- Archdeaconry: Westmorland and Furness
- Deanery: Kendal
- Parish: Kirkby Lonsdale

Clergy
- Rector: Revd Richard John Snow

St Bartholomew's Church is in the village of Barbon, Cumbria, England. It is an active Anglican parish church in the deanery of Kendal, the archdeaconry of Westmorland and Furness, and the diocese of Carlisle. Its benefice is united with those of St Mary the Virgin, Kirkby Lonsdale, Holy Trinity, Casterton, St John the Divine, Hutton Roof, All Saints, Lupton, St Peter, Mansergh, and the Holy Ghost, Middleton, to form the Kirkby Lonsdale Team Ministry. The church is recorded in the National Heritage List for England as a designated Grade II* listed building.

== History ==
The present church stands slightly to the south of a former chapel of ease that was in existence by 1610. This was rebuilt in 1815, but all that remains of it is a porch to the north of the present church, which is used as a shed. St Bartholomew's was built in 1892–93, and designed by the Lancaster firm of architects, Paley, Austin and Paley. The church cost £3,000 (equivalent to £440,000 in 2025).

== Architecture ==
=== Exterior ===
The church is constructed in stone, with stone-slate roofs. Its plan consists of a four-bay nave, two-bay north and south aisles, a south porch, a south transept, a north organ loft and vestry, and a chancel. A tower stands on the crossing. The architectural style of the church is Perpendicular, freely expressed. The aisle windows have two or three lights, The window in the transept has two lights, and that in the organ loft has three lights. There is a three-light west window, and in the chancel is a five-light east window, and a two-light window on the south side. The south porch is gabled with a three-centred arch, above which is a niche containing a statue. On the southeast corner of the tower is a square stair turret. On the west side of the tower is a single-light window, with a clock face above it. The three-light bell openings are louvred. The parapet is embattled, and on top of the tower is a pyramidal roof surmounted by a tall cross.

=== Interior ===
The interior of the church is faced with ashlar stone. The two-bay arcades are carried on octagonal piers. Most of the furniture and fittings were designed by the architects, and carved by local craftsmen. In the church are Royal arms of 1815. The stained glass in the west window was made in 1893 by Powell's to a design by Harrington Mann. The glass elsewhere is by Shrigley and Hunt. The two-manual organ was made in 1903 by J. W. Walker. There is a ring of six bells. Five of these were cast by John Taylor of Loughborough, three of them in 1893, one in 1897, and one in 1964. The sixth bell was cast in 2003 by Eijsbouts.

== See also ==
- Listed buildings in Barbon
- List of works by Paley, Austin and Paley
