= Listed buildings in Middleton, Cumbria =

Middleton is a civil parish in Westmorland and Furness, Cumbria, England. It contains 22 listed buildings that are recorded in the National Heritage List for England. Of these, five are listed at Grade II*, the middle of the three grades, and the others are at Grade II, the lowest grade. The parish contains the village of Middleton, and is otherwise rural. Most of the listed buildings are houses and associated structures, farmhouses and farm buildings. The other listed buildings include milestones, one of which dates back to the Roman era, a church and items in the churchyard, and bridges.

== Key ==
Grade	Criteria
II*	Particularly important buildings of more than special interest
II	Buildings of national importance and special interest

== Buildings ==
Name and location	Photograph	Date	Notes	Grade
Roman milestone 54.26719°N 2.58083°W		3rd or 4th century	The milestone, dating from the Roman era, consists of a cylindrical shaft, with an original inscription, the symbols indicating 53 miles. There is also a later added Latin inscription. The milestone is also a scheduled monument.	II*
Middleton Hall; 54.28119°N 2.57449°W		Late 14th century (probable)	Originally an H-shaped hall house, now without its north wing, and with later alterations and extensions. It is in stone, partly roughcast, with a roof of slate and stone-slate. The west front has three bays, the third bay projecting under a gable, and the windows are mullioned. The doorway has a moulded surround, a hood mould and an escutcheon. The hall and associated structures are a scheduled monument.	II*
Outbuilding and wall, Middleton Hall; 54.28136°N 2.57444°W	—	Early to mid 15th century	Originally an extension to the north wing of the hall, and later a separate outbuilding, it is in stone with quoins, a stone-slate roof, and two storeys. In the south front is a large pointed entrance, now blocked with an inserted window, and a pitching hole above. There is another pitching hole in the north side, and in the east gable end is a round-headed window. Attached to the east end is a short length of wall that includes a small recess for a well.	II*
Curtain wall to southwest, Middleton Hall; 54.28114°N 2.57467°W	—	Mid 15th century	This part of the curtain wall is about 7 metres (23 ft) long. Much of it is reduced in height, but some corbelling to the parapet remains. There is a later lean-to privy on the south side. The building is also a scheduled monument.	II*
Curtain wall to west and barn, Middleton Hall; 54.28138°N 2.57479°W	—	Mid 15th century	The curtain wall runs to the west and the northwest of the hall, and contains various entrances. The barn dates from the 16th century and was extended in about 1850. It is in stone with a stone-slate roof, and contains a barn entrance with a segmental head, mullioned windows and other openings. The building is also a scheduled monument.	II*
Hawkin Hall; 54.26575°N 2.58507°W	—	Early 17th century	The front of the house was replaced in the early 19th century. The house is in stone with a slate roof, two storeys with attics, and three bays. The middle bay projects forward under a gable, and contains sash windows and an armorial bearing. Elsewhere the windows are mullioned.	II
Middleton Bridge; 54.30205°N 2.56991°W		17th century (probable)	The bridge, which was altered in 1911, carries the A683 road over the River Rawthey. It is in stone and consists of a single segmental arch with voussoirs, above which is an archband with another layer of voussoirs. The parapets have rounded coping, each contains a square refuge, and the ends are splayed outwards.	II
Borrens Farmhouse and barn 54.24791°N 2.57387°W	—	Late 17th or early 18th century	The house and barn are in stone with slate roofs. The house has two storeys and six bays, the sixth bay lower, and outshuts on the east side. Most of the windows are casements, and there is one sash window and one window with a mullion. To the north is a small bay connecting to the barn, which projects to the west. This contains doorways with chamfered surrounds, a mullioned window, a datestone, a loading door, and pigeon holes. At the rear is an outshut.	II
Tossbeck Farmhouse; 54.26802°N 2.57104°W	—	Late 17th or early 18th century	A stone farmhouse, partly roughcast, with a slate roof, two storeys and four irregular bays. The windows have chamfered surrounds and mullions, and contain casements, and on the front is a stair window. Three are two doorways, one that has a gabled porch with a segmental-arched opening.	II
Barn, Borrens Farm; 54.24831°N 2.57413°W	—	Early 18th century	The barn is in stone with a slate roof. On the north and south sides are entrances flanked by outshuts, in the east gable end are ventilation slits, and at the west end are cow doors.	II
Ellers and attached outbuilding 54.26716°N 2.56725°W		Early 18th century	A roughcast stone house with a slate roof and two storeys. The main part has two bays, there is an outbuilding to the right, a left lean-to, and a gabled projection at the rear. The doorway has a lintel with a sunk ogee and rosettes. The windows have chamfered surrounds and mullions, and contain casements. At the rear is a stair window with sashes.	II
Hollins Farm; 54.29134°N 2.56469°W	—	Early 18th century	The farmhouse and farm buildings are built in stone with quoins and slate roofs. The house has two storeys, two bays, a rear gabled wing and a lean-to. On the front is an open gabled porch. Most of the windows are sashes, there is one casement window, and two windows have retained mullion stubs. The farm buildings dating from about 1800 include a barn that has a flat-arched entrance with voussoirs.	II
Moore memorials 54.26985°N 2.58006°W	—	18th century	The two memorials to members of the Moore family are in the churchyard of the Church of the Holy Ghost. The tomb to the north has panels on the side, a slab with a moulded edge, and an inscribed copper plate. The other tomb has moulded lozenges, and a slab with a moulded edge.	II
Applegarth; 54.25637°N 2.57510°W	—	Late 18th or early 19th century	The farmhouse was extended in the 19th century. It is in limestone with sandstone dressings, a sill band and quoins, the extension is roughcast, and the roof is slated. There are two storeys, four bays, the fourth bay recessed, and a small gabled rear wing. On the front is a round-headed wrought iron porch and a door with a fanlight. The windows are sashes.	II
Barn, Ellers; 54.26663°N 2.56777°W		18th or early 19th century	A double bank barn with quoins, and a slate roof with coped gables on the north front. In the north front is a barn entrance, on the south side are three cow entrances and two buttresses with a larger entrance between them. Elsewhere there are square ventilation holes.	II
Privy, Hawkin Hall; 54.26557°N 2.58514°W	—	18th or 19th century (probable)	The privy is in stone with a slate roof. There is an entrance in the north side, and a small window on the east side. Inside is a timber seat with two holes.	II
Barn, Swan Inn; 54.27428°N 2.58110°W		Late 18th or early 19th century	A bank barn in stone with a slate roof. On the south front are two barn entrances, and the right part projects forward under a catslide roof. In the east gable end is a mullioned window, four cow doors, three with segmental arched heads, and three pigeon loft openings. Elsewhere is a winnowing door and square ventilation holes.	II
Milestone near Middleton Bridge; 54.29957°N 2.57063°W		Early 19th century (probable)	The milestone is set on the Sedbergh to Greta Bridge turnpike road, later the A683 road. It has a square base, and is semicircular above with broaches. The stone is inscribed with letters and numbers indicating the distances in miles to Sedbergh and to Kirkby Lonsdale.	II
Milestone near Middleton Hall; 54.28561°N 2.57625°W		Early 19th century	The milestone is set on the Sedbergh to Greta Bridge turnpike road, later the A683 road. It has a square base, and is semicircular above with broaches. The stone is inscribed with letters and numbers indicating the distances in miles to Sedbergh and to Kirkby Lonsdale.	II
Milestone near Sorrowsdyke Lane; 54.25759°N 2.58347°W	—	Early 19th century (probable)	The milestone is set on the Sedbergh to Greta Bridge turnpike road, later the A683 road. It has a square base, and is semicircular above with broaches. The stone is inscribed with letters and numbers indicating the distances in miles to Sedbergh and to Kirkby Lonsdale. Above the base is a benchmark.	II
Church of the Holy Ghost; 54.26995°N 2.58024°W		1878–79	The church, replacing earlier churches on the site, was designed by C. J. Ferguson in Perpendicular style. It is in stone, and has a slate roof with coped gables. The church consists of a nave and a chancel in a single cell, and a north vestry. On the chancel arch is a gabled bellcote.	II
Rigmaden Bridge; 54.25793°N 2.58970°W		1880s	The bridge carries a road over the River Lune. The deck of the bridge is carried on triangular iron girders, and it has a cast iron parapet with decorative panels. The abutments are in stone and have brick parapets with stone coping. To the east is a round arch to take flood water with a pier and a triangular cutwater.	II
