= Middleton, Cumbria =

Village and civil parish in Cumbria, England

Coordinates: 54.268°N 2.579°W

Middleton
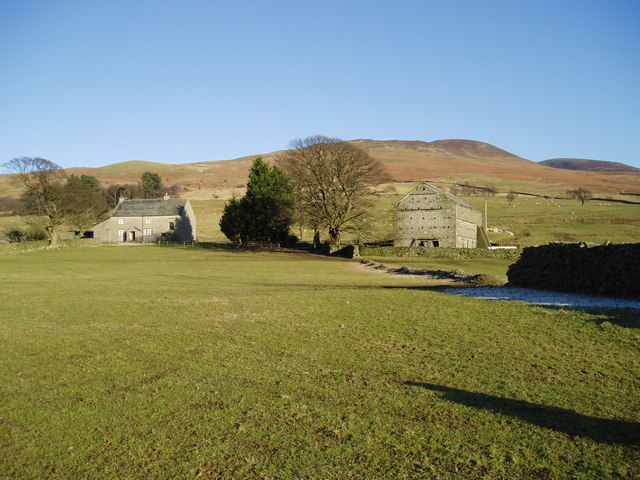
- Ellers Farm in Middleton with Middleton Fell behind

- Location in South Lakeland Location within Cumbria
- OS grid reference: SD622859
- Civil parish: Middleton
- Unitary authority: Westmorland and Furness
- Ceremonial county: Cumbria
- Region: North West
- Country: England
- Sovereign state: United Kingdom
- Post town: CARNFORTH
- Postcode district: LA6
- Dialling code: 015242
- Police: Cumbria
- Fire: Cumbria
- Ambulance: North West
- UK Parliament: Westmorland and Lonsdale

Middleton is a village and civil parish on the A683 road, in the Westmorland and Furness unitary authority area, in the ceremonial county of Cumbria, England. Middleton has a church called Holy Ghost Church and a pub called The Head at Middleton. Middleton railway station was opened in 1861 and closed in 1931. The population of the civil parish as taken at the 2011 Census was less than 100. It is therefore included in the parish of Dent. From 1974 to 2013 it was in South Lakeland district.

== See also ==
- Listed buildings in Middleton, Cumbria
