= Barbon Beck =

River in Cumbria, England

Coordinates: 54.2294°N 2.6015°W

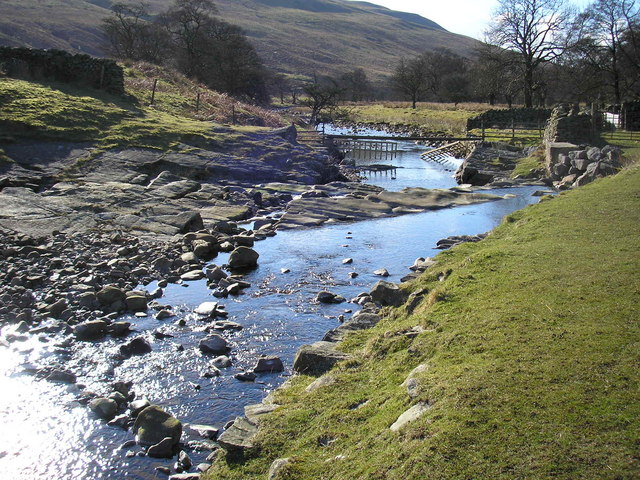
Barbon Beck near its confluence with Aygill

Barbon Beck is a small river in Barbondale, Cumbria. It is a tributary of the River Lune.

== Course ==
Rising at Weather Ling Hill, where it is known as Barkin Beck, the stream passes southwest down Barbondale to Fell House, where, joined by Aygill (itself fed by Hazel Sike, which, like Aygill, rises on Barbon High Fell) and from there known as Barbon Beck, it takes a westerly course, past Barbon Manor and through the village of Barbon and under the A683 road. At High Beckfoot, it passes under High Beckfoot Bridge, a Grade-II-listed packhorse bridge, before meeting the River Lune opposite Mansergh Hall.

Historically, the source and upper reaches of Barbon Beck were in the West Riding of Yorkshire.
