= Ingleton branch line =

UK railway branch line

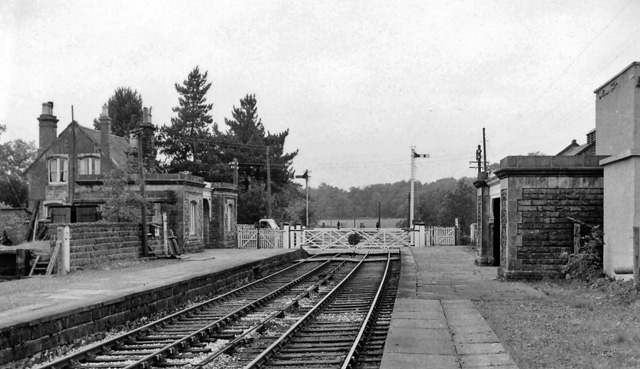
- Barbon railway station in 1962

Overview
- Locale: North Yorkshire, Lancashire and Cumbria, England

Service
- Operator(s): Lancaster and Carlisle Railway, British Rail

History
- Commenced: 1858
- Opened: 16 September 1861
- Closed: 1 October 1964

Technical
- Track gauge: 4 ft 8 1/2 in (1,435 mm) standard gauge

The Ingleton branch line was a rural railway line in the West Riding of Yorkshire, Lancashire and Westmorland in England (now North Yorkshire, Lancashire and Cumbria). It was originally planned in 1846 to form part of a main line route from London to Scotland, but fell victim to rivalry between railway companies. Completion was delayed until 1861, and it was only ever a rural branch line, serving the village of Ingleton and towns of Kirkby Lonsdale and Sedbergh. It closed to passengers in 1954 and was dismantled in 1967.

== Plans ==
In 1846, the North Western Railway (NWR) was formed to connect the Leeds and Bradford Extension Railway at Skipton to the Lancaster and Carlisle Railway (L&CR) south of Tebay, with a secondary branch from Clapham to Lancaster. In 1849, the route between Skipton and Ingleton opened, but further work northward was abandoned due to financial difficulties, the company deciding to concentrate instead on the cheaper branch to Lancaster. When the route from Skipton to Lancaster opened in 1850, the short section from Clapham to Ingleton closed.

Other railway companies had an interest in the line north of Ingleton being built, as it could form part of a main-line route from London to Scotland shorter than the existing West Coast Main Line. Over the next few years were many negotiations between the NWR and the L&CR, the Midland Railway (MR), the Great Northern Railway (GNR) and the London and North Western Railway (LNWR). The original time limit, set by Parliament in 1846, for the construction of the line was about to expire, so a further five-year extension was obtained by the NWR in 1852. However, negotiations failed and it became clear the line could not be built even within the new timescale. Eventually, in 1857, two rival bills were put before Parliament. One was from the NWR, with the support of the GNR who hoped to form a mainline route from London to Scotland. The proposed route was from Ingleton to Kirkby Lonsdale, then straight up the Lune valley to join the L&CR line just south of Tebay. The other bill was from the L&CR itself, which wanted to block its rival GNR's ambitions to reach Scotland. The L&CR route differed from the proposed NWR route in two ways: it passed closer to the town of Sedbergh and it joined the main L&CR line significantly further south at the existing Low Gill station. A Commons committee decided to accept the L&CR scheme, and its bill was passed on 25 August 1857 as the Lancaster and Carlisle and Ingleton Railway Act 1857 (20 & 21 Vict. c. clxi).

== Construction ==
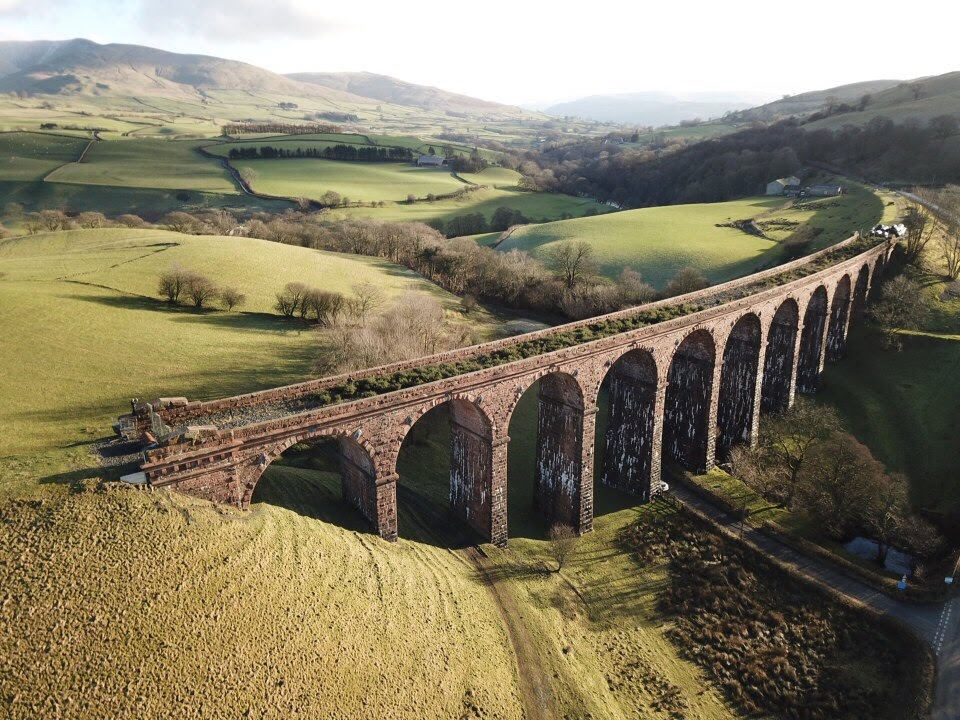
Lowgill Viaduct

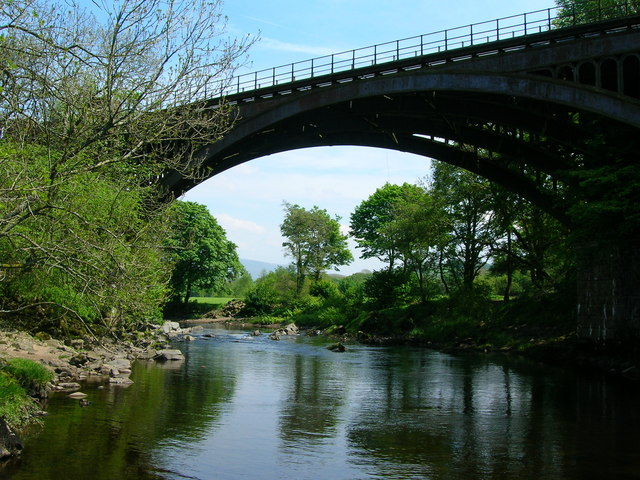
Rawthey Bridge near Sedbergh

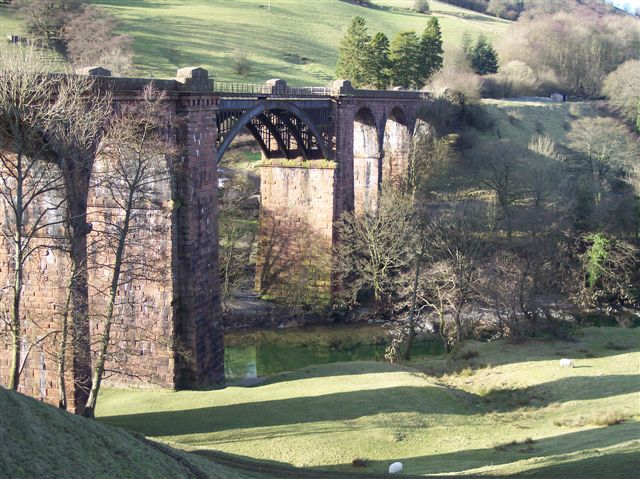
Waterside Viaduct near Sedbergh

The line was built by the Lancaster and Carlisle Railway between 1858 and 1861, and the work was split into four contracts.

Contract 1A covered 1 mile 6 chains (1.7 km) from Lowgill, and included the Lowgill Viaduct of 11 arches each 45 feet (14 m) wide, with a maximum height of 90 feet (27 m). It was awarded to Samuel Buxton of Leeds.

Contract 1 covered 4 miles 38 chains (7.2 km) and included two major bridges, one over the River Rawthey near Sedbergh, 120 feet (37 m) long and 53 feet (16 m) high, the other over the River Lune, known as Waterside Viaduct, 530 feet (162 m) long and 100 feet (30 m) high, both with a cast metal central arch of similar style to each other. It was awarded to Coulthard and Allen, who had built the Clapham to Ingleton NWR line some 10 years earlier.

Contract 2 covered 7 miles 27 chains (11.8 km) over flatter ground with no major works, and was awarded to James Taylor.

Contract 3 covered the final 5 miles 78 chains (9.6 km) ending at the Ingleton Viaduct of 11 arches each 57 feet (17 m) wide, 800 feet (240 m) long with a maximum height of 80 feet (24 m) (the foundations of which had been laid ten years earlier by the NWR). It was also awarded to James Taylor.

Some 1,600 navvies and 70 horses were used to build the 18-mile (29 km) line.

Before construction, the line had been referred to as the "Orton branch" or the "Lune Valley line", but, once built, it was officially known as the "Ingleton branch".

There are no tunnels along the line, except for a short one on a mineral railway that branched off from the main line at Ingleton.

== Operation ==
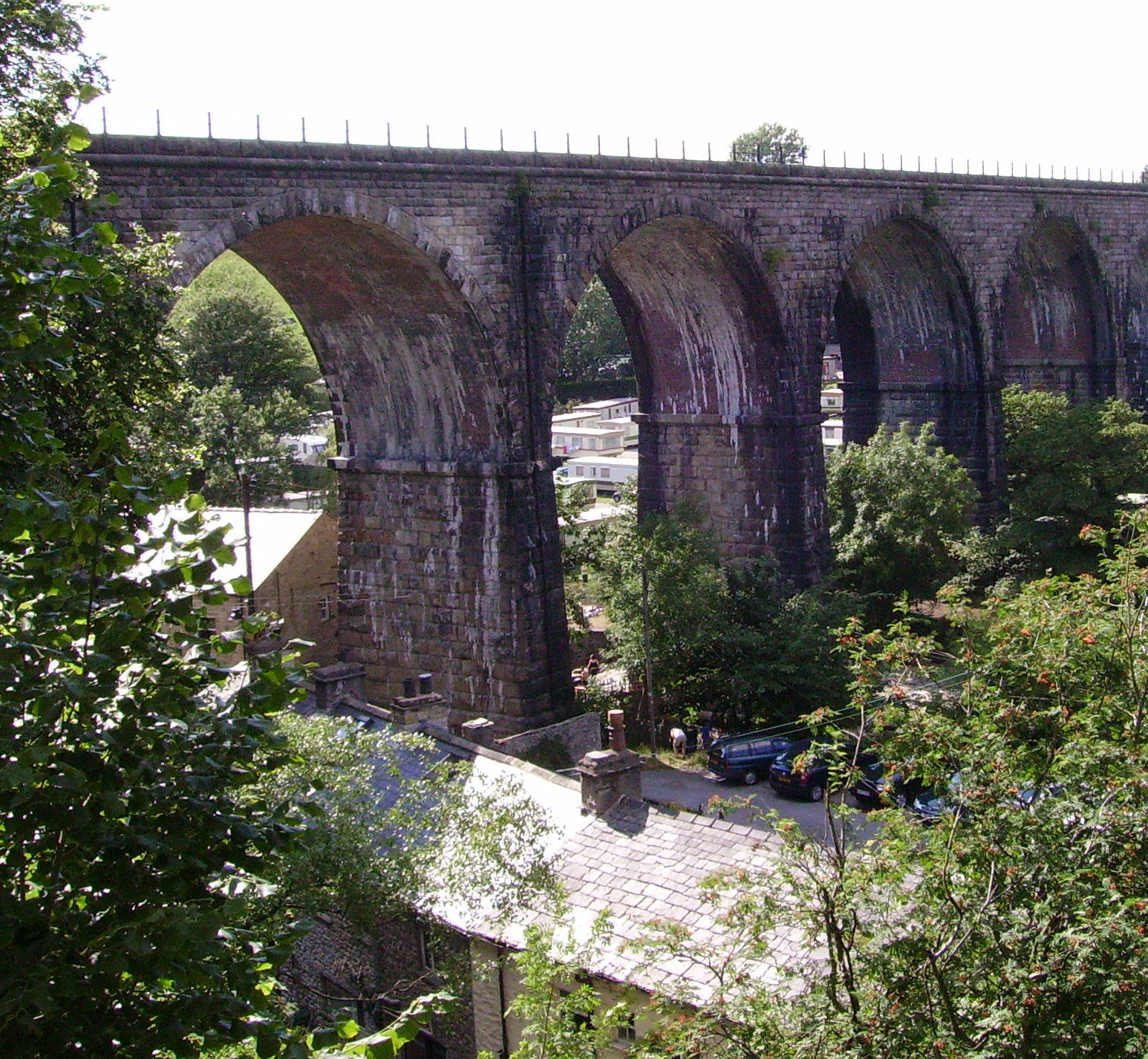
Ingleton Viaduct

The line was opened to passengers on 16 September 1861, by which time the LNWR had taken control of the L&CR, and its rival the MR had taken over the NWR, which still owned the line beyond Ingleton. The rival companies could not come to agreement over the sharing of the Midland station at Ingleton, and so the L&CR built its own station at Ingleton, the two stations being at opposite ends of the Ingleton Viaduct. In the early days of the line, through passengers had to walk nearly a mile (1½ km) between the two Ingleton stations, descending into the valley below and climbing up the other side, where they often had a long wait as the companies did not cooperate over timetabling either. Soon after, the MR agreed to allow LNWR trains to terminate at the Midland station, but both Ingleton stations remained open and connections were not timetabled. Ingleton (LNWR) station was closed in 1917 but it was not until the 1923 "grouping" of the LNWR and MR into the London, Midland and Scottish Railway that the division at Ingleton was removed, and the whole route from Clapham to Tebay was operated with through trains.

The Midland Railway wanted to use the Ingleton branch to form part of a main line from London to Scotland, but the LNWR, which already had its own London–Scotland line, refused to cooperate. This led to the Midland obtaining a bill in 1866 to construct the Settle–Carlisle Line, which would serve the same purpose. Subsequently, the MR and LNWR came to an agreement over the Ingleton branch and the MR wished to abandon its plan for the Settle–Carlisle Line but Parliament refused in 1869, so the line was built anyway. This sealed the fate of the Ingleton branch to remain a rural branch line and never obtain main line status. Nevertheless, the line was used as a relief route whenever other lines to Scotland were temporarily closed.

The line was double throughout. The steepest gradient was the final 4 3/4 miles (7.6 km) to Low Gill at 1 in 100. The ruling speed limit was 60 mph, with 45 mph at Ingleton and the last 5 miles, and 20 mph over Waterside and Rawthey bridges. Each station controlled its signals and there was an intermediate block post at Newby Moor until 1937, installed after a crash on 22 July 1891 between a goods and a mixed train. All the stations were of stone, with low, short platforms. Sedbergh had a water tank and column. Ingleton Midland had a bay. Mostly the line had 1 goods and four 2-coach passenger trains a day in each direction, but reduced to 2 in 1944, 1947 and 1951.

== Closure ==
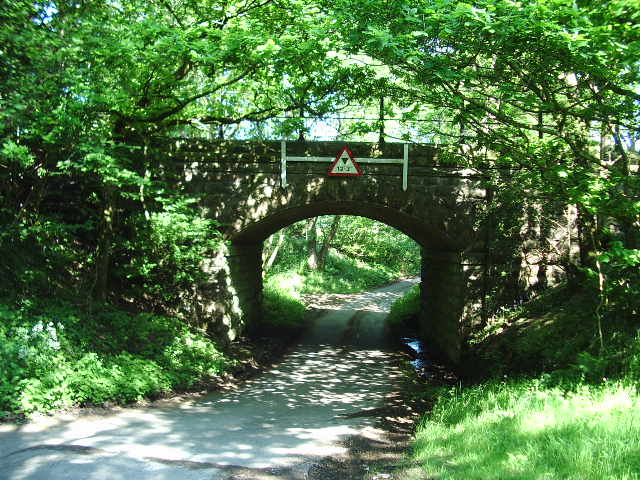
Railway bridge over Jordan Lane

All but Ingleton and Barbon stations were distant from their towns, collieries at Ingleton closed in 1925 and 1935, as did 2 limestone quarries, Barbon creamery switched its traffic to road. Middleton on Lune station closed in 1931 After rail nationalisation in 1948, it was becoming uneconomical to operate both the Ingleton Line and the parallel Settle–Carlisle Line. Although the Ingleton line was much shorter and would have been cheaper to maintain, it was decided that the loss of the Settle line would have much greater impact on rural communities, and so on 30 January 1954 the Ingleton line closed to regular passenger traffic. The line was still occasionally used for weekend excursions and to transport pupils to and from local boarding schools. Goods traffic continued until 1 October 1964, although a goods service between Clapham and Ingleton continued for another five months after that. The line was maintained as a possible relief route until April 1967 when the tracks were lifted.

== Preservation ==
A section of the trackbed south of Kirkby Lonsdale was used by the re-aligned A65 road between Cowan Bridge and Ingleton. Several of the old stations have been adapted as private residences (e.g. Kirkby Lonsdale, Barbon and Sedbergh). Both stations at Ingleton have been demolished – the former LNWR depot is now a commercial unit while the ex-MR site is a car park and community/tourist information centre. The three major viaducts at Ingleton, Sedbergh and Lowgill are now Grade II listed buildings as is the iron girder arched truss bridge over the River Rawthey near Sedbergh (which now carries a gas supply pipe).
