= Low Gill railway station =

Disused railway station in Lowgill, Cumbria

Low Gill
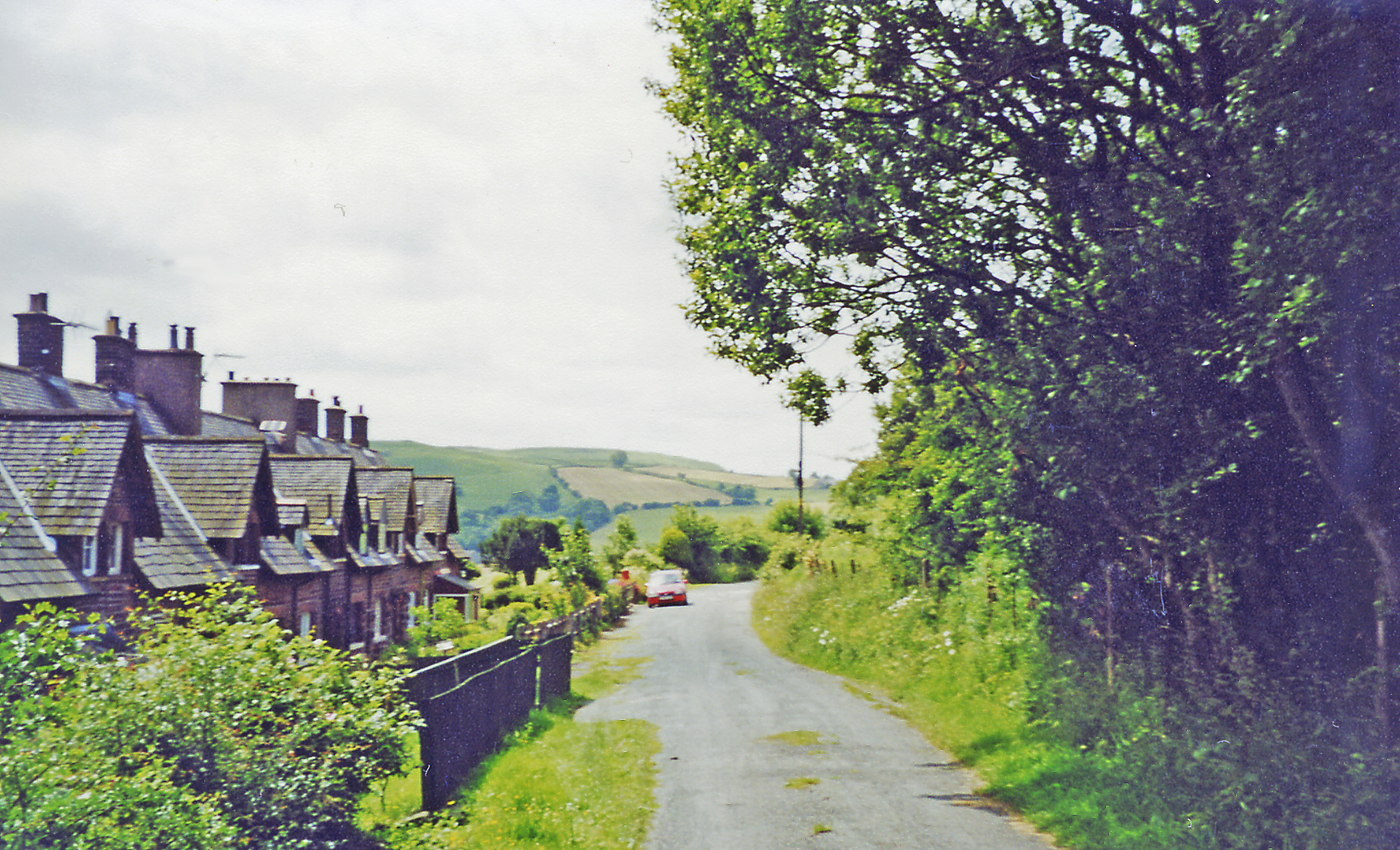
- The site of the station (behind the bushes on the right) in 2003

General information
- Location: Lowgill, Cumbria; England
- Coordinates: 54.3698°N 2.5818°W
- Grid reference: SD623973
- Platforms: 4

Other information
- Status: Disused

History
- Original company: Lancaster and Carlisle Railway
- Pre-grouping: London and North Western Railway
- Post-grouping: London, Midland and Scottish Railway

Key dates
- 17 December 1846: First station opened
- 16 September 1861: Second station opened as Low Gill Junction
- 1 November 1861: First station closed
- 1883: Second station renamed Low Gill
- 7 March 1960: Closed to passengers
- 26 July 1966: Closed to goods
Location
- Location within the former South Lakeland district Location within Cumbria

Low Gill railway station served the hamlet of Lowgill, Westmorland (now in Cumbria), England, from 1846 to 1966 on the Lancaster and Carlisle Railway.

== History ==
The first station opened on 17 December 1846 by the Lancaster and Carlisle Railway. A second station opened as Low Gill Junction on 16 September 1861, at the junction of the railway's Ingleton branch line with the main line, rendering the first station useless so it closed on 1 November 1861. The suffix "Junction" was dropped from the second station's name in 1883 when the London and North Western Railway took over the line. It closed on 7 March 1960 and closed to goods on 26 July 1966.

Preceding station	Historical railways	Following station
Tebay; Line open, station closed	Lancaster and Carlisle Railway	Grayrigg; Line open, station closed
	Disused railways	
Tebay; Line open, station closed	Lancaster and Carlisle Railway; Ingleton branch line	Sedbergh; Line and station closed
