= Lancaster Green Ayre railway station =

Former station in Lancashire, England

Lancaster Green Ayre
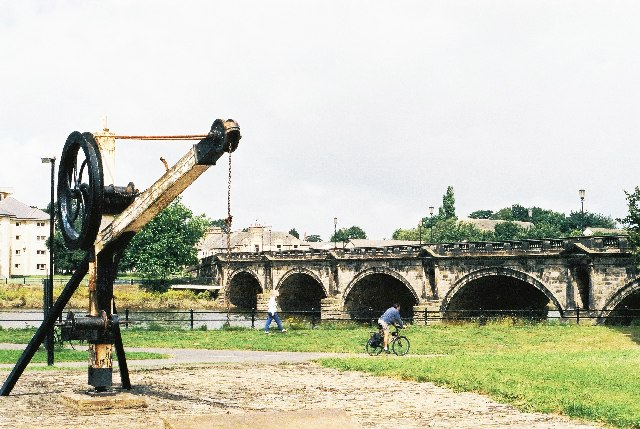
- Old goods crane on the station site (2005)

General information
- Location: Lancaster, City of Lancaster; England
- Coordinates: 54.0526°N 2.7973°W

Other information
- Status: Disused

History
- Original company: Morecambe Harbour and Railway
- Pre-grouping: Midland Railway
- Post-grouping: London, Midland and Scottish Railway

Key dates
- 12 June 1848: Opened as Lancaster
- 1 June 1850: Incorrectly listed as Lancaster Green Area
- 1 November 1870: Listed as Lancaster Green Ayre
- 3 January 1966: Closed
- 1976: Demolished
Location
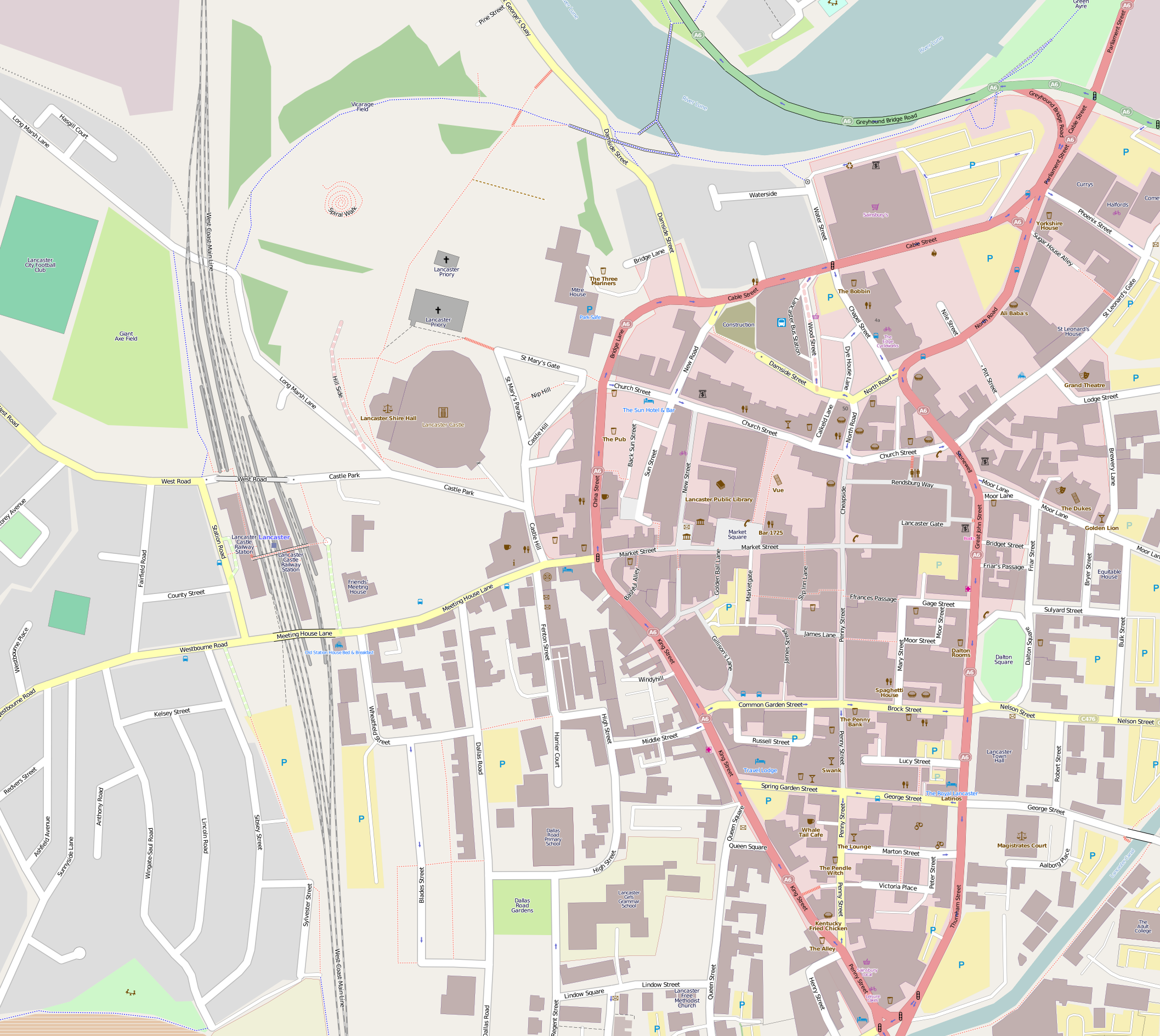
- Location within Lancaster city centre Location within Lancaster Location within the City of Lancaster district Location within Lancashire

Lancaster Green Ayre railway station was the Midland Railway's station in the city of Lancaster, England. The line between Green Ayre and Morecambe was used for pioneering experimental electrification via overhead wires.

The station closed to passengers in 1966 and no trace of it remain.

== History ==
Lancaster's first two stations were the Lancaster and Preston Junction Railway's at Greaves in 1840, and the Lancaster and Carlisle Railway's Lancaster Castle, which superseded it in 1846.

The third station was opened by the Morecambe Harbour and Railway Company (MH&R) on 12 June 1848. The station building was designed by Edmund Sharpe. Originally called Lancaster, it was soon renamed Lancaster Green Ayre, although timetables incorrectly listed its name as Lancaster Green Area until 1870. The line originally ran from Lancaster to Morecambe Harbour. The MH&R soon amalgamated with the "little" North Western Railway, which continued the line eastward from 17 November 1849, reaching Skipton in 1850. A connecting curve between Green Ayre and Castle opened on 18 December 1849.

The station was on the southern bank of the River Lune, adjacent to Skerton Bridge and immediately north of the city centre. Immediately west of the station was the junction between the connecting curve to Castle and Green Ayre’s engine shed, and the main line, which then crossed the river via Greyhound Bridge and continued along the north bank of the river, passing under the Lancaster and Carlisle's Carlisle Bridge over the river. East of Green Ayre the line followed the south bank of the river.

=== Take-over by the Midland Railway ===
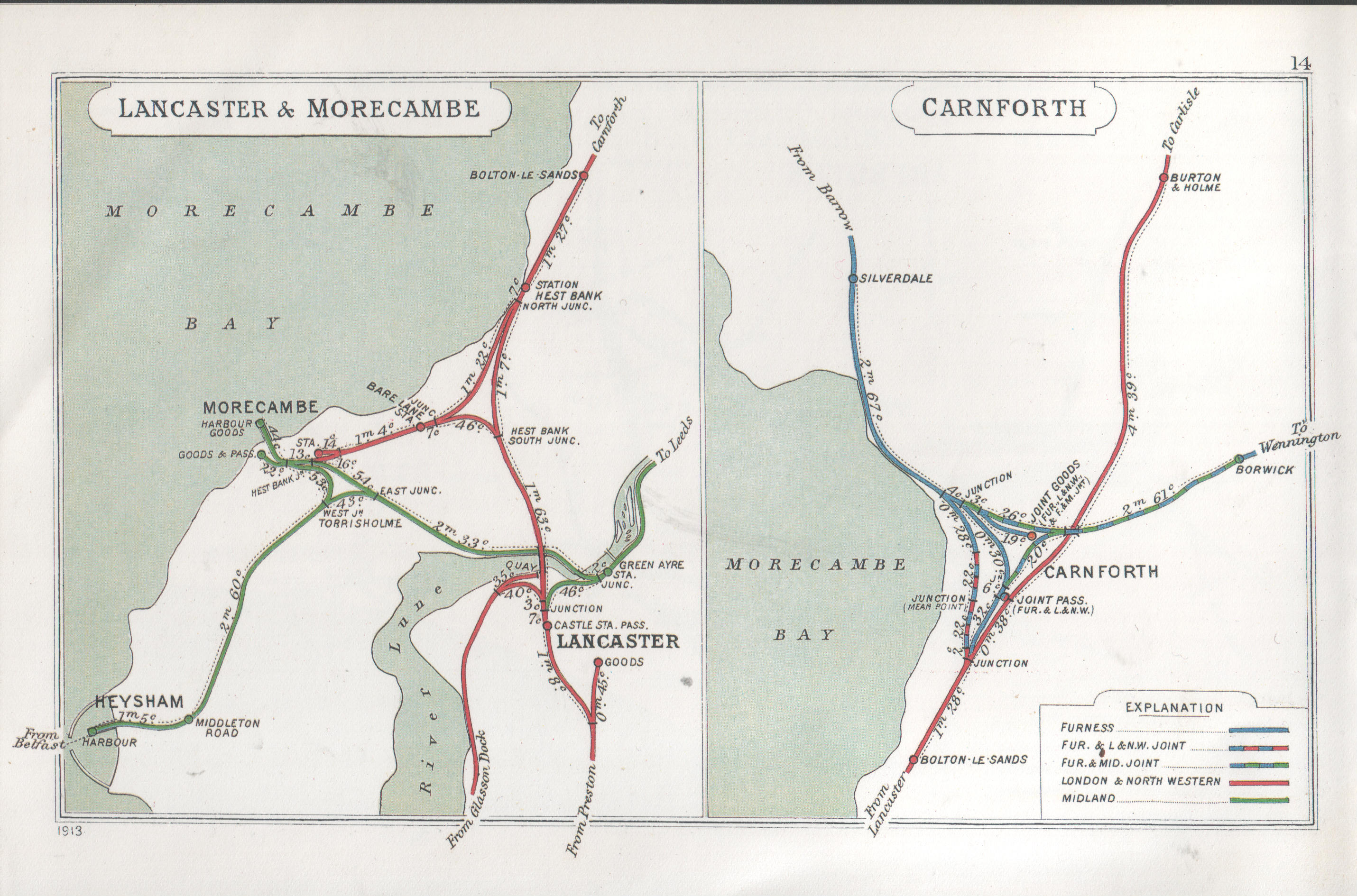
Railways around Lancaster and Morecambe in 1913

The "little" North Western Railway was taken over in 1874 by the Midland Railway, which had previously operated and then leased the line, and became a significant route for that company, giving access from its Yorkshire lines to the Lancashire coast in an area dominated by its major rival, the London and North Western Railway.

The Lancaster–Morecambe line was electrified in 1908. This was the first high-voltage overhead electrification in the United Kingdom and at 6,600 volts AC, 25 Hz; it was the pioneer for such systems. It was intended to be a test bed for further mainline electrification by the Midland Railway. In 1952 the original rolling stock had reached the end of its service life and was withdrawn. Steam traction took over for a short while and then the power supply was upgraded to 50 Hz and some new stock provided; this was to act as a test-bed for further main-line electrification in the UK. This section of line became particularly busy.

=== Run Down ===
The line between Wennington and Morecambe via Green Ayre fell victim to the Beeching Axe. It closed to passengers on 2 January 1966, although freight services continued through the station until 16 March 1976. The station was demolished that year.

The Greyhound Bridge was converted for use by the A589 road from 1972. The site of Green Ayre station is now a public park. Nothing remains of the station, but a goods crane from Hornby goods shed has been erected in the park near the site. The site of the adjacent locomotive shed is now occupied by a supermarket.

== See also ==
- List of architectural works by Edmund Sharpe

| Preceding station | Disused railways | Following station |
|---|---|---|
| Halton | Midland Railway "Little" North Western Railway | Morecambe (Northumberland Street) until 1907 |
| Halton | Midland Railway; North Western Branch | Morecambe Promenade; 1907–1957 |
| Halton | London Midland Region; North Western Branch | Scale Hall from 1957 |
| Halton | Midland Railway "Little" North Western Railway; Castle Branch | Lancaster Castle |
