= Claughton railway station =

Former station in Lancashire, England

Claughton

General information
- Location: Claughton, Lancaster, Lancashire; England
- Coordinates: 54.09546°N 2.66709°W
- Platforms: 2

Other information
- Status: Disused

History
- Original company: "Little" North Western Railway

Key dates
- 17 November 1849: Opened
- May 1853: Closed
- 3 January 1966: Line closed between Wennington and Morecambe to passengers
- 5 June 1967: Line closed between Wennington and Morecambe to freight
Location
- Location within the City of Lancaster district Location within Lancashire

Claughton railway station served the village of Claughton in the City of Lancaster district of Lancashire, England.

The station was located near Low Lane at a level crossing, but was only in service for a short period (passenger traffic ceasing as early as May 1853). A private goods siding serving the nearby brickworks was laid soon after the 1923 Grouping by the LMS.

The line remained in use until closure to passengers in 1966 between Wennington and Morecambe Promenade.

Freight services finished the following year in June 1967 and the track was then dismantled. The formation has since been returned to agricultural land east of Caton. The station house survives as a private residence.

Preceding station	Disused railways	Following station
Hornby	Midland Railway "Little" North Western Railway	Caton
