= Caton railway station =

Former station in Lancashire, England

Caton

General information
- Location: Caton, Lancaster, Lancashire; England
- Coordinates: 54.0772°N 2.7186°W
- Platforms: 2

Other information
- Status: Disused

History
- Opened: 17 November 1849
- Closed: 1 May 1961
- Original company: "Little" North Western Railway
- Pre-grouping: Midland Railway
- Post-grouping: London, Midland and Scottish Railway

Key dates
- January 1966: Line closed between Wennington and Morecambe to passengers
- June 1967: Line closed between Wennington and Morecambe to freight
Location
- Location within the City of Lancaster district Location within Lancashire

Caton railway station served the village of Caton in the City of Lancaster district of Lancashire, England.

The station was located near Ball Lane and Station Road, with the latter crossing the railway on the level immediately to the east. It opened with the line in November 1849, being built by the "Little" North Western Railway. The route was initially constructed as single track, with a passing loop here - the Lancaster to Hornby stretch eventually being doubled by the Midland Railway in 1889.

The station was closed in May 1961 by British Railways as an economy measure, though the line remained in use until closure to passengers in 1966 between Wennington and Morecambe.

Freight services finished the following year in 1967 and the track was subsequently dismantled. The line has since been converted into a footpath and cycleway westwards towards Lancaster, including the two old railway viaducts across the River Lune at Crook o' Lune.

The station house survives as a private residence, whilst the old goods shed is now a church. The old formation eastwards is still visible from nearby roads and can be traced via satellite photos.

Preceding station	Disused railways	Following station
Claughton	Midland Railway "Little" North Western Railway	Halton (Lancashire)
