= Halton railway station (Lancashire) =

Former station in England

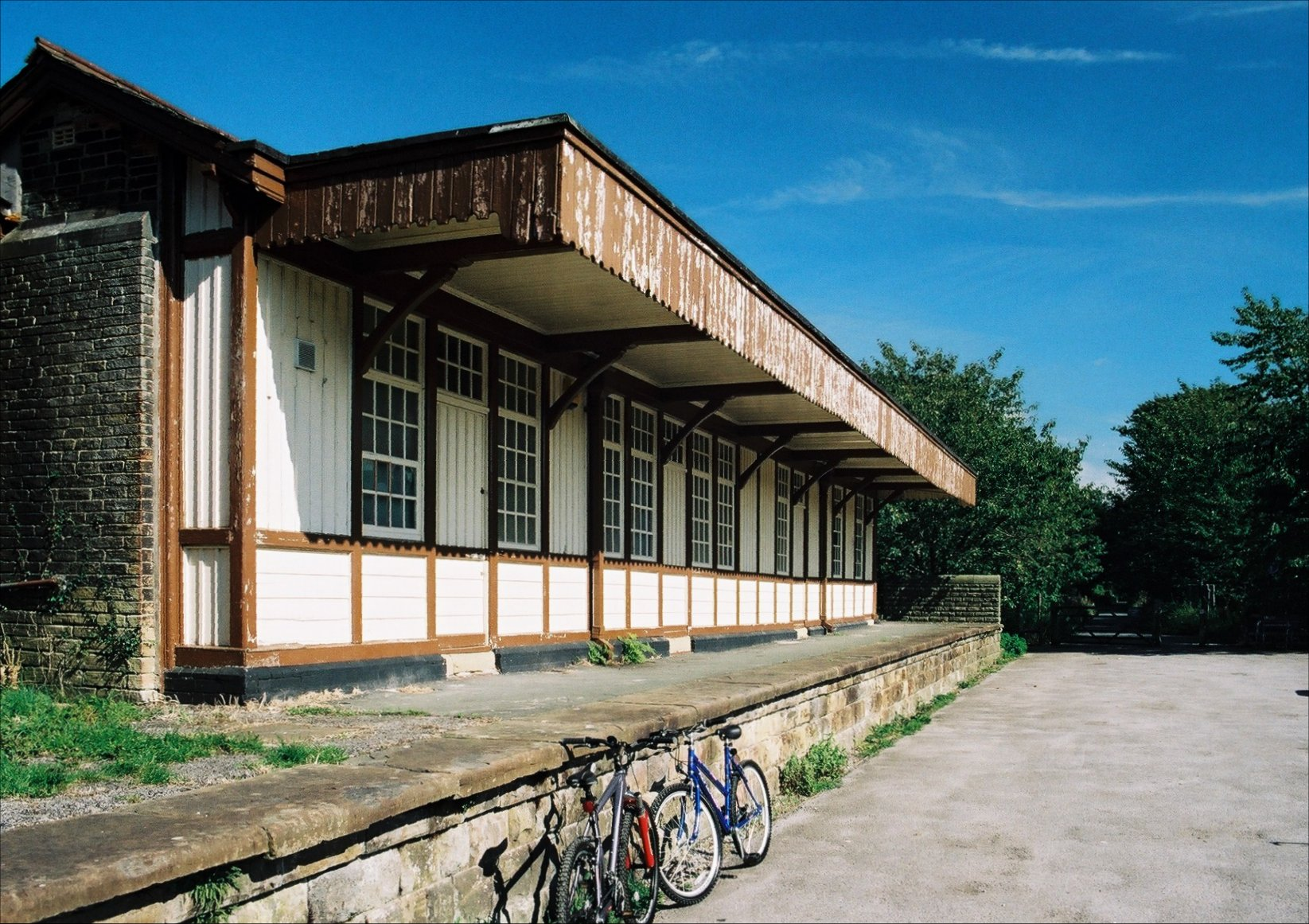
- Remains in 2008

General information
- Location: Halton, Lancaster, Lancashire; England
- Coordinates: 54.0747°N 2.7600°W
- Platforms: 2

Other information
- Status: Disused

History
- Original company: "Little" North Western Railway
- Pre-grouping: Midland Railway
- Post-grouping: London, Midland and Scottish Railway

Key dates
- 17 November 1849: Opened
- 3 January 1966: Closed
Location
- Location within the City of Lancaster district Location within Lancashire

Halton railway station served the village of Halton in Lancashire, England. It closed in 1966, but the station building and part of one platform survive beside the cycle path along the disused line.

In reference books the station is sometimes referred to as Halton (Lancs) to distinguish it from another Halton railway station in Cheshire (now also disused).

== History ==
The station was opened on 17 November 1849 by the "little" North Western Railway. It was linked to Halton village by a railway-owned narrow toll bridge across the River Lune. A rebuilt version of the bridge is still in use, free of charge.

The original timber station was destroyed by fire on 3 April 1907. A spark from the engine of a passing Heysham–St Pancras boat train set fire to a wagon of oil drums by the goods shed. The fire brigade were unable to cross the narrow bridge and it was left to a special trainload of railway workers from Lancaster to pass buckets of water from the river. The station was rebuilt in brick and timber and the building survives to this day, used as storage by Lancaster University Rowing Club, with a public car park occupying the former track bed.

The station closed on 3 January 1966, along with the whole line between Wennington and Morecambe. Cyclists and walkers can travel along the former line in either direction. Beneath the trackbed, east of the station, can be heard running water that is extracted from the river to an underground pumping station in Quernmore Park.

== Notes ==
Preceding station	Disused railways	Following station
Caton	Midland Railway "Little" North Western Railway	Lancaster Green Ayre
