= Jim Bowen =

English comedian and television personality (1937–2018)

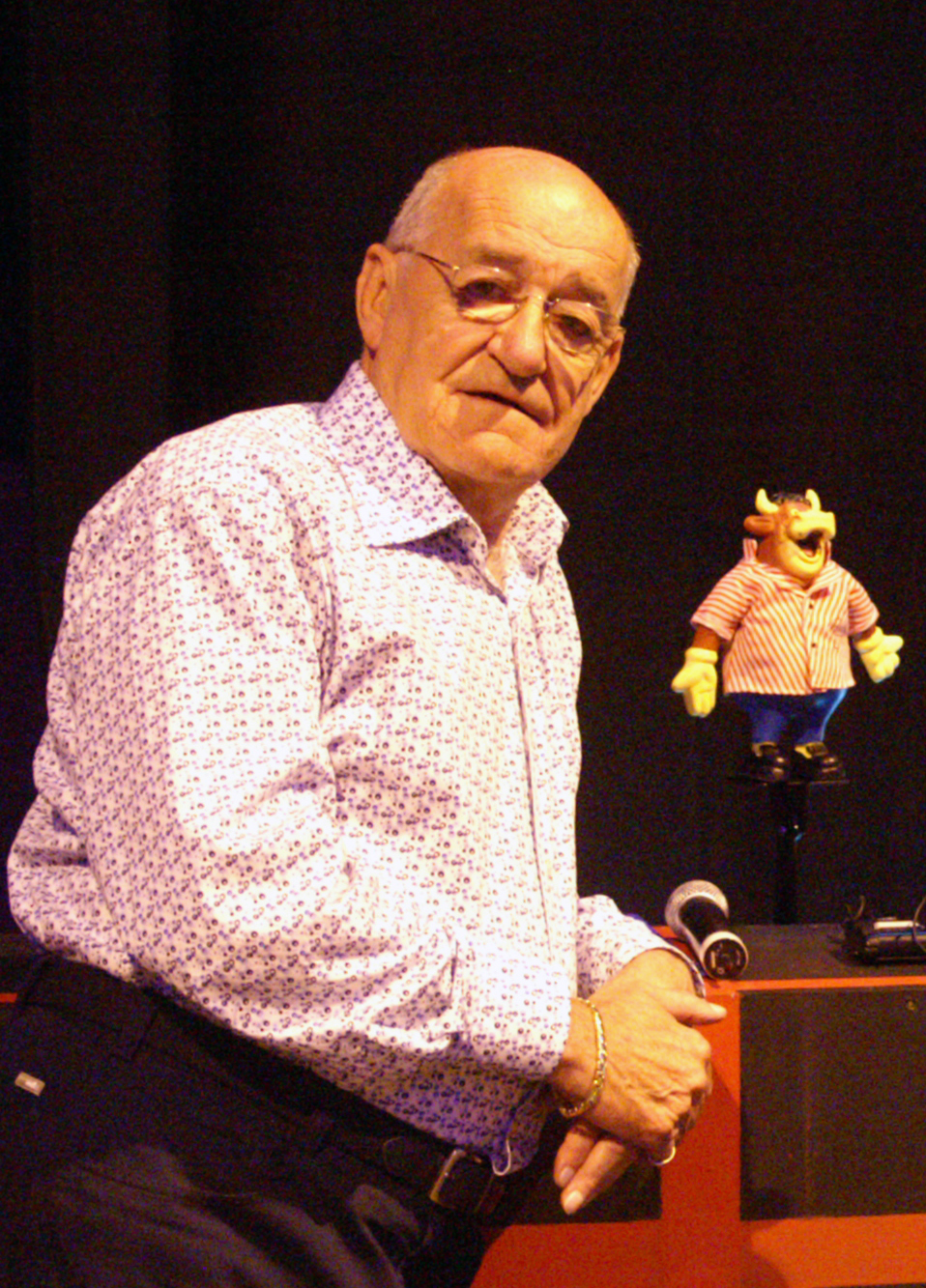
- Bowen in 2008
- Born: Peter Williams; 20 August 1937; Heswall, Cheshire, England
- Died: 14 March 2018 (aged 80); Melling-with-Wrayton, Lancashire, England
- Other name: James Brown Whittaker
- Occupations: Stand-up; comedian; presenter; radio presenter; TV personality; actor
- Years active: 1971–2014
- Television: Bullseye (1981–1995); The Comedians (1971–1993)
- Spouse: Phyllis Owen (m. 1959)
- Children: 2
- Website: jimbowen.tv

James Brown Whittaker (born Peter Williams; 20 August 1937 – 14 March 2018), known professionally as Jim Bowen, was an English stand-up comedian, actor and television personality. He was the long-time host of the ITV game show Bullseye, which he presented from its beginning in 1981 through to the end of its original run in 1995.

In early adulthood, Bowen was a teacher and took part in local dramatic groups. He first appeared on television in The Comedians (1971) and he eventually devoted himself to comedy full-time, appearing in other television shows in the 1970s. After the popular Bullseye, he subsequently worked for various radio stations and toured with stand-up shows. Towards the end of his life he was affected by a number of strokes.

== Early life ==
Peter Williams was born on 20 August 1937 in Heswall, Cheshire, to an unmarried mother and was adopted at nine months from an orphanage on the Wirral, by a working-class couple, Joe Whittaker, a First World War veteran, and his wife, Annie Whittaker, who were both from Clayton-le-Moors, Lancashire. He grew up in Clayton-le-Moors, just outside Accrington, where Joe was a bricklayer for Accrington's Nori brick factory and Annie worked as a weaver at Atlas Street Mill. He was educated at Accrington Grammar School, but failed all but one of his O-levels and subsequently worked as a dustman in Burnley. He later changed his name to James Whittaker.

During his National Service, Bowen served in the Royal Army Ordnance Corps from 1955 to 1957 as an ammunition inspector with the rank of Corporal. After making a serious error during the Suez Crisis, when he sent the wrong batch of ammunition to Barry Docks, he was sent on a Physical Training course in Aldershot to become an instructor, and later became a school Physical Education teacher specialising in gymnastics. He studied at Chester Diocesan Training College, eventually becoming a deputy headmaster at St. Paul's primary school in Caton, near Lancaster.

== Television ==
While teaching, Bowen became involved with the local dramatic society, which kindled his interest in show business. In the 1960s, he worked part-time as a stand-up comedian on the northern club circuit, balancing his comedy career with his day job as a teacher. After having become disillusioned with his teaching career, he was inspired to take up comedy full-time, after seeing Ken Dodd perform a well-received show in front of 3,500 in Blackpool. He took his stage name from his wife's maiden name, Owen, adding the initial of his mother's, Brown. The advent of Granada TV’s The Comedians in 1971 gave him the opportunity to appear on national television, which ultimately helped persuade him to become a full-time entertainer.

Television opportunities followed, and he made appearances in Last of the Summer Wine as a library attendant, and on Granada's The Wheeltappers and Shunters Social Club. He also starred alongside Ray Burdis, John Blundell, Pauline Quirke and the pop group Flintlock in two series of Thames Television's children's sketch show You Must Be Joking in 1975 and 1976.

Bowen also appeared in TV dramas and comedies. In 1981 he played "Dad" in the Victoria Wood television play Happy Since I Met You. He played a crooked accountant in ITV's 1982 mini-series Muck and Brass, and later guest-starred in BBC1's Jonathan Creek and Channel 4's Phoenix Nights, playing the hotel owner Frank "Hoss" Cartwright. He subsequently appeared in Peter Kay's 2005 Comic Relief video for "(Is This the Way to) Amarillo"?

His last television appearance was in an interview about the game show Bullseye, recorded a few weeks before his death, for the Matthew Kelly clips and countdown show Top of the Box 1985, repeated on Channel 5 as Greatest TV Moments of the 80s in 2023.

=== Bullseye ===
In 1981, Bowen became the presenter of a new ITV game show, Bullseye, which mixed general knowledge questions with darts. The show quickly became a popular feature of ITV's schedules on Sunday early evenings, achieving 15–20 million viewers and at times obtaining higher ratings than prime-time soap operas. It ran for fourteen years. On the back of his fame, he delivered several speeches at the Oxford Union.

Bowen was the presenter throughout, alongside Tony Green as the darts commentator, and several of the catchphrases he used on the programme became well-known (though he claimed never to have said "Super, smashing, great"). (Note: At a 1992 Oxford Union address, Bowen was annoyed by a heckler asking him to say "super, smashing great"; he did so and followed it with "does that make you feel better? Yer dick head.") He would warn contestants that if they gambled and lost, all they would receive was their "BFH: Bus Fare Home". "Keep out of the black and in the red; nothing in this game for two in a bed" referred to how contestants would win a prize by hitting the appropriate part of the dartboard, but would lose the prize if they hit it twice. He always told contestants who lost the gamble to "look at what you could have won".

== Radio and stage ==
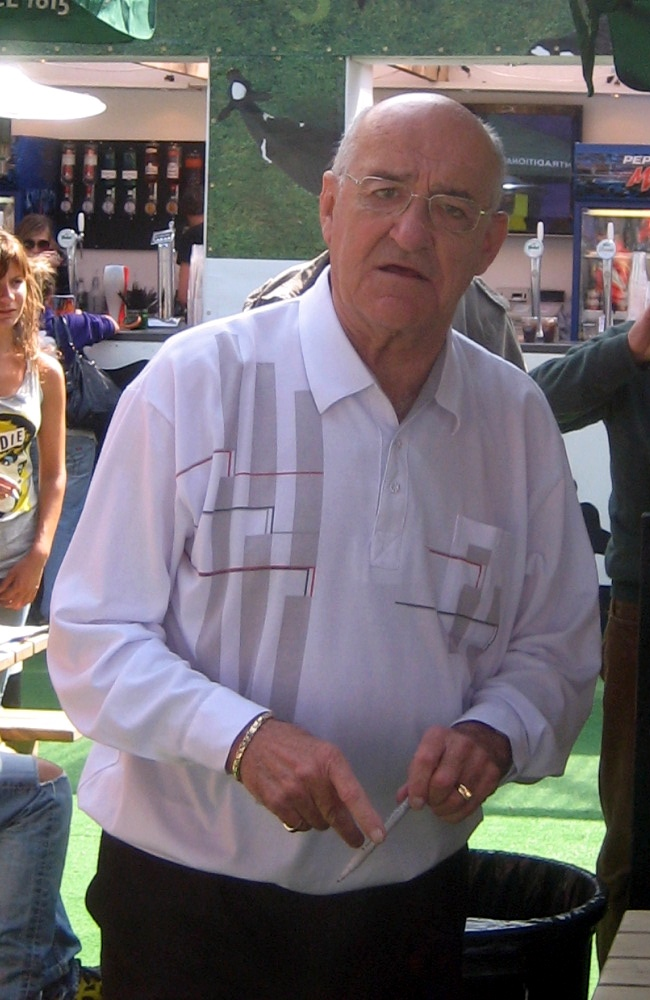
Bowen at the Edinburgh Festival Fringe in 2008

In 1999, Bowen began presenting on BBC Radio Lancashire, but in 2002 he resigned after referring to a guest on his show as a "nig-nog". He apologised for the remark almost immediately, and afterwards stated: "No racial connotation was ever intended". On 27 August 2012, Bowen reunited with Happy Daft Farm co-presenter Sally Naden for a one-off show on the station.

Bowen returned to radio in 2009, presenting a mid-morning radio show on 106.6 Indigo FM in Cumbria.

In 2005, Bowen performed a solo show at the Edinburgh Festival Fringe about Bullseye, called "You Can't Beat a Bit of Bully". He returned to Edinburgh in 2006 performing at Jongleurs from 8–28 August.

== Personal life ==
In 1959, Bowen married his colleague Phyllis (née Owen). She supported him throughout his career, driving him to shows, and was by his bedside when he died. The couple lived at Melling-with-Wrayton near Lancaster. They had two children. Bowen was a supporter of Blackburn Rovers Football Club.

He was instantly recognised in both his home area and when travelling to venues with the personalised number plates J80 WEN, which adorned several of his cars until he sold it in 2016.

Bowen previously owned Arkholme for Kirkby Lonsdale railway station, on what is now the Leeds–Morecambe line between Wennington and Carnforth stations. He converted the main station building into a private dwelling.

== Health problems and death ==
Bowen smoked up to 80 cigarettes a day up until 1973. He suffered from emphysema in his later years.

In early 2011, it was announced that Bowen was recovering in the Royal Lancaster Infirmary, after having suffered two mild strokes. He had suffered the first stroke on 18 February and the second while in hospital. Before his two strokes, Bowen performed on cruise liners and gave corporate after-dinner speeches. By 2012, he was recovering and regaining some mobility once more, and even started performing his stage show "You Can't Beat a Bit of Bully", but suffered a third stroke in November 2014, which left him struggling to walk and talk. He died at Royal Lancaster Infirmary on 14 March 2018, aged 80.

== Stand-up DVDs ==
- Live (15 March 1993)
- You Can't Tell These Anymore! (1 December 2003)

== Notes ==
Preceded by None	Host of Bullseye; 1981–1995	Succeeded by Dave Spikey
