= Wray railway station =

Former station in Lancashire, England

Wray
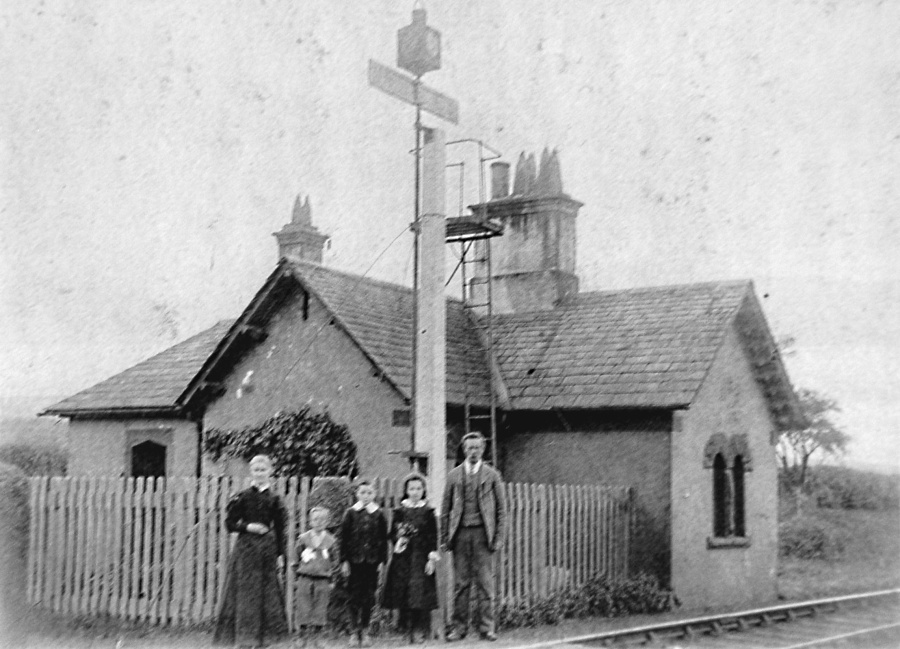
- Wray Crossing, 1901

General information
- Location: Wray, Lancaster, Lancashire; England
- Coordinates: 54.10885°N 2.61790°W
- Platforms: 0

Other information
- Status: Disused

History
- Original company: "Little" North Western Railway

Key dates
- 17 November 1849: Opened
- 10 August 1850: Closed
- 3 January 1966: Line closed between Wennington and Morecambe to passengers
- 5 June 1967: Line closed between Wennington and Morecambe to freight
Location
- Location within the City of Lancaster district Location within Lancashire

Wray railway station was a short-lived station near the village of Wray in the City of Lancaster district of Lancashire, England. The station was opened on a temporary basis by the "Little" North Western Railway on their route between Skipton and Lancaster, and was closed after just ten months of operation in the summer of 1850. The station was a single-building cottage and was administered by John Bee until 1891.

The line remained in use until closure to passengers in 1966 between Wennington and Morecambe Promenade. Freight services finished the following year in 1967 and the track was subsequently dismantled. The old formation has since been returned to agricultural land. The course of the route can still be followed from nearby roads and on satellite images, with several overbridges still standing.

| Preceding station | Disused railways | Following station |
|---|---|---|
| Wennington | Midland Railway "Little" North Western Railway | Hornby |
