= Wennington Junction rail crash =

Railway crash at Wennington, Lancashire, England

- Accident at Wennington, near Lancaster, to a Midland Railway Train (The Illustrated London News, August 1880)

Details
- Date: 11 August 1880
- Location: Wennington, Lancashire
- Coordinates: 54.123°N 2.590°W
- Country: England
- Line: Leeds to Morecambe Line
- Cause: Excessive speed over junction

Statistics
- Trains: 1
- Deaths: 8
- Injured: 23

Just west of Wennington railway station was Wennington junction where the Furness and Midland Joint Railway left the North Western section of the Midland Railway. On 11 August 1880 the 12:15 Leeds to Lancaster train completely derailed at the junction points then continued for 166 yards (152 m) before striking the abutment of a bridge.

The junction had no super-elevation as continuous crossing timbers were in use thus reducing the safe speed, and the Midland Railway were advised to correct this. But the inquiry also found the braking power of the train to be grossly inadequate; the train should have been able to stop before reaching the bridge. Only the locomotive was fitted with a Westinghouse brake and there was only one brake van on the train. Although the Midland Railway was fitting continuous brakes to its passenger trains the enquiry pointed out that such a recommendation had been made twenty years previously and the actions had still not been completed.

== Sources ==
- Rolt, L.T.C.; Kichenside, Geoffrey (1982) [1955]. Red for Danger (4th ed.). Newton Abbot: David & Charles. pp. 164–165. ISBN 0-7153-8362-0.
