= Claughton Hall =

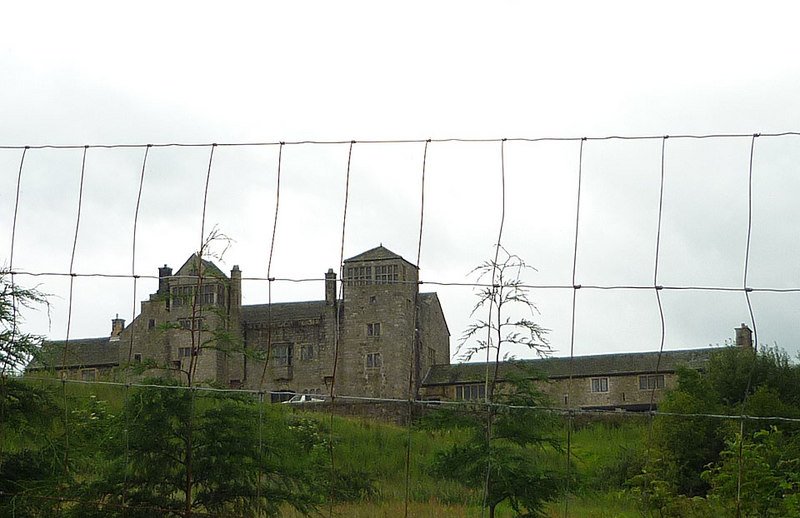
- The building in 2011

- Location within Lancashire

General information
- Type: Country house
- Location: Claughton, Lancashire, England
- Coordinates: 54.088724°N 2.655216°W
- Opening: c. 1600

Technical details
- Material: Sandstone

Listed Building – Grade I
- Designated: 4 October 1967
- Reference no.: 1071676

Claughton Hall (Claughton pronounced /ˈklæftən/ KLAF-tən) is a large country house in the English village of Claughton, Lancashire. A Grade I listed building, it dates to around 1600, but it contains material believed to be from the 15th century.

The building was moved to its present site, from the bottom of the hill on which it sits, in 1932–35. It is built in sandstone with stone-slate roofs. At each end of the north front are tall projecting towers; the left tower is gabled, and the right tower has a hipped roof. In the top storey of both towers are continuous mullioned and transomed windows. The recessed section between them contains two chimneys on corbels, and a doorway flanked by three-light windows, and with an oriel window above.

It was the former home of ex Blackpool F.C. owner Owen Oyston between 1970 and 1996. The property is now owned by his ex-wife Vicki Oyston, and is the home of her grandson, Sam Oyston. Owen Oyston was found guilty of raping a 16-year-old girl at the property in 1996.

== See also ==
- Listed buildings in Claughton, Lancaster
