= Melling railway station (Lancashire) =

Disused station in England

Melling

General information
- Location: Melling, Lancashire; England
- Coordinates: 54.1352°N 2.6152°W
- Grid reference: SD599712
- Platforms: 2

Other information
- Status: Disused

History
- Original company: Furness and Midland Joint Railway
- Pre-grouping: Furness and Midland Joint Railway
- Post-grouping: London, Midland and Scottish Railway

Key dates
- 6 June 1867: Opened
- 5 May 1952: Closed
Location
- Location within the City of Lancaster district Location within Lancashire

Melling railway station served the village of Melling, Lancashire, England, from 1867 to 1952 on the Furness and Midland Joint Railway.

== History ==
The station was opened on 6 June 1867 by the Furness and Midland Joint Railway on their line between Wennington and Carnforth. It was sited between the western portal of the 1230yd (1118m) Melling Tunnel and the bridge carrying the railway across the A683 Lancaster to Kirkby Lonsdale road.

It was closed on 5 May 1952 by the British Transport Commission due to low patronage. Though most of the structures were subsequently demolished, the station house is still extant and is used as a holiday cottage, whilst the former goods yard is used as commercial premises. The line passing through also remains operational, as part of the Leeds to Morecambe Line.

Preceding station	Historical railways	Following station
Wennington; Line and station open	Furness and Midland Joint Railway	Arkholme for Kirkby Lonsdale; Line open, station closed
