= Hornby railway station =

Former station in Lancashire, England

Hornby
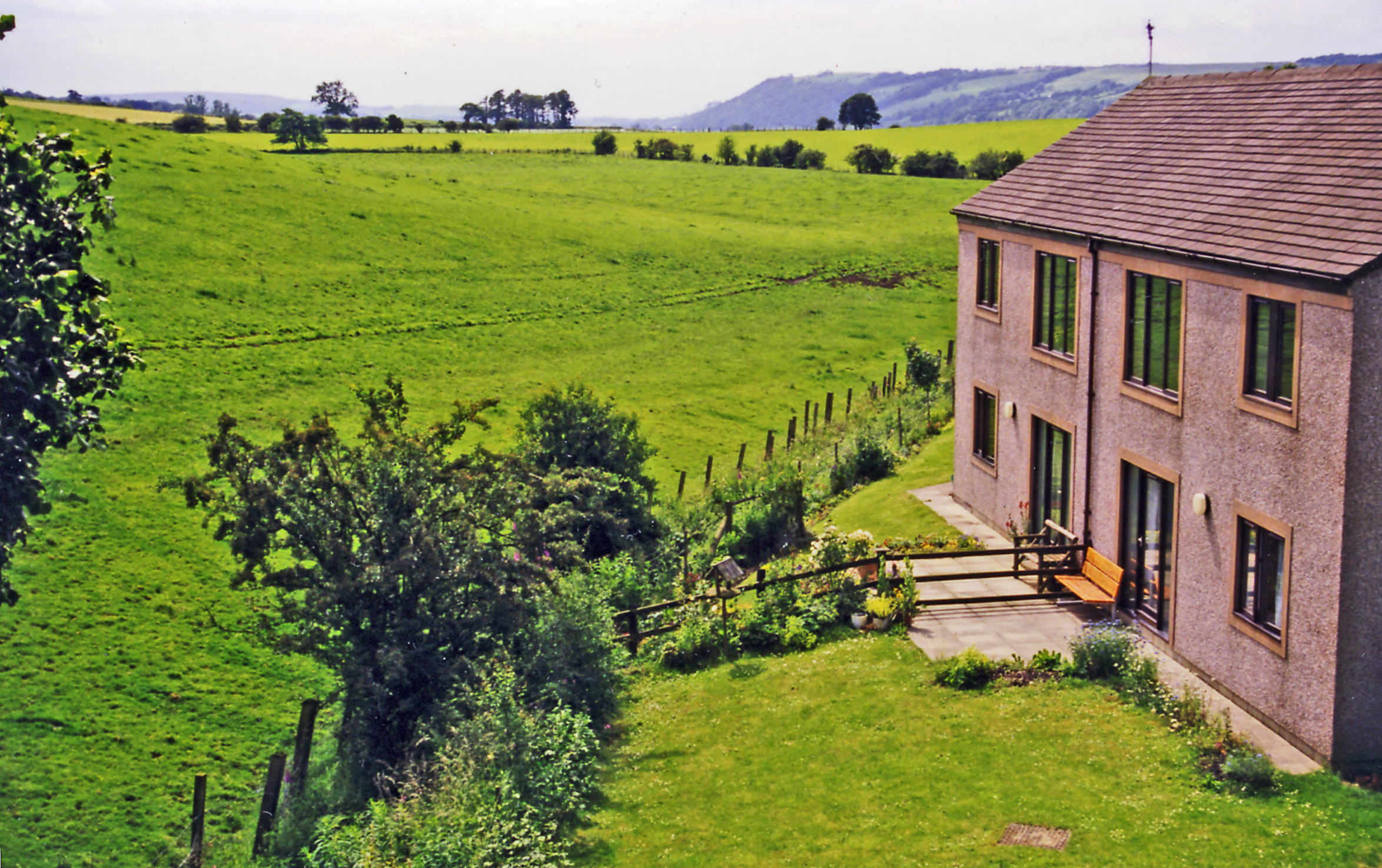
- The site of the station in 1998

General information
- Location: Hornby, Lancaster, Lancashire; England
- Coordinates: 54.1065°N 2.6353°W
- Platforms: 2

Other information
- Status: Disused

History
- Original company: "Little" North Western Railway
- Pre-grouping: Midland Railway
- Post-grouping: London, Midland and Scottish Railway

Key dates
- 17 November 1849: Opened
- 16 September 1957: Closed
- 3 January 1966: Line closed between Wennington and Morecambe to passengers
- 5 June 1967: Line closed between Wennington and Morecambe to freight
Location
- Location within the City of Lancaster district Location within Lancashire

Hornby railway station served the village of Hornby in the City of Lancaster district of Lancashire, England.

The station was located in a cutting off Station Road and was constructed by the "Little" North Western Railway' opening with the line in November 1849 (though through traffic towards Skipton and beyond didn't commence until the following summer). The line eastwards towards Wennington was doubled soon after opening but westwards to Lancaster, it remained single track until 1889.

It was closed to passenger traffic in September 1957 by the British Transport Commission due to declining usage. The line remained in use until closure to passengers in January 1966 between Wennington and Morecambe.

Freight services finished the following year in June 1967 and the line was later dismantled. Much of the route has since been returned to agricultural use. The station site is now occupied by a housing development, though the formation either side can still be traced.

Preceding station	Disused railways	Following station
Wray	Midland Railway "Little" North Western Railway	Claughton
