= Arkholme for Kirkby Lonsdale railway station =

Disused station in Lancashire, England

Coordinates: 54.14740°N 2.63518°W

Arkholme for Kirkby Lonsdale
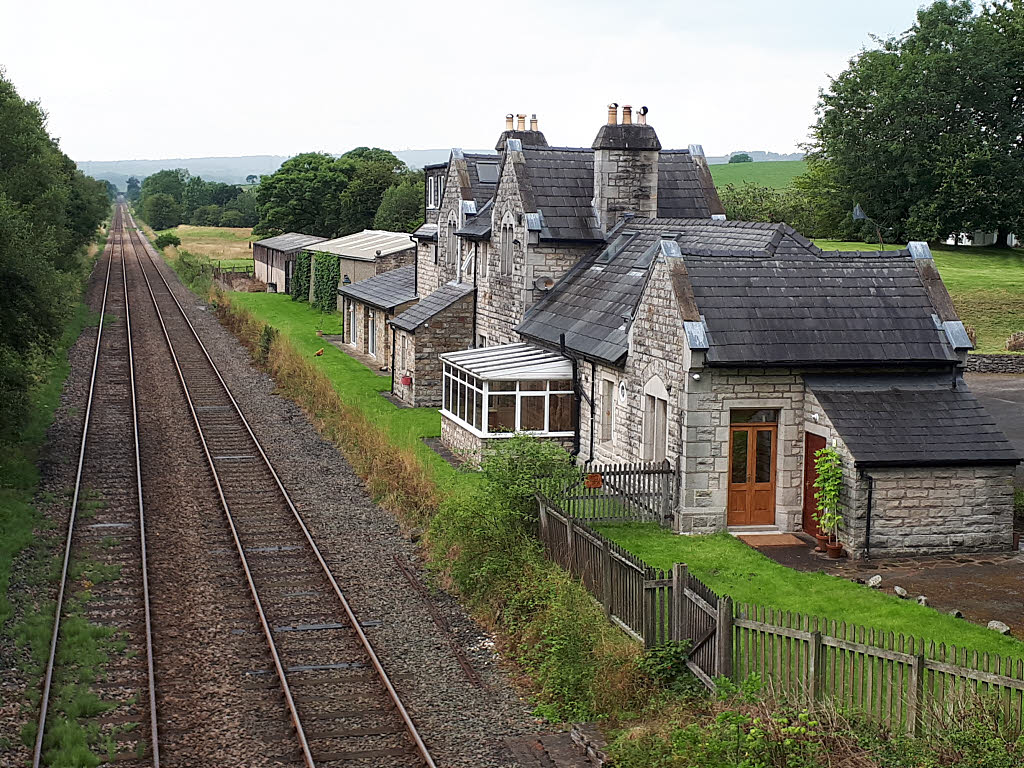
- Former station buildings, now a private dwelling

General information
- Location: Arkholme-with-Cawood, Lancaster; England
- Platforms: 2

Other information
- Status: Disused

History
- Original company: Furness and Midland Joint Railway
- Pre-grouping: Furness and Midland Joint Railway
- Post-grouping: London, Midland and Scottish Railway

Key dates
- 6 June 1867: Station opens as Arkholme
- 1 December 1869: Station renamed Arkholme for Kirkby Lonsdale
- 12 September 1960: Closed to passengers
Location
- Location within the City of Lancaster district Location within Lancashire

Arkholme for Kirkby Lonsdale railway station served the village of Arkholme in Lancashire, England. It is situated on what is now the Leeds–Morecambe line between the current Wennington and Carnforth stations.

== History ==
Opened by the Furness and Midland Joint Railway in 1867, then run by the Midland Railway, it became part of the London, Midland and Scottish Railway during the Grouping of 1923. The station then passed on to the London Midland Region of British Railways on nationalisation in 1948. It was closed by the British Transport Commission on 12 September 1960 when the local stopping service between Wennington & Carnforth was withdrawn.

== Preservation ==
The station building was converted to a private dwelling after closure. It was once owned by comedian and television personality Jim Bowen and has featured on the TV programme Through the Keyhole.

== Notes ==
=== Sources ===
- Butt, R. V. J. (October 1995). The Directory of Railway Stations: details every public and private passenger station, halt, platform and stopping place, past and present (1st ed.). Sparkford: Patrick Stephens Ltd. ISBN 978-1-85260-508-7. OCLC 60251199. OL 11956311M.
- Jowett, Alan (March 1989). Jowett's Railway Atlas of Great Britain and Ireland: From Pre-Grouping to the Present Day (1st ed.). Sparkford: Patrick Stephens Ltd. ISBN 978-1-85260-086-0. OCLC 22311137.
- Jowett, Alan (2000). Jowett's Nationalised Railway Atlas (1st ed.). Penryn, Cornwall: Atlantic Transport Publishers. ISBN 978-0-906899-99-1. OCLC 228266687.
- Station on navigable O.S. map

Preceding station	Historical railways	Following station
Melling	Furness and Midland Joint Railway	Borwick
