= Melling-with-Wrayton =

Civil parish in the City of Lancaster, Lancashire, England

Coordinates: 54.135°N 2.618°W

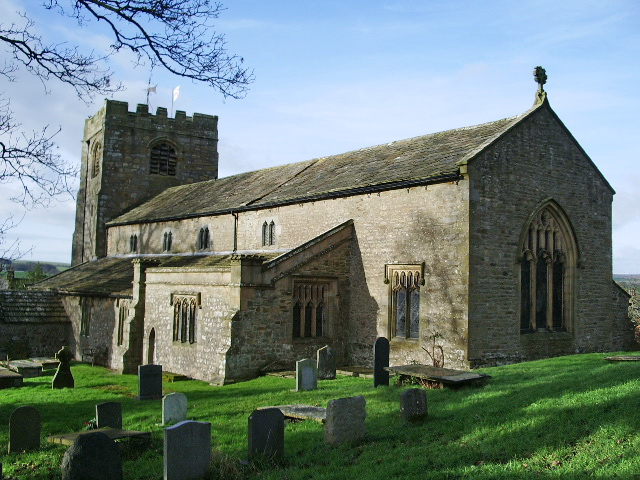
- St Wilfred's Church

- Location in the City of Lancaster district Location within Lancashire
- Population: 304 (2011)
- OS grid reference: SD597712
- Civil parish: Melling-with-Wrayton
- District: Lancaster
- Shire county: Lancashire
- Region: North West
- Country: England
- Sovereign state: United Kingdom
- Post town: CARNFORTH
- Postcode district: LA6
- Dialling code: 015242
- Police: Lancashire
- Fire: Lancashire
- Ambulance: North West
- UK Parliament: Morecambe and Lunesdale

Melling-with-Wrayton is a civil parish in the City of Lancaster in the English county of Lancashire. It includes the village of Melling and the hamlet of Wrayton, to the northeast. The parish had a population of 290 recorded in the 2001 census, increasing slightly to 299 at the 2011 census.

Melling forms part of a cluster of sites along the Lune Valley – the densest distribution of Norman castles outside the Welsh border countryside. Each has evidence of a motte – as with Arkholme and Whittington – but Melling has no surviving bailey.

== Railway lines ==
Until 1952 Melling railway station was served by the Furness and Midland Joint Railway. The line continues in use for through traffic, although stopping trains ended on the branch in 1960. To the south-east, a tunnel takes the line to Wennington, where it connects to the Midland Railway; in the opposite direction, the next station was Arkholme. The line is now used by trains travelling between Morecambe/Lancaster and Leeds, as the Midland Railway between Lancaster and Wennington closed in 1966.

== Geographical and architectural features ==
On the edge of the first terrace 6m above the flood plain – and within St Wilfrid's vicarage garden – the motte at Melling is located centrally in the village, some distance from the present course of the river. The mound has been damaged by landscaping activities, but former channels of the varied course of the Lune can still be detected – on the Melling side of the plain.

Locally attributed as "The Cathedral of the Lune Valley", the Grade I listed St Wilfrid's Church, with a belfry of six bells appears, originally, to have formed the manorial chapel within the, now missing, castle bailey.

== See also ==
- Listed buildings in Melling-with-Wrayton
