= Claughton, Lancaster =

Village and parish in Lancashire, England

Claughton
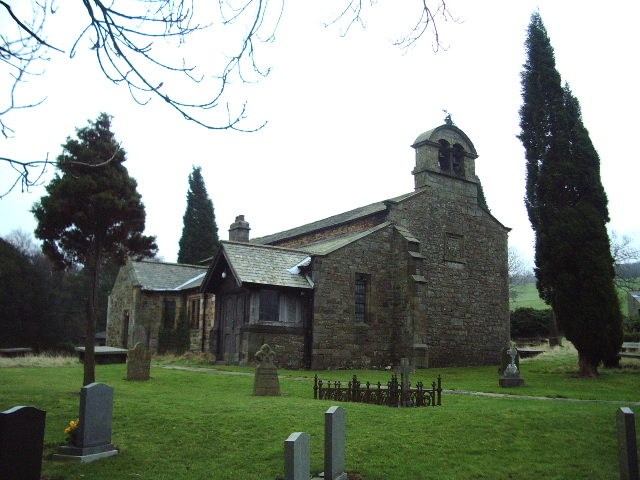
- St Chad's Church, Claughton, now redundant

- Location in the City of Lancaster district Location in the Forest of Bowland Location within Lancashire
- Population: 199 (2021)
- OS grid reference: SD562664
- Civil parish: Claughton
- District: Lancaster
- Shire county: Lancashire
- Region: North West
- Country: England
- Sovereign state: United Kingdom
- Post town: LANCASTER
- Postcode district: LA2
- Dialling code: 01524
- Police: Lancashire
- Fire: Lancashire
- Ambulance: North West
- UK Parliament: Lancaster and Fleetwood

Claughton (/ˈklæftən/ KLAF-tən) is a small village and civil parish in the City of Lancaster in Lancashire, England. The village is on the A683 road east of Lancaster and at the time of the 2001 census had a population of 132. In the 2011 census Claughton was grouped with Roeburndale (2001 pop. 76) to give a total of 223. In the 2021 census, it had a population of 199.

North of the village is the River Lune, and to the south is Claughton Moor and the fells of the Forest of Bowland.

== Local government ==
Claughton is part of the Lower Lune Valley ward, which elects two councillors to Lancaster City Council every four years.

== Industry ==
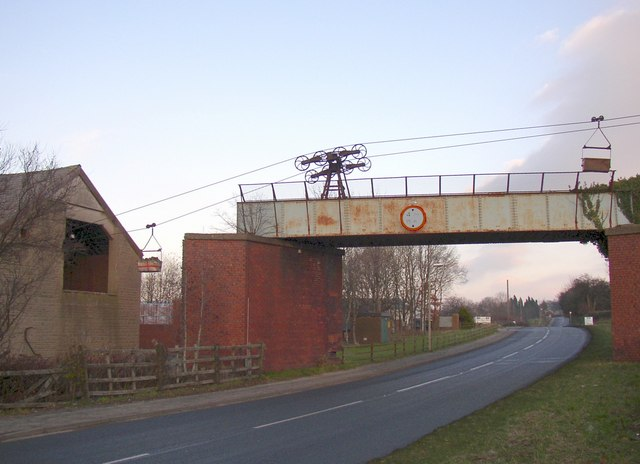
Claughton Brickworks ropeway conveyors suspended above the road (A683).

There is a brickworks, Claughton Brickworks, in the village. Ropeway conveyors, which transport clay from Claughton Moor to the Claughton Brickworks, are suspended above the road (A683).

== Religious sites ==
St Chad's Church was closed by the Church of England in 2002 due to a decline in the number of worshippers and the fact that the building was in need of modernisation. The church was part of the Hornby with Claughton parish. There was a church on the site as early as 1100.

== Railway ==
The railway station (actually a crossing cottage) was on the "Little" North Western Railway at 54°05′43.47″N 2°40′2.15″W. Trains running between Lancaster Green Ayre railway station and Wennington railway station stopped at Claughton between Caton and Hornby. In 1853, for example, the 11am from Morecambe to Skipton called at Claughton at 11.35.

== See also ==
- Listed buildings in Claughton, Lancaster
