= Borwick railway station =

Disused station in Lancashire, England

Borwick
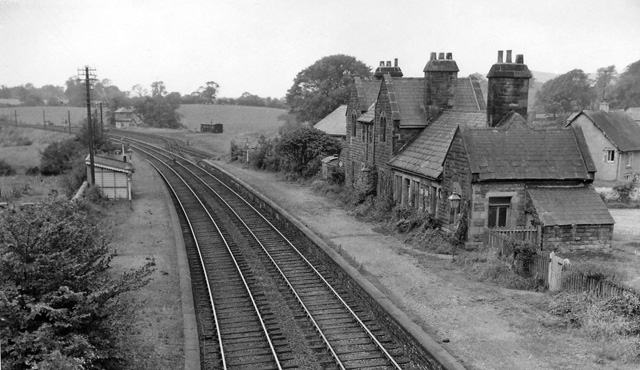
- Borwick station in September 1962, 2 years after closure.

General information
- Location: Borwick, Lancaster; England
- Coordinates: 54.1497°N 2.7106°W
- Grid reference: SD537729
- Platforms: 2

Other information
- Status: Disused

History
- Original company: Furness and Midland Joint Railway
- Pre-grouping: Furness and Midland Joint Railway
- Post-grouping: London, Midland and Scottish Railway

Key dates
- 6 June 1867: Opened
- 12 September 1960: Closed
Location
- Location within the City of Lancaster district Location within Lancashire

Borwick railway station formerly served the village of Borwick in Lancashire, England. It was located on the Furness and Midland Joint Railway line between Carnforth and Wennington, 3 miles (5 km) east of Carnforth Joint station.

== History ==
The station was opened in June 1867, when passenger services began operating over the line. Whilst it was jointly owned by the two constituent companies, the station was run by the Midland Railway who also operated all the trains that served it (the Furness Railway was responsible for the upkeep of the permanent way and associated structures on the line). Facilities at the station were modest, with the main buildings on the northern (eastbound) platform and a shelter on the westbound side. It also had a signal box and small goods yard at its western end. Passenger services from the station initially ran to a temporary station at Carnforth next to the junction between the Joint line and the Furness line proper towards Barrow, but began using the main line station in 1880.

The station is the second to be built, the original being built before the railway which, when it arrived, passed 50 yards to the south east.

Along with its neighbours further east, the station was served mainly by local trains between Wennington and Carnforth - the 1912 passenger timetable listed six departures in each direction each weekday and this level of service was maintained for most of the station's life (although it did drop to as low as two per day during the First World War and again in the early 1940s).

The station passed into the control of the London, Midland and Scottish Railway at the 1923 Grouping and then to British Railways at nationalisation in 1948. It was then closed by the British Transport Commission on 12 September 1960 (along with neighbouring Arkholme) when the local service between Wennington and Carnforth ceased.

== The site today ==
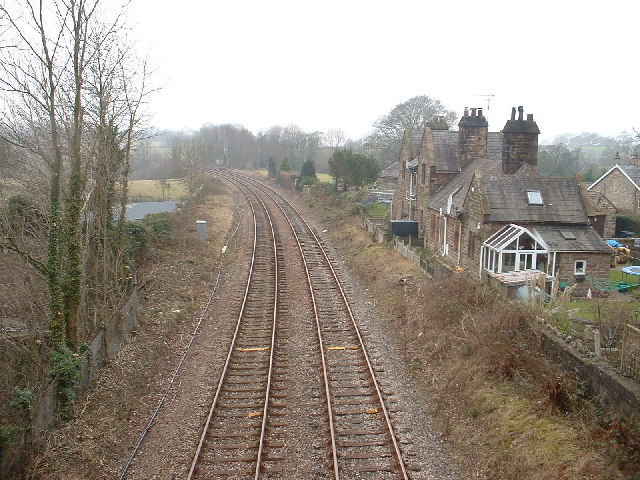
Borwick station house in 2006

The old station house still exists to this day, having been converted into a private residence after closure. Portions of the old platforms also survive, albeit derelict and heavily overgrown but the rest of the station has been demolished. The route meanwhile is still operational as part of the Leeds to Morecambe Line.

== Notes ==
Preceding station	Historical railways	Following station
Arkholme	Furness and Midland Joint Railway	Carnforth
