= Scale Hall railway station =

Former station in Lancashire, England

Scale Hall

General information
- Location: Lancaster, City of Lancaster, Lancashire; England
- Coordinates: 54.0555°N 2.8154°W
- Platforms: 2

Other information
- Status: Disused

History
- Post-grouping: British Railways

Key dates
- 8 June 1957: Opened
- 3 January 1966: Closed
Location
- Location within Lancaster Location within the City of Lancaster district Location within Lancashire

Scale Hall railway station served the suburb of Scale Hall in Lancaster, Lancashire, England.

The station was located near Scale Hall Lane on Morecambe Road. The station opened in 1957 and closed to passengers in 1966 with the line between Lancaster Green Ayre, and Morecambe Promenade.

The line has since been converted into a footpath. The station has been demolished.

Preceding station	Disused railways	Following station
Lancaster Green Ayre	British Railways	Morecambe Promenade
