= Morecambe Harbour railway station =

Disused station in Lancashire, England

Morecambe Harbour
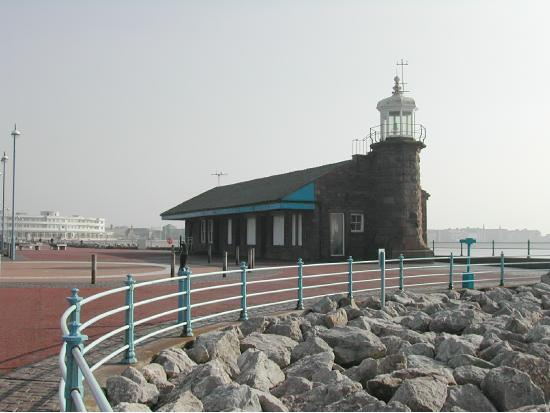
- The former station building

General information
- Location: Morecambe, City of Lancaster, Lancashire; England
- Coordinates: 54.0746°N 2.8784°W
- Platforms: 1

Other information
- Status: Disused

History
- Original company: Morecambe Harbour and Railway
- Pre-grouping: Midland Railway

Key dates
- 12 June 1848: Opened as "Morecambe Pier"
- 15 December 1854: Renamed "Morecambe Harbour"
- 1 September 1904: Closed
Location
- Location within Morecambe Location within the City of Lancaster district Location within Lancashire

Morecambe Harbour railway station was on the "little" North Western Railway's Morecambe Harbour and Railway in Morecambe, Lancashire, England. It was opened in 1848 and closed in 1904. The line remained open to serve the harbour until an unknown date. Today the station building still exists as a cafe.

Preceding station	Disused railways	Following station
Morecambe (Northumberland Street); Line and station closed	Midland Railway; Morecambe Harbour and Railway	Terminus
