= Low Bentham railway station =

Short-lived railway station in Low Bentham North Yorkshire, England

Low Bentham

General information
- Location: Low Bentham, North Yorkshire; England
- Coordinates: 54.118°N 2.535°W
- Platforms: 2

Other information
- Status: Disused

History
- Original company: "Little" North Western Railway
- Pre-grouping: "Little" North Western Railway

Key dates
- 1 June 1850: Opened
- 4 August 1853: Closed
Location

Low Bentham railway station served the village of Low Bentham, North Yorkshire, England, from 1850 to 1853 on the "Little" North Western Railway.

== History ==
The station was opened for public use on 1 June 1850 by the "Little" North Western Railway, although it opened earlier for market days only. It was a short-lived railway station, disappearing from the timetables in July 1853 but closed officially on 4 August 1853.

The Leeds to Morecambe Line still passes through the site, though no trace of the station itself remains.

Preceding station	Historical railways	Following station
Wennington; Line and station open	"Little" North Western Railway	High Bentham; Line and station open
