= Indigo FM =

- England
- Broadcast area: South Lakes and north Lancashire
- Frequency: 106.6 FM

History
- First air date: March 2008
- Last air date: January 2015

Links
- Website: Indigo FM website

Indigo FM was a radio station broadcasting to the south Lakes and north Lancashire area in the United Kingdom.

== History ==
Indigo FM first went on air in March 2008 following a successful application for a 5-year broadcast licence from media watchdog Ofcom. The station broadcast on 106.6 FM. Indigo FM aimed to be a truly local community radio station for the South Lakes/North Lancashire area with local presenters, local business involvement and sponsorship and the daily promotion of local 'what's ons', charity and volunteer events. The station closed in January 2015.

== Broadcast area ==
The coverage area for Indigo FM included towns and villages in the South Lakes, North Lancashire & North Yorkshire area including: Kirkby Lonsdale, Ingleton, Sedbergh, Casterton, Barbon, Clapham, Bentham and Caton.

== Presenters ==
Presenters on the station included former BBC Radio Lancashire and Bullseye personality, Jim Bowen. Jim lived close to the Indigo FM studios and knew the area well. James Mulville (former Lakeland Radio evening, Saturday Sport and Sunday Breakfast presenter) fronted the Lunchtime Show on the station and Steven Bell (ex Lakeland Radio Drivetime presenter and Head of Music, now BBC Radio Cumbria) presented 'Hometime' between 4pm and 6pm.
