= Listed buildings in Claughton, Lancaster =

Claughton (/ˈklæftən/) is a civil parish in the Lancaster district of Lancashire, England. It contains nine listed buildings that are recorded in the National Heritage List for England. Of these, one is listed at Grade I, the highest of the three grades, one is at Grade II*, the middle grade, and the others are at Grade II, the lowest grade. The parish contains the village of Claughton, and is otherwise rural. Its major structure is Claughton Hall, a country house that was moved from its original site in the village to a more isolated position in 1932–35. The hall is listed, and the other listed buildings include a former wing of the hall that is now a farmhouse, other houses, a barn, a church, a cross base in the churchyard, and a milestone.

== Key ==
Grade	Criteria
I	Buildings of exceptional interest, sometimes considered to be internationally important
II*	Particularly important buildings of more than special interest
II	Buildings of national importance and special interest

== Buildings ==
Name and location	Photograph	Date	Notes	Grade
Cross base 54.09301°N 2.66403°W	—	Medieval	The cross base is in the churchyard of St Chad's Church to the south of the church. It is in sandstone and has a roughly square plan. The upper sides are chamfered, and there is a socket for a cross.	II
Claughton Hall; 54.08870°N 2.65501°W		c. 1600	A country house containing some 15th-century material, which was moved to its present site in 1932–33. It is built in sandstone with stone-slate roofs. At each end of the north front are tall projecting towers; the left tower is gabled, and the right tower has a hipped roof. In the top storey of both towers are continuous mullioned and transomed windows. The recessed section between them contains two chimneys on corbels, and a doorway flanked by three-light windows, and with an oriel window above.	I
Barn, Claughton Hall Farm; 54.09293°N 2.66378°W	—	c. 1600	The barn is in sandstone with a stone-slate roof, in two storeys, the lower floor being used as a shippon. It contains a doorway, windows of various sizes, some of which are blocked, and a ramp leading to the upper floor. Inside there is a blocked fireplace with a Tudor arched head.	II
Claughton Hall Farmhouse; 54.09276°N 2.66436°W	—	Late 16th to early 17th century	This is a wing of Claughton Hall left in situ when the rest of the hall was moved to a different site in the 1930s. It has two storeys, and consists of a main block and a projecting wing. The windows are mullioned. Above the doorway is a lintel inscribed with the date 1673 and initials, and a stone carved with a coat of arms.	II*
Shaw House; 54.09394°N 2.66401°W	—	1723 (probable)	The house is in sandstone with a slate roof, and is in two storeys. The original part has three bays containing mullioned windows and a doorway with an architrave, a pulvinated frieze, and a pediment. Above the doorway is an inscribed oval plaque. To the right is an additional bay with sash windows.	II
Holehouse; 54.08328°N 2.68351°W	—	Early 18th century	A sandstone house with a stone-slate roof, it has two storeys, a T-shaped plan, and a three-bay front. The windows have replaced mullions. The doorway has a moulded surround, and above one of the windows is a re-set inscribed lintel that was originally on a barn.	II
St Chad's Church; 54.09307°N 2.66413°W		1815	The church was built on the site of previous churches, and it was extensively restored and extended in 1904 by Austin and Paley. It is in sandstone with a slate roof, and consists of a nave and chancel without any division, a north aisle, porch, and vestry. On the west gable is a twin bellcote with an open segmental pediment. The church has been redundant since 2002.	II
Milestone; 54.09186°N 2.66836°W	—	Mid 19th century	The milestone is on the southeast side of the A683 road. It is in sandstone with a triangular plan and a sloping top. The top is inscribed "CLAUGHTON", and the sides are inscribed with the distances in miles to Lancaster, Hornby, Kirkby Lonsdale, and Ingleton.	II
Old Rectory; 54.09343°N 2.66405°W	—	Mid 19th century	Originally the rectory, and later used as a hotel, the building is in sandstone with a hipped slate roof. It has two storeys and an entrance front of three bays. In the centre is a gabled porch, and the doorway has a round head and an impost band. The windows are sashes.	II
