= Bentham railway station =

Railway station in North Yorkshire, England

Bentham
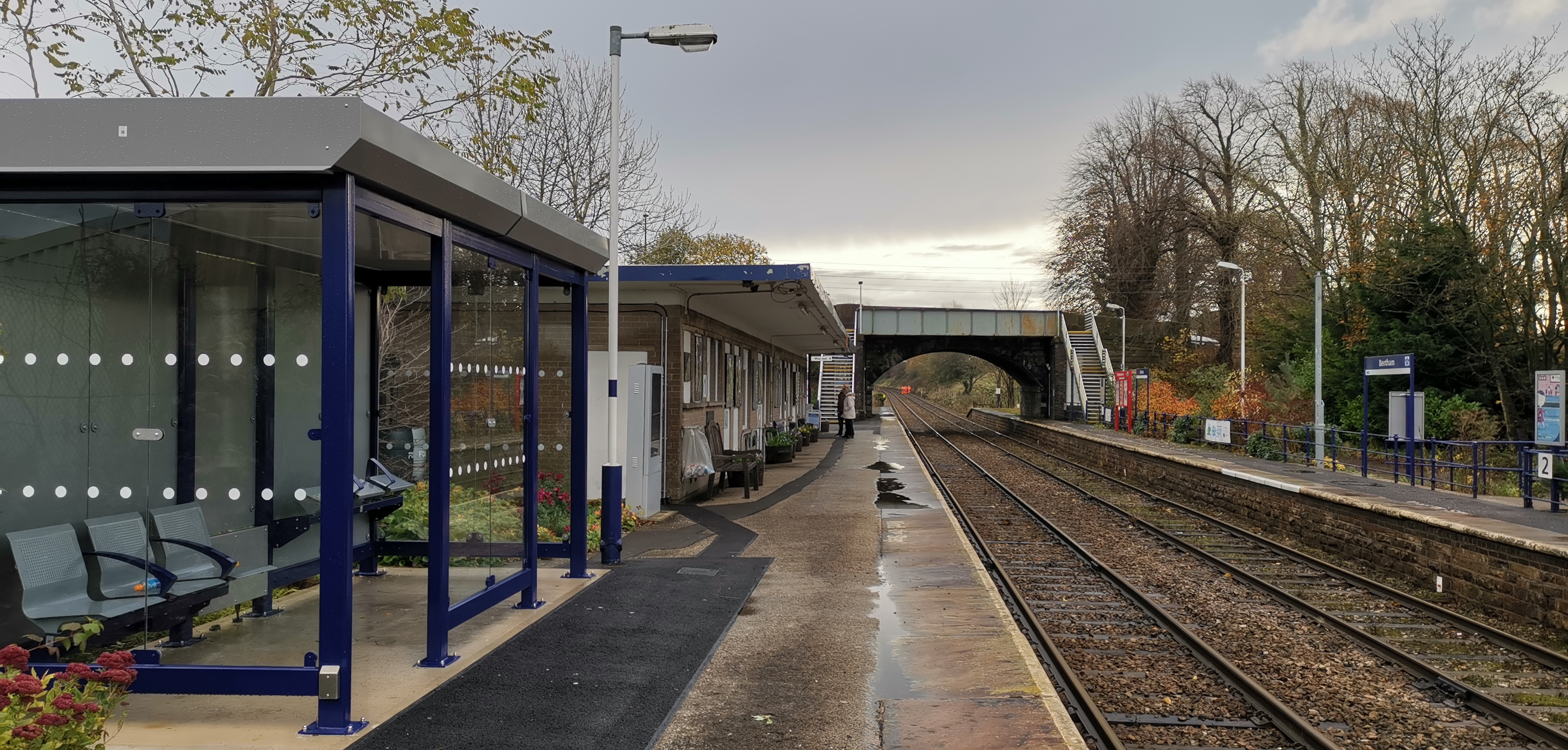

General information
- Location: High Bentham, North Yorkshire; England
- Coordinates: 54°06′56″N 2°30′38″W
- Grid reference: SD667689
- Owner: Network Rail
- Manager: Northern Trains
- Platforms: 2
- Tracks: 2

Other information
- Station code: BEN
- Classification: DfT category F2

History
- Original company: "Little" North Western Railway
- Pre-grouping: Midland Railway
- Post-grouping: London Midland and Scottish Railway; British Rail (London Midland Region)

Key dates
- 1 June 1850: Opened as Bentham
- 1 November 1851: Renamed Bentham High
- 1 May 1876: Renamed Bentham

Passengers
- 2021/22: ▲25,544
- 2022/23: ▲36,416
- 2023/24: ▲36,766
- 2024/25: ▲41,208
- 2025/26: ▲42,580
Location
- Location within North Yorkshire
Notes
- Passenger statistics from the Office of Rail and Road

Bentham is a railway station on the Bentham Line, which runs between Leeds and Morecambe via Skipton. The station, situated 19 miles (31 km) east of Lancaster, serves the town of High Bentham and surrounding settlements in North Yorkshire. It is owned by Network Rail and managed by Northern Trains.

== History ==
The station was opened as Bentham on 1 June 1850 by the "Little" North Western Railway, later taken over by the Midland Railway. On 1 November 1851, the station was renamed Bentham High, to avoid confusion with the nearby station at Low Bentham. That station was short-lived, and closed on 4 August 1853.

The station was provided with various facilities by the Midland Railway, including a signal box, water tower and column, goods shed and several sidings on the northern side of the line. These had all been removed by the early 1970s, with the signal box being the last to go in 1976.

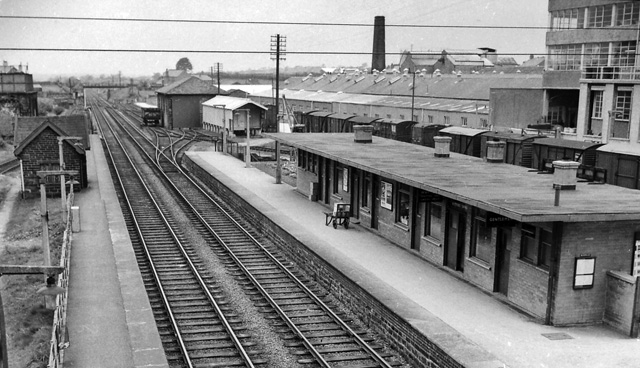
The station, photographed in September 1962.

The station building, which was constructed in the mid-1950s, after the original Midland structure was demolished by British Railways, is now privately owned. The station was reduced to unstaffed halt status in October 1970.

The station has had its own community volunteer support group, The Friends of Bentham Station, since September 2011. The group is based in the aforementioned building on the eastbound platform and has support from various local organisations, including the route's Rail User Group, Craven District Council and the Leeds, Lancaster and Morecambe Line Community Rail Partnership.

== Facilities ==
Timetable posters and digital information screens on both platforms provide train running information, whilst there are waiting shelters on each side. The stone shelter on the westbound platform was constructed by the Midland Railway, whereas its counterpart on the opposite platform is much more modern in comparison.

== Services ==
There are eight departures each way on weekdays and Saturdays (increased from seven at the start of the May 2019 timetable). Westbound, trains run to Lancaster and Morecambe (five trains only), whilst trains in the other direction run to Skipton and Leeds. Connections for Bradford Forster Square are available at Shipley, although through trains do operate occasionally if the line to Leeds is closed for engineering work (one service originates there in the early morning also on weekdays and Saturdays) in the Winter 2024 and spring 2025 timetables.

On Sundays, there are now five services in each direction throughout the year (all running to/from Morecambe since the winter 2019 timetable update). The alterations to give better journey opportunities for commuters to both Leeds and Lancaster (and additional Sunday services) were implemented at the May 2018 timetable change. Further station improvements are also planned, such as the installation of ticket machines, video help points and improved lighting.

In September 2019, a mudslide near Bentham disrupted service on the line.

== Sources ==
- Butt, R. V. J. (October 1995). The Directory of Railway Stations: details every public and private passenger station, halt, platform and stopping place, past and present (1st ed.). Sparkford: Patrick Stephens Ltd. ISBN 978-1-85260-508-7. OCLC 60251199. OL 11956311M.
- Bairstow, M. (2000). The 'Little' North Western Railway. Leeds: Martin Bairstow. ISBN 1-871944-21-X.
- Dewick, T. (2002). Complete Atlas of Railway Station Names. Hersham: Ian Allan Publishing. ISBN 0-7110-2798-6.

Preceding station	National Rail	Following station
Clapham (North Yorkshire)	Northern Trains; Bentham Line	Wennington
	Historical railways	
Clapham (North Yorkshire)	Midland Railway "Little" North Western Railway	Low Bentham
