= St Chad's Church, Claughton =

Coordinates: 54.0931°N 2.6641°W

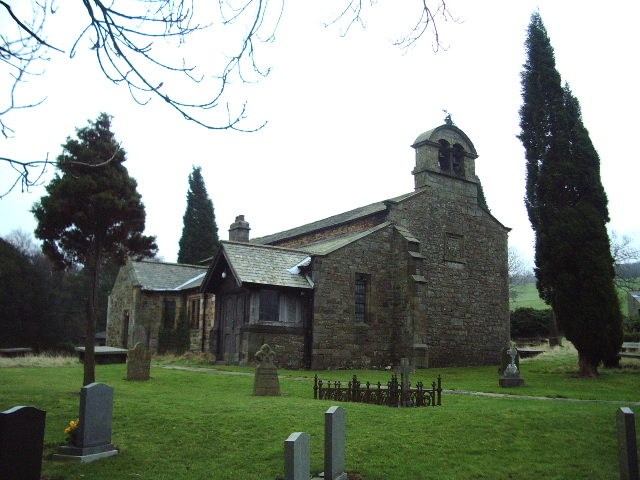
- St Chad's Church, Claughton, from the northwest

- Location in the City of Lancaster district
- OS grid reference: SD 567,666
- Location: Claughton, Lancashire
- Country: England
- Denomination: Anglican

History
- Status: Former parish church
- Founded: 1070
- Dedication: Saint Chad

Architecture
- Functional status: Redundant
- Heritage designation: Grade II
- Designated: 4 December 1985
- Architect(s): Austin and Paley (restoration and additions of 1904)
- Architectural type: Church
- Style: Gothic, Gothic Revival
- Completed: 1904

Specifications
- Length: 50 feet (15 m)
- Width: 26 feet (8 m)
- Materials: Sandstone, slate roof

St Chad's Church is in the village of Claughton, Lancashire, England. It is a redundant Anglican parish church, which is recorded in the National Heritage List for England as a designated Grade II listed building.

== History ==
The original church was built on the site in 1070, and the recorded list of its rectors goes back to 1230. The present church was built on the same site in 1815. In 1869 Hubert Austin designed new tracery for the east window. It cost £270 (equivalent to £35,000 in 2025), which also paid for the stained glass that was designed by Henry Holiday, and made by Heaton, Butler and Bayne. In 1904 Austin and Paley carried out work on the church, adding a north aisle, a porch, and buttresses, replacing the floor, removing the plaster ceiling, and providing new seating, a pulpit, and a lectern. This work cost about £900 (equivalent to £95,000). The church was declared redundant on 1 December 2002, due to a decline in the size of the congregation and because of the need for repairs.

== Architecture ==
St Chad's is constructed in sandstone rubble with a slate roof. It incorporates older fabric dating from about 1300 and from 1602. The plan consists of a nave and chancel in one cell, a north aisle, a north vestry, and a north porch. Along the side of the aisle are three two-light mullioned windows, with a single-light window in the angle with the vestry. On the south wall are three windows containing Perpendicular tracery. Between the nave and the chancel is a buttress. At the west end of the church is a single-light window with a trefoil head in the aisle, a buttress between the aisle and the nave and, in the nave wall, a carved panel containing the name W. Croft and the date 1602. The east window dates probably from about 1300 and has three lights with intersecting tracery and a pointed head. On the west gable is a double bellcote. One bell is said to be inscribed with the date 1296, making it the oldest bell in England. The other bell is dated 1727. Inside the church is a Perpendicular-style arcade dating from 1904, consisting of three semi-circular arches carried on round piers. The baluster font dates from the 18th or early 19th century.

== External features ==
In the churchyard to the south of the church is a medieval sandstone cross base with an empty socket. It is listed at Grade II.

== See also ==
- Listed buildings in Claughton, Lancaster
- List of ecclesiastical works by Austin and Paley (1895–1914)
