= Morecambe (Northumberland Street) railway station =

Former station in Lancashire, England

Morecambe (Northumberland Street)

General information
- Location: England
- Coordinates: 54.0704°N 2.8695°W
- Grid reference: SD428642
- Platforms: 2

Other information
- Status: Disused

History
- Pre-grouping: Midland Railway

Key dates
- 1848: Opened
- 1907: Closed
- ?: Full closure
Location
- Location within Morecambe Location within the City of Lancaster district Location within Lancashire

The first Morecambe railway station was located on Northumberland Street, in the seaside town of Morecambe, Lancashire, England.

== History ==
The station opened on 12 June 1848. It was expanded and the buildings were rebuilt in 1872. The line originally ran through to the stone jetty to connect with shipping, but Morecambe's shipping ceased with the growth of Heysham harbour, and the line then only served Ward's shipyard.

The station closed in March 1907 on the opening of a new Morecambe station that would later be known as Morecambe Promenade. The original station remained open for goods before closing at an unknown date.

After Morecambe Promenade station closed on 7 February 1994, a replacement Morecambe station was built on approximately the site of the old Northumberland Street station, opening on 29 May 1994.

A mural depicting the station is one of a series by Patricia Haskey and Graham Lowe which form the Poulton Village Art Trail.
