= Furness and Midland Joint Railway =

British railway company

Furness and Midland Railway Act 1863
- Act of Parliament
- Parliament of the United Kingdom
- Long title: An Act to empower the Furness Railway Company and the Midland Railway Company to construct a Railway to be called "The Furness and Midland Railway;" and for other Purposes.
- Citation: 26 & 27 Vict. c. lxxxii

Dates
- Royal assent: 22 June 1863

Text of statute as originally enacted

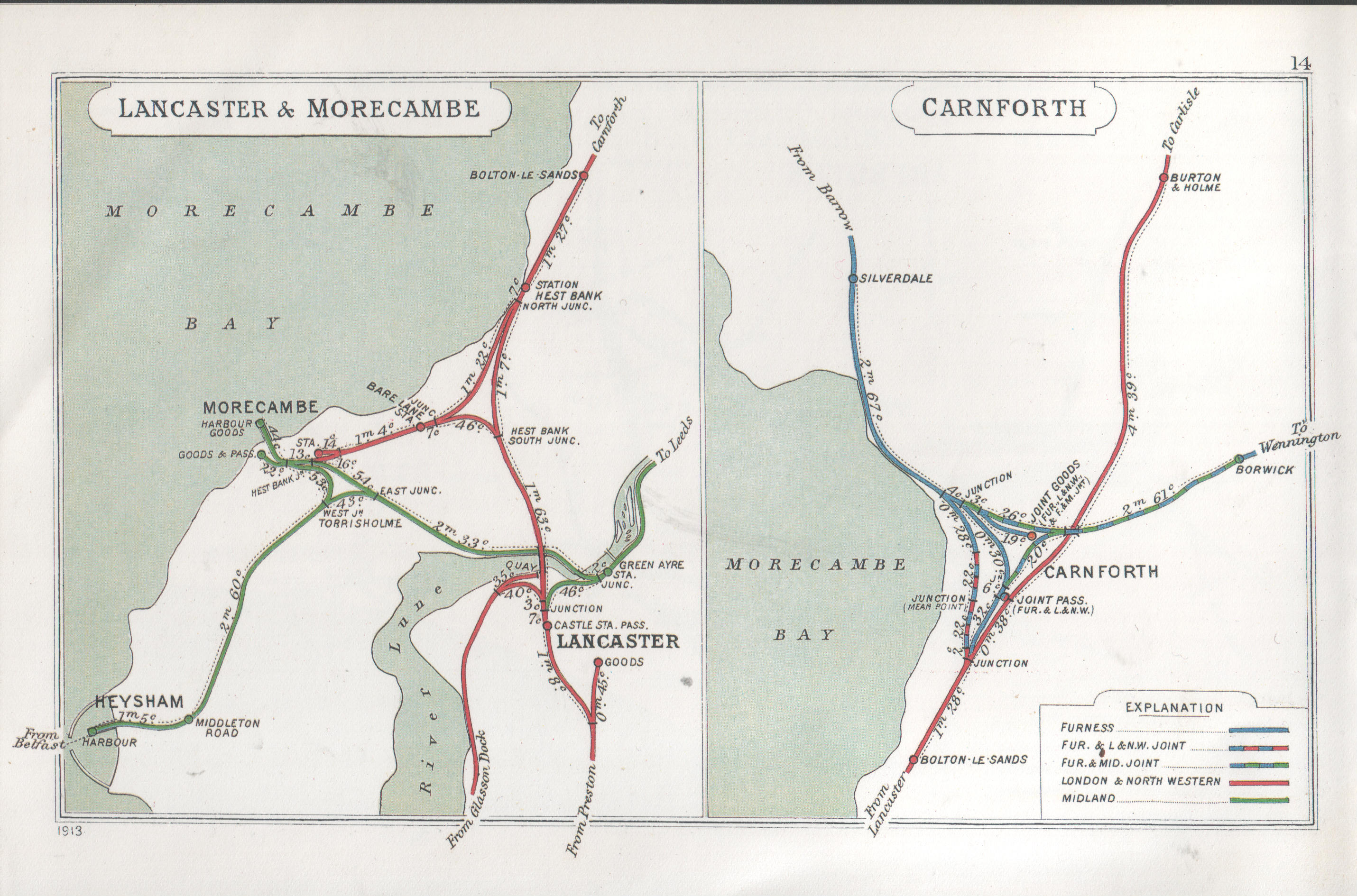
Railways around Carnforth in 1913

The Furness and Midland Joint Railway was a joint railway in England owned by the Furness Railway and the Midland Railway. Construction was agreed in 1862 for a line from Carnforth, on the Furness system, to Wennington, on the Midland Railway line from Yorkshire to Morecambe. Royal assent for the Furness and Midland Railway Act 1863 (26 & 27 Vict. c. lxxxii) was received in June 1863 and the contract for the route was let to Benton & Woodiwiss soon after at a cost of some £102,850.

== Opening and operation ==
The 9½ mile line opened in April 1867 for freight, with passengers services beginning on 6 June of that year. These initially ran to a temporary depot near Furness & Midland Junction where the two lines met, as the connecting curve to the main Carnforth Joint station was not completed until 1880. The two companies agreed from the outset, that the Midland would work all traffic over the line and operate the stations; whilst the Furness would maintain the track and structures from its Engineer's Office in Barrow. But as the Midland had their own "in-house" Signalling Department, the Midland installed and maintained the signalling on the line. Soon after opening, the Midland transferred its existing Irish & Isle of Man steamer services from Morecambe (where the harbour was prone to silting and difficult to reach at low tide) to the newly extended dock facilities at Piel Pier, near Barrow and began running connecting trains over the Joint line to serve it. The line also carried significant quantities of freight - mainly minerals from the Barrow area headed for West & South Yorkshire and worked by the F.R as far as the exchange yards at Carnforth, where Midland locos would take over. The Midland also built its own locomotive depot near Carnforth East Junction (some distance east of the station) to service the locos that worked the route - this still stands today, although it is no longer in railway use.

The boat trains were transferred to a new station adjacent to the deep water Ramsden Dock at Barrow-in-Furness in 1881 but would end altogether in 1904 when the Midland opened its new rail-served port at Heysham and moved its ferry routes there also. The line though remained a busy freight and passenger route right up until the 1923 Grouping (when the London Midland and Scottish Railway took over) and beyond.

== Stations and structures ==
Stations on the route were located at Melling, Arkholme and Borwick. Other notable structures include the 1,230-yard (1,120 m) Melling tunnel, a bridge over the Lancaster Canal at Capernwray and two viaducts near Arkholme, one of which takes the line across the River Lune.

== The line today ==
The line is still in use today as part of the Leeds to Morecambe Line, although there are no stops - Melling station was closed as an economy measure in 1952, whilst the other two suffered the same fate when the local stopping service over the line was withdrawn by the British Transport Commission in September 1960. All three station houses survive and are still used as private dwellings. Trains continue from Wennington to Leeds over former "little" North Western Railway metals. The original connection along the northern side of the triangular junction between the Joint line and the Furness Line at Carnforth was removed in 1998 after several years of disuse, meaning that any through trains using the route to reach destinations toward Barrow now have to reverse at Carnforth station.
