= Morecambe Promenade railway station =

Former railway station in Lancashire, England

Morecambe Promenade
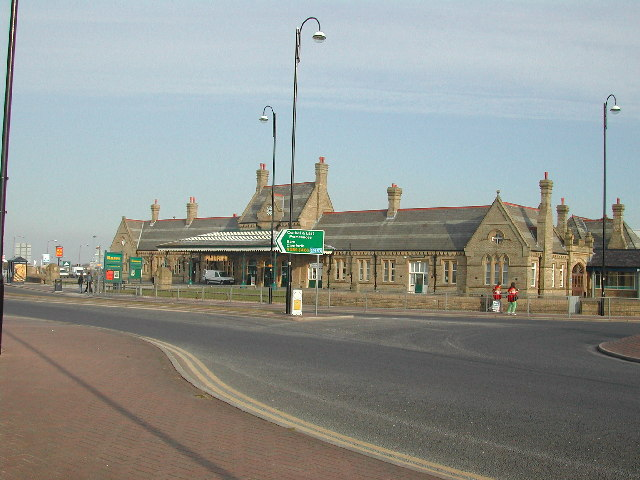

General information
- Location: Morecambe, City of Lancaster, England
- Coordinates: 54.0712°N 2.8747°W
- Grid reference: SD428642
- Platforms: 4

Other information
- Status: Disused

History
- Pre-grouping: Midland Railway
- Post-grouping: LMSR, London Midland Region (British Railways)

Key dates
- 24 March 1907: Opened as Morecambe
- 2 June 1924: Renamed Morecambe Promenade
- 6 May 1968: Renamed Morecambe
- 7 February 1994: Closed

Listed Building – Grade II
- Feature: Morecambe railway station main buildings
- Designated: 6 April 1979
- Reference no.: 1207224
Location
- Location within Morecambe Location within the City of Lancaster district Location within Lancashire

Morecambe Promenade was a railway station in Morecambe, Lancashire, England. It was opened on 24 March 1907 by the Midland Railway and closed in February 1994. After twelve weeks break in passenger service for the revision of track work and signalling, a new Morecambe station was opened on a site closer to the town centre.

The station opened as Morecambe and was renamed Morecambe Promenade in 1924. It reverted to its original name in 1968 and remained so until closure.

== History ==
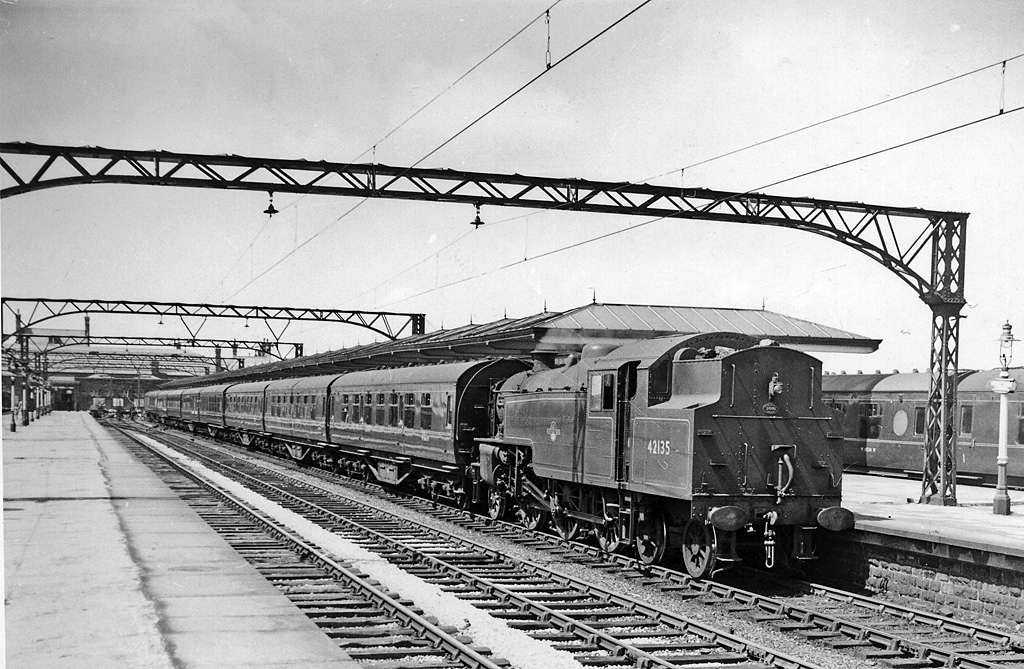
A steam-powered passenger train under the wires

Built by the Midland Railway Company as the terminus of the former "little" North Western Railway, the station first opened to passengers in 1907. It served as a replacement for the inadequate station on Northumberland Street, which was situated ironically on the site of the current two-platform Morecambe station.

Promenade station was built to cater for a large influx of passengers; to this effect, the station comprised four main platforms and a goods siding. When the station opened, there was some controversy over the segregation of passengers into 1st and 2nd class waiting rooms; many passengers disapproved of this and chose to wait instead in the station concourse.

The Midland Railway sought to exploit the potential of moving holidaymakers between Morecambe, Heysham and Lancaster and to provide a speedy and efficient service for workers at the then state-of-the-art 1905 port. The station was therefore constructed opposite the old Midland Hotel, enabling tourists arriving overnight by rail to stay in the hotel before taking the boat to the Isle of Man and Barrow from the Stone Jetty. Passengers using the facilities came from Leeds and Bradford, as well as the west coast of Scotland.

The Midland Railway electrified the recently opened branch line from Heysham Harbour to Morecambe Promenade on 13 April 1908 and the main line to Lancaster soon afterwards. The electrical power for the overhead lines was supplied from the company's power station at Heysham Harbour. Three new 3-car electric multiple units (EMUs) were purpose-built by the Midland at Derby to operate the service, which ran every 30 minutes throughout the day between the main LNWR station at Lancaster Castle and Heysham with reversals en route here and at Lancaster Green Ayre. The new trains proved to be popular with the public and also very reliable, with an availability rate of over 99% in the first 15 months of operation. These were maintained at the station.

With a fast and frequent electric local service and regular links to and from the West Riding of Yorkshire, it was no surprise that the station soon became very busy, especially in the summer; it handled significantly more traffic than its rival LNWR station at nearby Morecambe Euston Road. This tendency continued after World War I and the 1923 Grouping, when both lines into the resort came under the ownership of the London, Midland and Scottish Railway (LMS).

Under LMS control, the station was officially named Morecambe Promenade from 2 June 1924 and also began to handle some services travelling to the town over the ex-LNWR branch line from Hest Bank once again. These included notably the daily Northern Irish boat train from London Euston to Heysham (inaugurated in 1928) and various long-distance summer excursions from stations such as Manchester Victoria, Preston, Liverpool Exchange and Glasgow St Enoch. The volume of summer traffic to the resort was such though (thanks to the LMS company's continued promotion of Morecambe as a holiday destination) that Promenade was not able to handle all the traffic on offer and many trains still had to use Euston Road.

=== Post-war ===
Nationalisation of Grat Britain's railway network in 1948 saw British Railways take over control of the station and heralded an era of significant changes. The first of these came in February 1951, when the EMU sets were withdrawn and scrapped, after more than 40 years of service. Steam push-pull sets replaced them but electric working was reinstated in 1953, still at 6600 V AC and using the same infrastructure, but this time at a 50 Hz frequency. Three EMU sets built in 1914 and formerly used on the Willesden Junction to Earls Court route in London were brought in to run the service, and a fourth was added in 1957.

Another notable change occurred in September 1958, when the former LNWR terminus at Euston Road was closed to regular passenger traffic at the end of the summer timetable. The local services from Lancaster and Carnforth via Bare Lane henceforth followed the same route as the Irish Boat trains into Promenade, leaving Euston Road to be served only during the peak summer season between June and September until 1962. Summer traffic was by this time slowly declining (due to the rise in private car ownership and increasing availability of foreign package holidays), but there were still sufficient numbers visiting Morecambe in 1959 to require more than 20 scheduled and excursion trains to and from Euston Road and a similar number from Promenade.

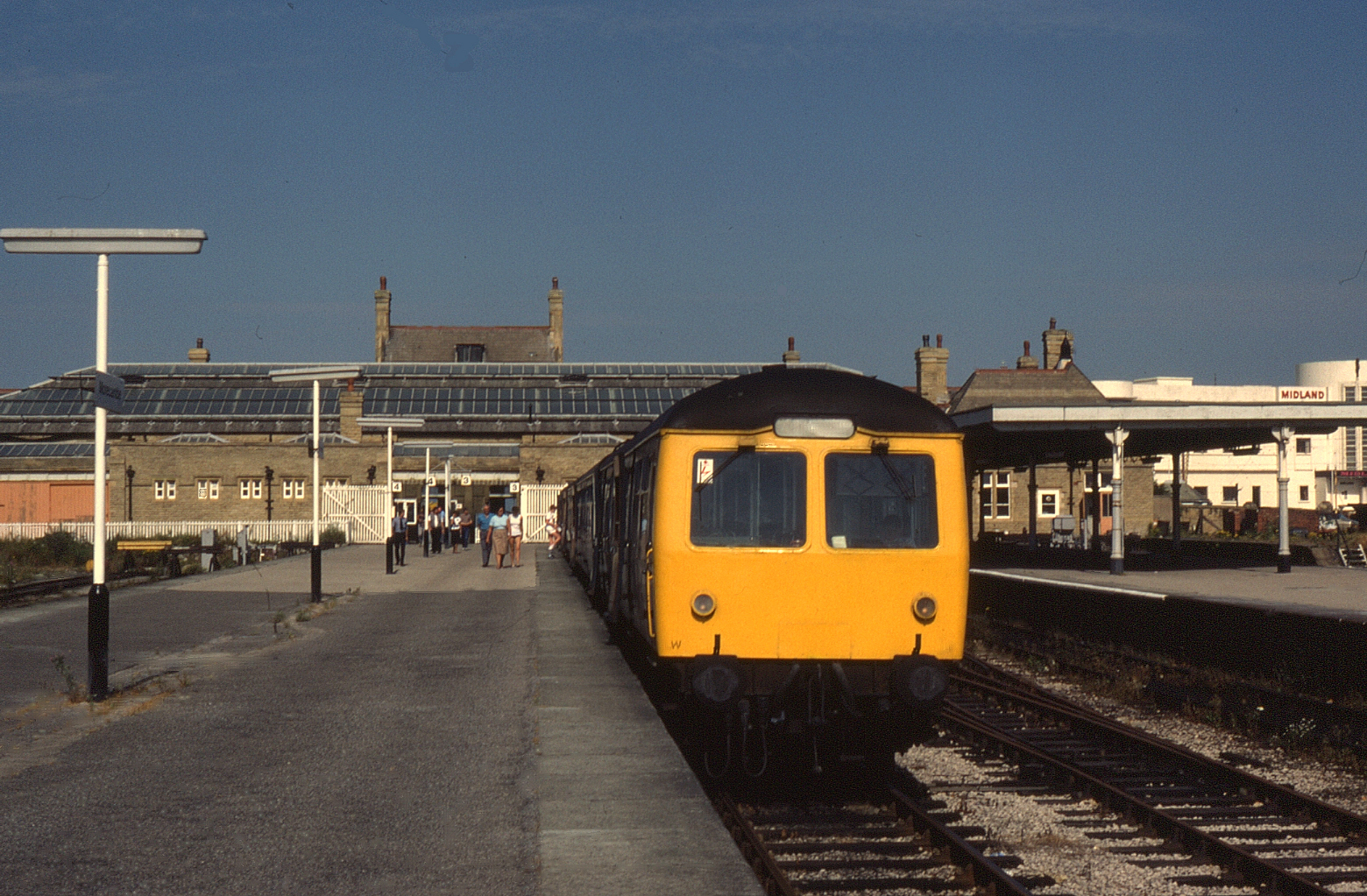
The station in 1984

By 1963 though, Euston Road closed completely and all services had been permanently diverted to Promenade station; the future was looking increasingly uncertain following the publication of the Beeching Report. The report's author, Richard Beeching - the chairman of the British Transport Commission - treated branch lines as irrelevant to the overall operation of inter-city rail networks, believing that car owners would drive to and park at main line stations before taking the train. One of the recommendations of his report was that service provision to Morecambe needed to be "modified", with one of the two routes eastwards closed and the remaining traffic concentrated on the other. Initially this was expected to be the ex-Midland line, but in the spring of 1964, it was announced that the former LNWR branch would be the one to be kept, even though the ex-Midland route was electrified and more heavily used.

As part of these plans, Promenade would be retained (at least in the short term) along with the branch to Heysham, but the former main line to Green Ayre and on to Wennington would be abandoned. The Leeds trains were to be re-routed via Carnforth and Hest Bank, and the existing DMU local service to Lancaster via Bare Lane would see an increase in frequency to compensate. The following year BR proposed to build a new south-to-east curve at Torrisholme that would allow direct running from Bare Lane towards Heysham without the need for reversal at Promenade, which would have been closed, and Euston Road would have reopened as the terminus for the branch services from Lancaster and Leeds. However, local opposition to the new curve (which required the demolition of property along its route) saw the scheme dropped and the original plans proceeded with.

Passenger services on the ex-Midland line through Green Ayre were duly withdrawn on and from 3 January 1966, along with most local trains to and from Heysham (though the boat trains from Manchester and London continued) and the overhead wires switched off. Thereafter, only the DMU-worked local shuttle to Lancaster via Bare Lane served the station, along with the rerouted services to and from Leeds via Carnforth and the few remaining summer excursions. Goods traffic continued for a further year on the Midland route but it was closed completely in June 1967 between Morecambe and Wennington, and subsequently dismantled. The overhead wires were removed from the Heysham branch at the same time. Ironically, a mere seven years after dismantling took place, what is now known as the West Coast Main Line from Crewe through Lancaster Castle station and onwards to Glasgow Central was electrified. By 1968, Promenade station was the only remaining passenger station in the town centre and its name was shortened to Morecambe.

Promenade station survived the Beeching Axe but, by the late 1980s, tourism in Morecambe was rapidly declining. Traffic levels were significantly lower than they had been at their peak 30 years before, but the four platformed, fully signalled layout had remained largely unaltered and was far too large for the modest service (one to two trains per hour) in operation. The local authority was keen to regenerate and redevelop the sea-front area surrounding the station and the adjacent Midland Hotel so, in 1993, the decision was taken to close Promenade station and replace it with a new station situated slightly further inland and closer to the town centre. A final commemorative railtour visited the station the evening before its official closure on 7 February 1994.

=== Stationmasters ===
- W. Musgrave 1907 - 1925 (transferred from Northumberland Street)
- James Henry Devanny 1925 - 1929 (formerly stationmaster at Barnoldswick)
- J.J. Davies 1929 - 1940 (formerly station master at South Wigston, later stationmaster at Low Moor, Bradford)
- R. Little from 1940
- W.A. Bell from 1943 (formerly stationmaster at Shipley)

== The site today ==
The station building remains intact. It became an entertainment venue in 1997 when the pub-cum-restaurant The Platform was opened, as well as the Platform Arts Centre and the Morecambe Tourist Information Centre has been based in the station since 1992. The station building has been sympathetically restored to its original Midland Railway condition and has won two design awards - the Ian Allan National Railway Heritage Award in 1999 (Highly Commended) and an Access for All Design Award in 1998. A special concert was held at the station on 24 March 2007 to celebrate its 100th anniversary with Lancaster's mayor, Councillor Janie Kirkman, giving a speech, followed by a concert from Brian Lancaster.

The old platforms, sidings and approach line trackbed were cleared soon after closure as part of the redevelopment plans. The town's Indoor Market Hall now occupies part of the site along with a Morrisons supermarket; the rest is used as an access road to the new station and for car parking.

== Image gallery ==
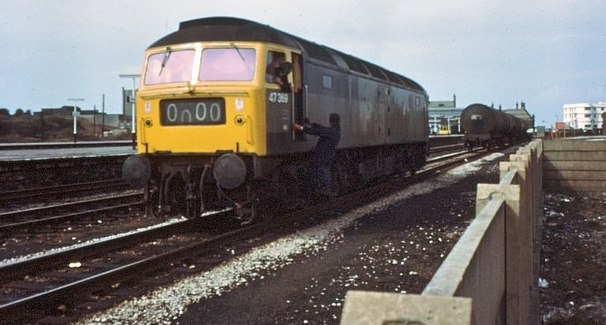
The station in 1976

Diagram of the approach and station track layout in 1987

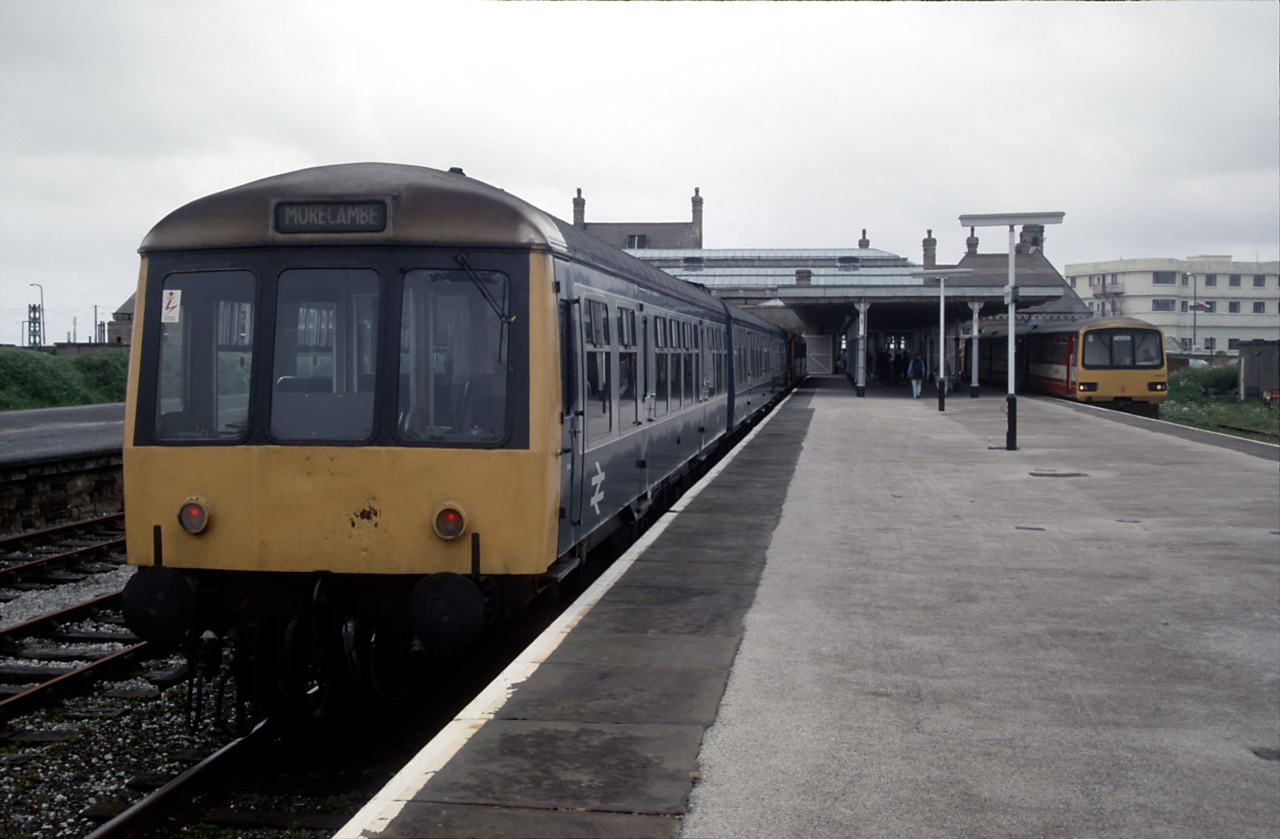
The station in 1988

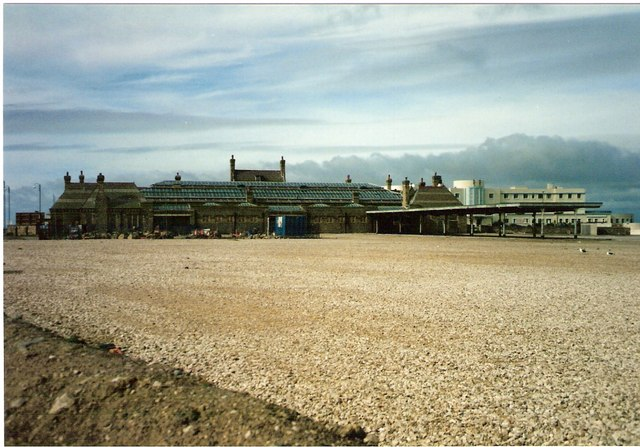
Rear view of station after closure in 1994; all tracks and sidings are gone, leaving one platform.

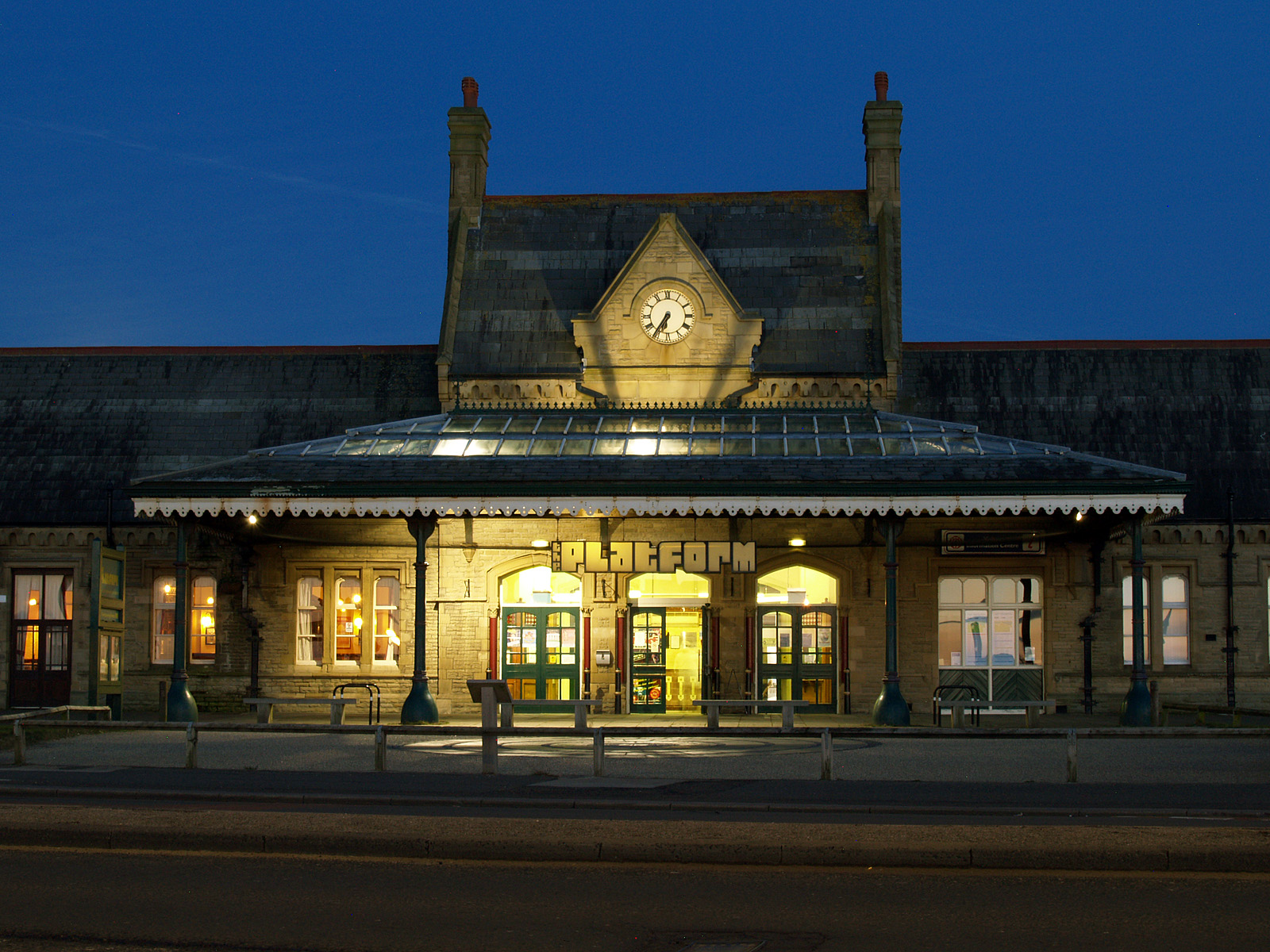
The station in 2009

A diagram of the current trackwork in Morecambe, in relation to Promenade station
