= "Little" North Western Railway =

The North Western Railway (NWR) was an early British railway company in the north-west of England. It was commonly known as the "Little" North Western Railway, to distinguish it from the larger London and North Western Railway (LNWR).

The NWR was first leased, and later taken over, by the Midland Railway (MR). The MR used part of the line for its London to Scotland Settle and Carlisle main line.

The NWR main line, which ran from Skipton in the West Riding of Yorkshire to Morecambe on the Lancashire coast, gave the MR access to the west coast in an area dominated by the rival LNWR.

Part of the line, between Lancaster and Morecambe, was used in the early twentieth century for pioneering overhead electrification.

Two-thirds of the line, in North Yorkshire, is still in use today, mainly for local services. Of the dismantled Lancashire section, two-thirds has been reused as a combined cyclepath and footpath.

== Formation ==
North Western Railway Act 1846
- Act of Parliament
- Parliament of the United Kingdom
- Long title: An Act for making a Railway from the Leeds and Bradford Extension Railway to the Lancaster and Carlisle Railway, with a diverging Line therefrom to Lancaster, to be called "The North-western Railway."
- Citation: 9 & 10 Vict. c. xcii

Dates
- Royal assent: 26 June 1846

Text of statute as originally enacted

North-western Railway Act 1852
- Act of Parliament
- Parliament of the United Kingdom
- Long title: An Act for consolidating into One Act and amending the Provisions of the several Acts relating to the North-western Railway Company; for extending the Time for constructing certain Parts of their Undertaking; and granting further Powers to the said Company; and for other Purposes.
- Citation: 15 & 16 Vict. c. cxxxv

Dates
- Royal assent: 30 June 1852

Text of statute as originally enacted

The North Western Railway was incorporated by the North Western Railway Act 1846 (9 & 10 Vict. c. xcii) on 26 June 1846 to build a railway from Skipton on the Leeds and Bradford Extension Railway to Low Gill on the Lancaster and Carlisle Railway, to carry Yorkshire-to-Scotland rail traffic.

And be it Enacted, That the Railways to be made under the authority of this Act shall be the following, (that is to say,)

- A Railway to commence at and by a junction or junctions with the Leeds and Bradford Extension Railway. at or near Carlton. in the parish of Carlton. in the West Riding of the county of York, [...] and to terminate at and by a junction with the Lancaster and Carlisle Railway, at or near Scuffton House, in Dillicar aforesaid.
- A Railway to commence at and by a junction with the said first-mentioned intended Railway, at or near Wenning Bridge, in the parish of Clapham, in the West Riding of the county of York, [...] and to terminate at or near St. George's Quay, in the Borough and Town of Lancaster; in the said county of Lancaster which Railway shall be called the Lancaster Branch of the North Western Railway.
— Section 17, North Western Railway Act 1846 (9 & 10 Vict. c. xcii)

There would be a branch at Clapham, Yorkshire to Lancaster, to make an end-on connection with an associated company.

== Morecambe Harbour and Railway ==
Morecambe Harbour and Railway Act 1846
- Act of Parliament
- Parliament of the United Kingdom
- Long title: An Act for making a Harbour and Docks at Heysham on Morecamhe Bay in the County of Lancaster, and a Railway in connexion therewith.
- Citation: 9 & 10 Vict. c. clxxxiv

Dates
- Royal assent: 16 July 1846

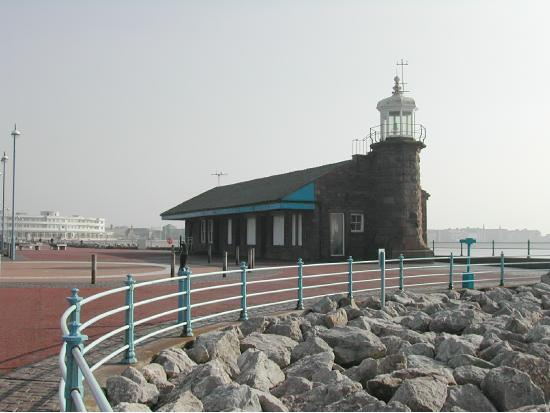
Morecambe Harbour station (now a café)

The Morecambe Harbour and Railway Company was incorporated by the Morecambe Harbour and Railway Act 1846 (9 & 10 Vict. c. clxxxiv) on 16 July 1846 to build a harbour on Morecambe Bay, close to the village of Poulton-le-Sands, and 3 miles (5 km) of railway to a new station at Lancaster Green Ayre. The single-track line opened on Whit Monday 12 June 1848, a temporary station having been constructed at Morecambe which, it was reported, afforded "every possible accommodation" to passengers.

On 18 December 1849 a short connecting curve opened between Lancaster Green Ayre and Lancaster Castle on the Lancaster and Carlisle Railway.

The company amalgamated with the NWR within months of its incorporation, although technically it remained a separate company until absorption by the Midland Railway on 1 June 1871.

The railway and harbour on Morecambe Bay led to the development of a settlement around them which absorbed Poulton-le-Sands, and later Bare and Torrisholme, and which eventually adopted the name of Morecambe.

== Construction ==
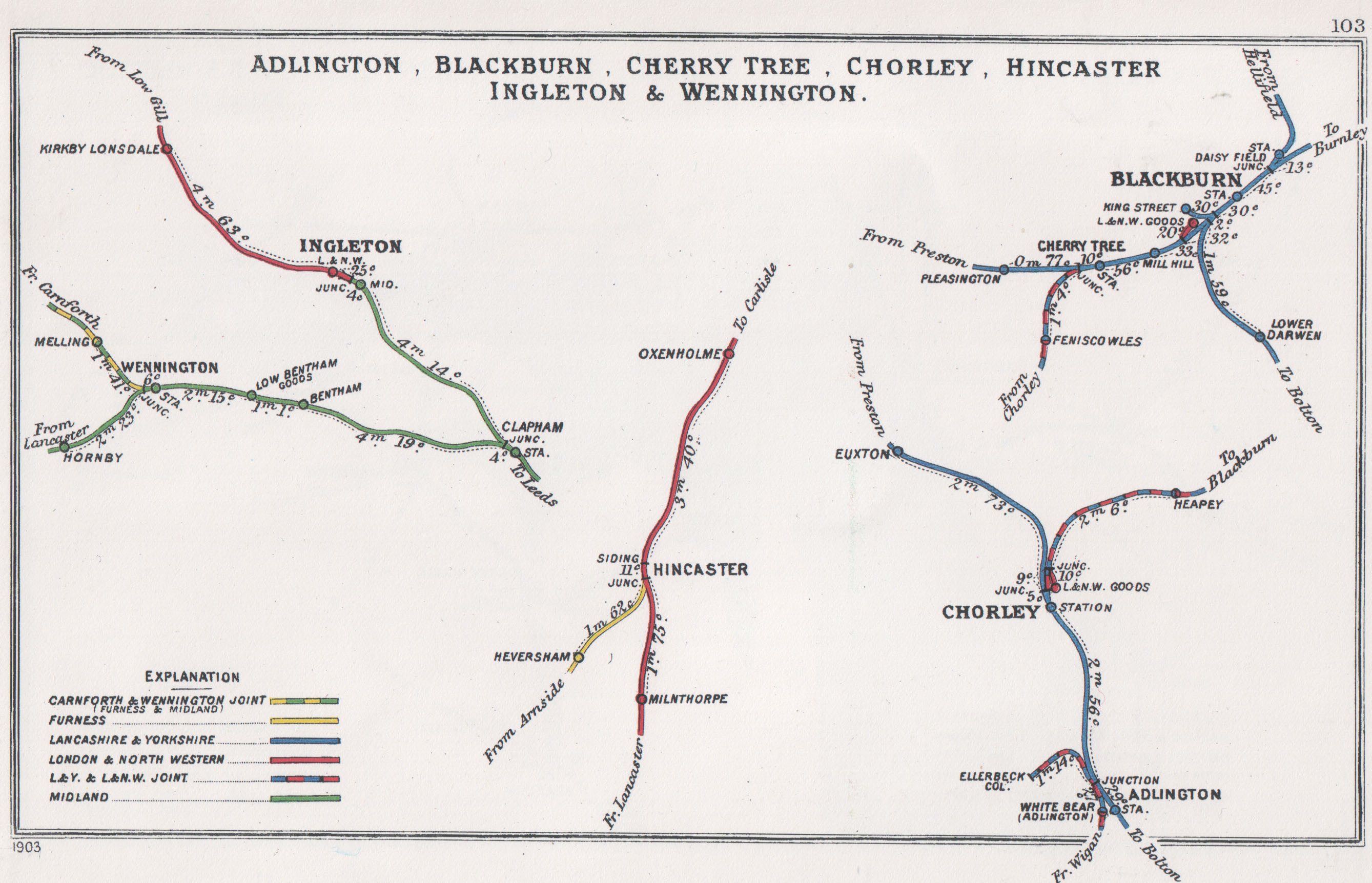
Railway Clearing House map of lines from Clapham to Ingleton and Wennington in 1903 (left).

What was the original 'main line' opened between Skipton and Ingleton, on 31 July 1849. However, due to economic recession, work on the Ingleton-to-Low Gill section was suspended, so the NWR was forced to concentrate on the branch to Lancaster.

Soon after, the line eastwards along the Lune valley from Lancaster Green Ayre to Wennington opened on 17 November 1849. The line extended further east to Bentham by 2 May 1850 and finally to Clapham where it joined the already completed line from Skipton, a month later on 1 June 1850. A horse-drawn omnibus had been used to bridge the gap between Wennington and Clapham during construction.

Upon completion of the Morecambe-to-Skipton line, the Clapham-to-Ingleton section was closed, just ten months after opening, as the prospect of completion of the partly built branch to Low Gill seemed remote.

The whole line was originally single track. By 1850, the Hornby-to-Hellifield section had been doubled, extending to Skipton by 1853. However, Morecambe-to-Lancaster remained single track until 1877, and Lancaster-to-Hornby until 1889. The curve between the two Lancaster stations was never doubled.

North-western Railway Act 1857
- Act of Parliament
- Parliament of the United Kingdom
- Long title: An Act authorizing the North-western Railway Company to divert a Portion of their Railway, and to sell or grant a Lease of their Undertaking to the Midland and Lancaster and Carlisle Railway Companies.
- Citation: 20 & 21 Vict. c. cxxxiv

Dates
- Royal assent: 10 August 1857

Text of statute as originally enacted

From 1 June 1852, the NWR was worked by the Midland Railway (MR). The North-western Railway Act 1857 (20 & 21 Vict. c. cxxxiv) authorised the leasing of the North Western Railway to the Midland Railway or the Lancaster and Carlisle Railway. Later, on 1 January 1859, both the NWR and the Morecambe Harbour and Railway (MH&R) were leased to the MR, and on 30 July 1874 the NWR was absorbed by the MR.

== Connecting lines ==
=== The Ingleton Branch ===
After considerable manoeuvring between rival companies, it was the Lancaster and Carlisle Railway, worked by the London and North Western Railway (LNWR), was authorised by the Lancaster and Carlisle and Ingleton Railway Act 1857 (20 & 21 Vict. c. clxi) to take over construction of the abandoned Ingleton-to-Low Gill line. The line opened to passengers on 16 September 1861, but to the LNWR's own station at Ingleton. The Midland and LNWR stations were at opposite ends of a viaduct, and passengers had to walk between them. However, by 1862 the LNWR trains ran through to the Midland station.

=== The Settle-Carlisle Line ===
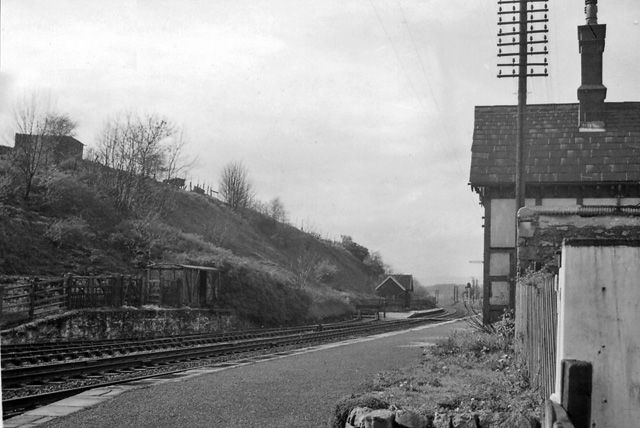
Bell Busk Station in 1961

Due to continuing friction between the MR and the LNWR over the Ingleton Branch, the MR resolved to build its own line from Settle to Carlisle, which opened to passengers on 1 May 1876. This line formed part of the MR's main line from London St Pancras to Carlisle Citadel and on to Glasgow St Enoch via the Glasgow and South Western Railway. Thus the NWR line between Skipton and Settle Junction gained main line status. Even today, the line is occasionally used for inter-city diversions.

=== Other connecting lines ===
The Furness and Midland Joint Railway built a line from Wennington on the NWR to Carnforth, where there was already a junction between the Furness Railway and the LNWR's Lancaster and Carlisle Railway. The line opened to passengers on 6 June 1867.

The Lancaster and Carlisle Railway also built a branch from Hest Bank on its main line to meet the NWR just before Morecambe station, opening on 13 August 1864. However, LNWR passenger trains had their own station, initially at Morecambe Poulton Lane and, from 1886, at Morecambe Euston Road.

The Lancashire and Yorkshire Railway extended its line through Clitheroe to a junction with the NWR at Hellifield on 1 June 1880.

== Extension to Heysham ==
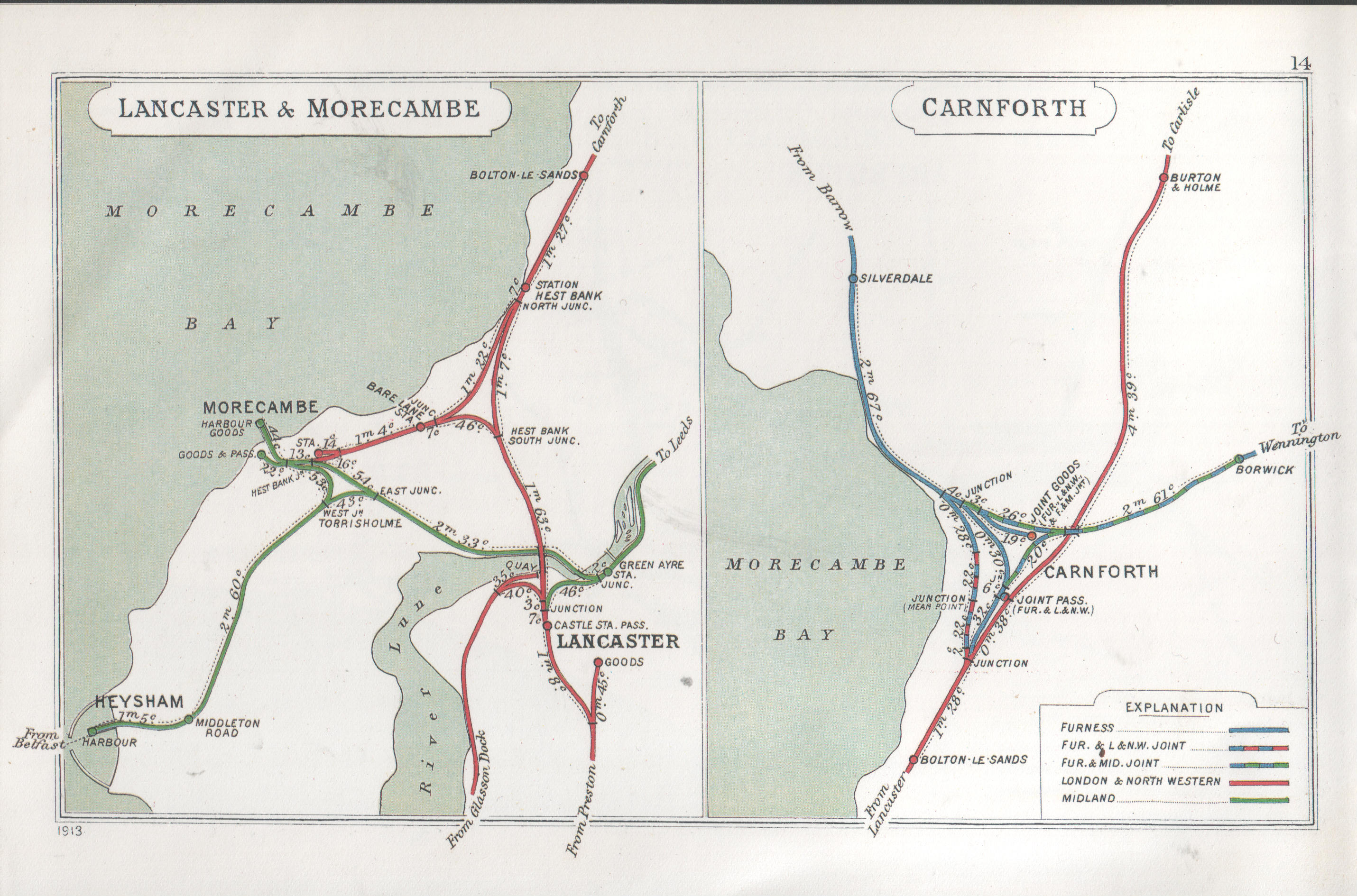
Railways around Lancaster and Morecambe in 1913

Heysham Harbour was opened by the Midland Railway in 1904, to replace the same company's harbour in Morecambe. A branch line from the NWR line had already opened for contractors on 12 November 1898 but was opened to passengers on 1 September 1904. The new line made a triangular junction with the existing NWR line a very short distance east of the junction with the LNWR line from Hest Bank.

== Electrification ==
The line between Lancaster, Morecambe and Heysham pioneered the use of overhead cables for electrification. Heysham-to-Morecambe was electrified on 13 April 1908, extending to Lancaster Green Ayre on 1 July and to Lancaster Castle on 14 September. The system used 6.6 kV at 25 Hz, with the electricity provided by a power station at Heysham, supplied via cables suspended from overhead steel archways.

After 11 February 1951, steam trains temporarily took over while the system was upgraded to 6.6 kV at 50 Hz. Full electric service resumed on 17 August 1953, with power supplied from a new substation at Green Ayre. On a 4,000-foot (1,200 m) section of track, the overhead arches were replaced by experimental cantilever structures, separate for each of the two tracks.

== Closures ==
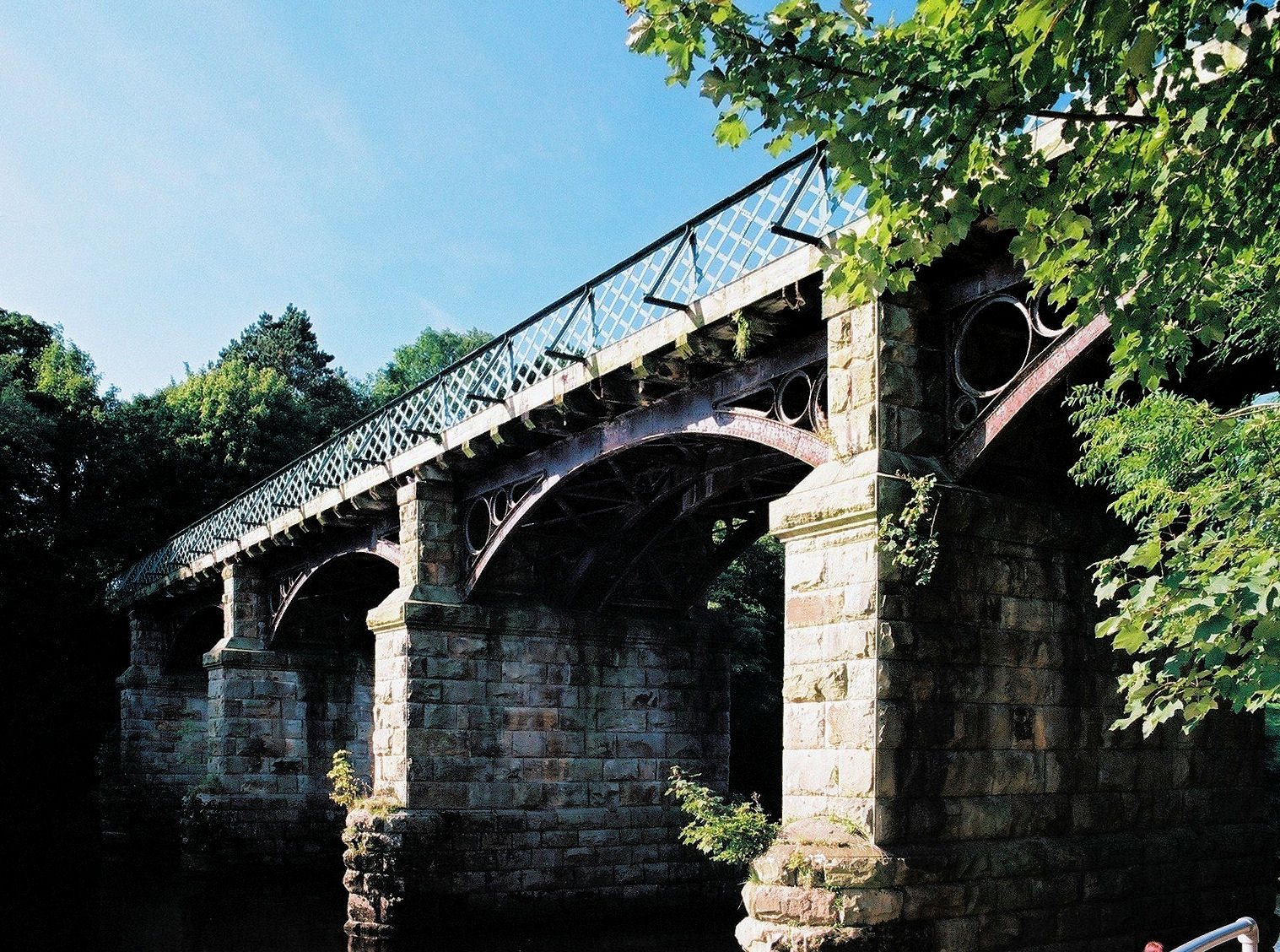
Disused railway bridge at the Crook o' Lune, one of two within 200 m, still used as a cycle path. Designed by Edmund Sharpe, it is a Grade II listed building

The Ingleton Branch closed to passengers on 30 January 1954, but was still used for goods and occasional excursions until closure on 26 July 1966, after which the tracks were lifted.

The Wennington-to-Morecambe section of the line was closed under the Beeching Axe. Passenger traffic ceased on 2 January 1966. However, an alternative Wennington-to-Morecambe connection has been maintained using the former Furness and Midland Joint Railway to Carnforth and thence the former LNWR Morecambe Branch Line, a route still in use today by the Leeds to Morecambe Line.

Goods traffic via the Lune Valley line ceased on 4 June 1967, except for a short single-track spur from the Heysham line towards Lancaster which closed on 31 January 1970, and another single-track spur from Lancaster Castle to a power station which closed on 16 March 1976.

Almost all of the route of the dismantled line between Caton and Morecambe has been preserved as a combined cyclepath and footpath, except for a short section near Lancaster city centre. Here the line's Greyhound Bridge over the River Lune was converted for use as a road bridge.

The Morecambe-to-Heysham branch closed to passengers on 4 October 1975, but reopened on 11 May 1987 for sailings to the Isle of Man. The branch has been single track since Morecambe station was relocated in 1994. The branch now connects only to Morecambe's platform 2.
