= Wennington railway station =

Railway station in Lancashire, England

Wennington
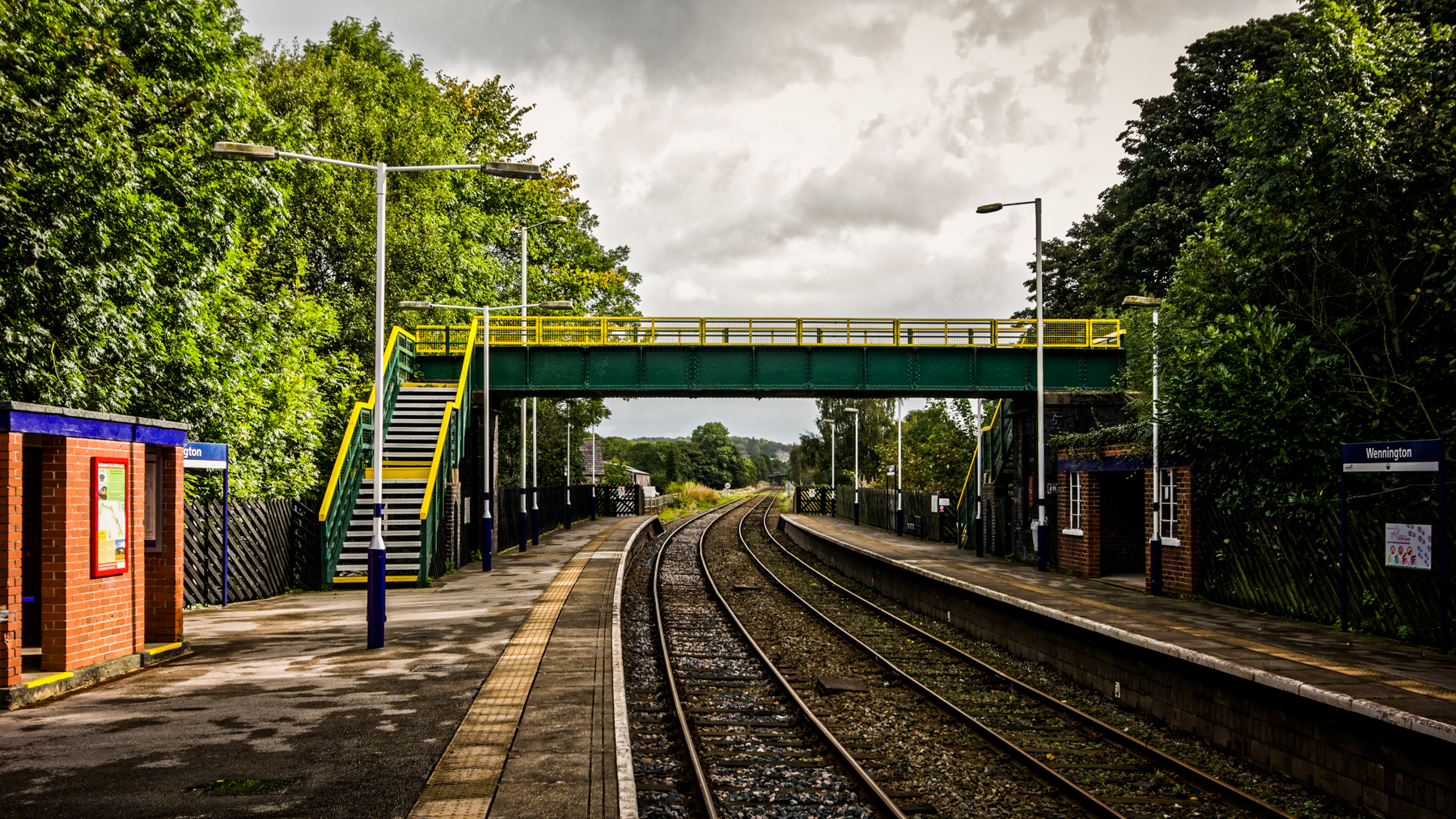

General information
- Location: Wennington, City of Lancaster; England
- Coordinates: 54°07′25″N 2°35′15″W
- Grid reference: SD616699
- Owner: Network Rail
- Manager: Northern Trains
- Platforms: 2
- Tracks: 2

Other information
- Station code: WNN
- Classification: DfT category F2

History
- Original company: "Little" North Western Railway
- Pre-grouping: Midland Railway
- Post-grouping: London Midland and Scottish Railway; British Rail (London Midland Region)

Key dates
- 17 November 1849: Opened as Tatham Bridge
- 2 May 1850: Rebuilt and renamed Wennington

Passengers
- 2021/22: ▲3,604
- 2022/23: ▲5,812
- 2023/24: ▲6,366
- 2024/25: ▲6,632
- 2025/26: ▲8,234
Location
- Location within the City of Lancaster district Location within Lancashire
Notes
- Passenger statistics from the Office of Rail and Road

Wennington is a railway station on the Bentham Line, which runs between Leeds and Morecambe via Skipton. The station, situated 15 3/4 miles (25 km) east of Lancaster, serves the village of Wennington in Lancashire. It is owned by Network Rail and managed by Northern Trains.

== History ==
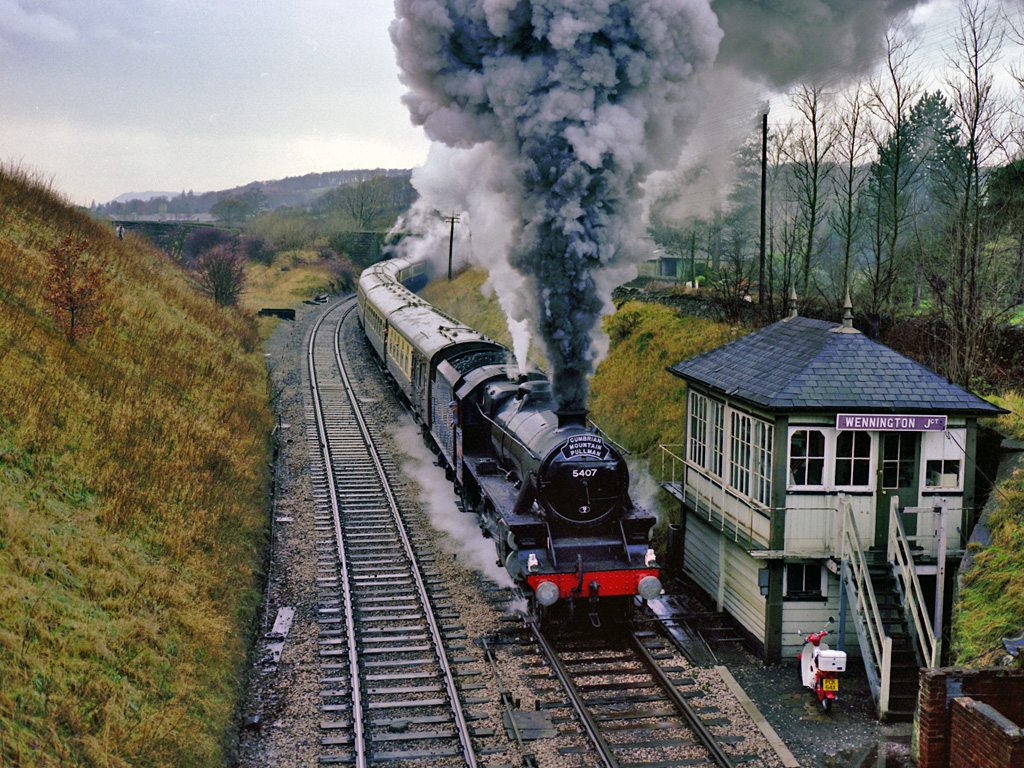
Preserved Black Five 4-6-0 locomotive 5407 passes Wennington Junction signal box in 1982.

Originally opened by the "Little" North Western Railway in 1849 on their line between Skipton and Morecambe, the station was rebuilt and expanded in 1865 prior to the opening of the Furness and Midland Joint Railway from Carnforth in 1867. Thereafter it became a busy junction, with many passenger trains calling to detach through carriages for Carnforth from the main Morecambe portion if heading west or attaching them if heading east - a bay platform was provided at the east end of the station for this purpose, along with several sidings on the opposite side of the line for locomotive and carriage stabling (all since removed, along with the extra platform line). A number of local services (mainly from the Carnforth line) also originated or terminated there.

Much of this activity ended with the withdrawal of local stopping trains on the Carnforth line in 1960 (though it remained in use for through services) and the closure of the Lancaster line to passengers in January 1966. The latter was then closed to all traffic the following year and subsequently lifted, although the abandoned trackbed can still be seen. The station itself was listed for closure in Beeching's report, but was spared. The original station buildings have also been demolished and replaced by shelters, although the signal box remained in use as the last remaining block post on the line until 1988 – it was then closed and permanently "switched out" but was not formally abolished and removed until 2006.

=== Accidents and incidents ===
The junction was the site of a derailment on 11 August 1880 in which eight people were killed.

== Facilities ==
The station is unstaffed and has no ticket-buying facilities. Passengers therefore must purchase these on the train or in advance of their journey. Train running information is provided by telephone and information posters. Step-free access is limited to the eastbound platform, as the westbound one can only be reached by footbridge.

== Services ==
From Monday to Saturday, there were formerly five daily services to Lancaster (journey time 25mins) and to Skipton & Leeds (1hr20). All but the first of the daily westbound departures continue onwards to Morecambe.

On Sundays there were four services in each direction all year round since the May 2011 timetable change - prior to this the first two departures each way ran only during the summer months.

From the start of the May 2018 summer timetable, additional services have been introduced. Seven trains each way run to Lancaster and Skipton, with three of the former continuing to Morecambe and six of the latter to Leeds (though the direct train to and from Heysham has ceased). One additional train each way runs on Sundays. As of May 2019, one further service has been introduced each way, to bring the weekday frequency to eight in each direction. Five of these run to/from Morecambe.

Preceding station	National Rail	Following station
Bentham	Northern Trains; Bentham Line	Carnforth
	Historical railways	
Bentham High	Midland Railway; Furness and Midland Joint Railway	Melling
	Disused railways	
Low Bentham	Midland Railway "Little" North Western Railway	Wray

== Sources ==
- Binns, D. (1982), The Little North Western Railway, Wyvern Publications, Skipton, ISBN 0-907941-01-X.
