= Morecambe Euston Road railway station =

Former railway station in Lancashire, England

Morecambe Euston Road
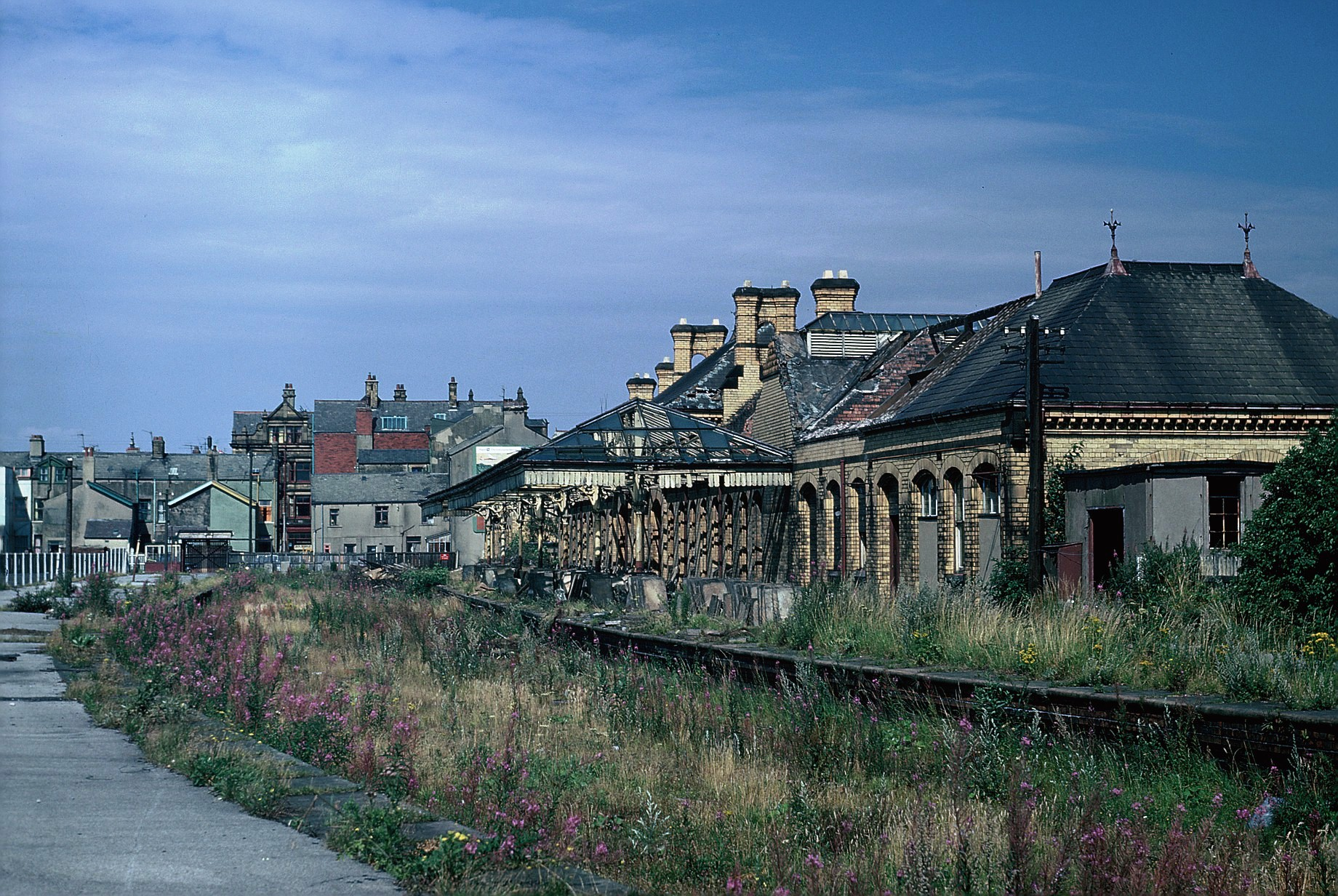
- The station pictured ten years after its closure

General information
- Location: Morecambe, Lancaster, Lancashire, England
- Coordinates: 54.0707°N 2.8623°W
- Platforms: 5

Other information
- Status: Disused

History
- Original company: London and North Western Railway
- Post-grouping: London, Midland and Scottish Railway

Key dates
- 9 May 1886: Opened as Morecambe
- 2 June 1924: Renamed Morecambe Euston Road
- 15 September 1958: Summer excursions only
- 8 September 1962: Closed to passengers
- 9 October 1972: Closed completely
Location
- Location within Morecambe Location within the City of Lancaster district Location within Lancashire

Morecambe Euston Road was the terminus station of the London and North Western Railway's branch line to Morecambe, in Lancashire, England. It closed in 1962, after which all trains to the town used the nearby Morecambe Promenade station.

== History ==
The first railway to Morecambe was built by the Morecambe Harbour and Railway (MHR) company in 1848. It had its station at Northumberland Street, roughly the same location as the modern-day Morecambe station. The MHR had, in 1846, amalgamated with the "Little" North Western Railway (NWR), which was taken over by the Midland Railway in 1874.

The rival London and North Western Railway (LNWR) built its own branch line to Morecambe in 1864, joining the main LNWR line at Hest Bank. The line connected to the NWR's Northumberland Street station and the harbour, but the LNWR had to provide its own station at Poulton Lane from November 1870 because of increasing congestion at Northumberland Street. This was subsequently replaced by a rather more substantial terminus on the town's Euston Road, which opened on 9 May 1886.

The new station (originally known only as Morecambe or Morecambe (LNWR)) was initially built with one long platform with glass canopy and a substantial two-storey main building built from yellow brick. A goods yard was also provided alongside, next the original connection onto Midland metals. Services initially ran to and from Hest Bank, but the commissioning of a new south-facing curve from Bare Lane to the main line in May 1888 saw most of them transferred to Lancaster Castle instead in an attempt to compete with the existing Midland service. By 1895, nine trains per day each way were running on the route and the volume of traffic using the station had reached the level where one platform was no longer adequate (especially in the summer). Accordingly, two new island platforms were built by the LNWR, bring the total number of faces in use to five.

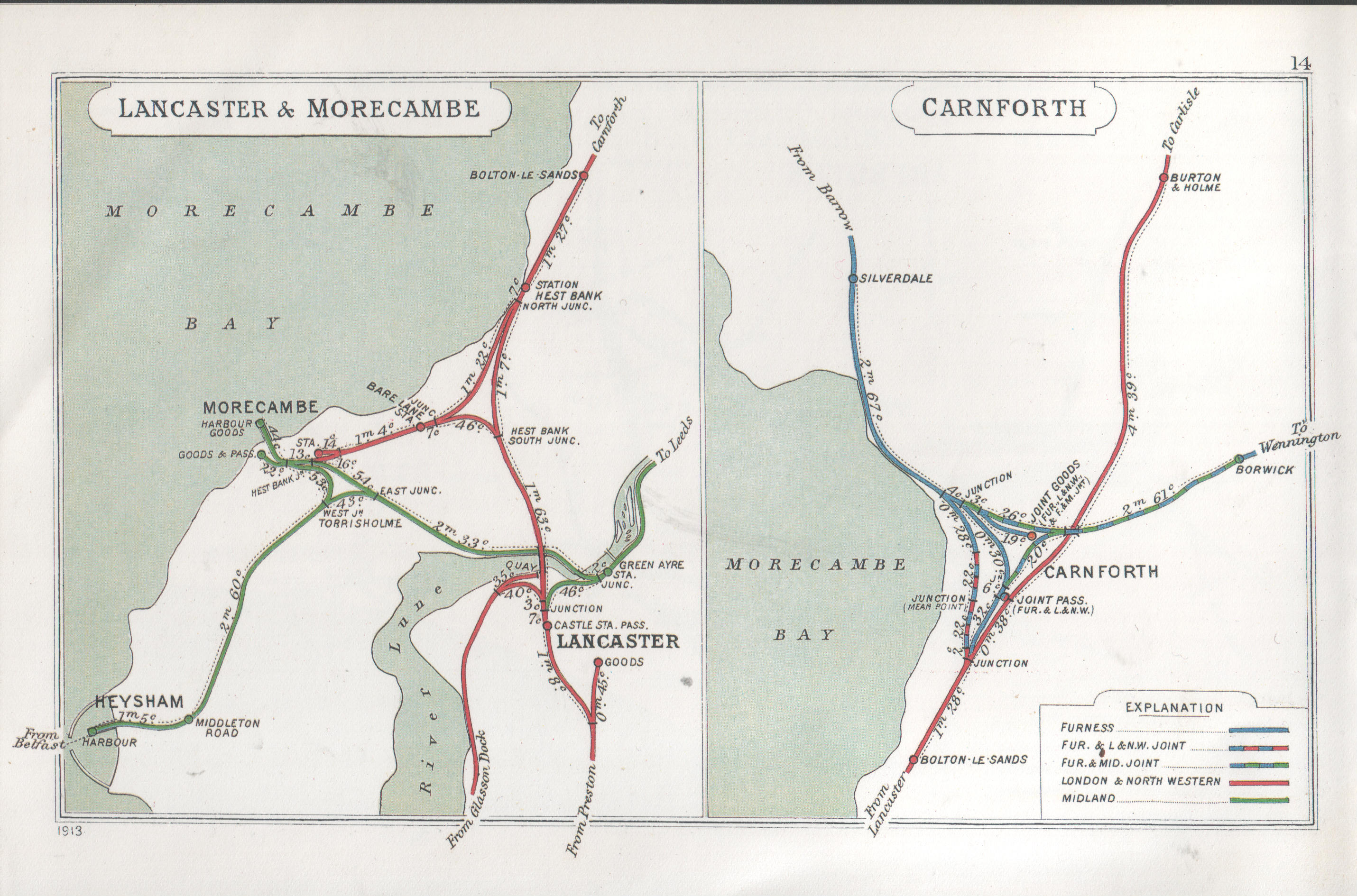
Railways around Lancaster and Morecambe in 1913

After the 1923 Grouping, the station came under the control of the London, Midland and Scottish Railway (LMS) along with its erstwhile Midland rival half a mile away and so was officially designated as Euston Road from 2 June 1924 (the Midland station becoming Morecambe Promenade on the same date). Under LMS auspices, Promenade would become the town's principal station, but the volume of summer holiday traffic to the resort was such that Euston Road continued to be heavily used; the 1932 timetable for it featured departures for destinations as varied as Barrow-in-Furness, Manchester Victoria, London Euston and Crewe on top of the frequent shuttle service to/from Lancaster. This pattern continued after World War II and the subsequent nationalisation of the UK railway system in January 1948, when it became part of the London Midland Region of British Railways.

=== Post-war ===
Outside the summer months though, Euston Road remained much quieter than its Midland neighbour and it was the obvious one to be closed when traffic to the resort began to decline from the mid-1950s onwards. From 15 September 1958, regular service trains were all diverted to Promenade and the station was thereafter only used in the summer for overspill traffic. This though would remain substantial to begin with; the 1959 summer Saturday timetable featured no less than 26 arrivals and 23 departures to destinations as varied as Glasgow Central, Windermere, Birmingham New Street, Manchester Exchange, Millom and Stockport. Parcels and freight traffic also used the station throughout the year.

The 1962 summer season would be its final one, with the 4.25pm service to Lancaster on 8 September proving to be the last timetabled departure. The following March would see it listed for closure in the Beeching Report and although it appeared in that summer's BR passenger timetable, the handful of scheduled excursions were in practice diverted to use Promenade instead. It was then omitted from subsequent timetables altogether, which resulted in some publications giving its official closure date as 7 September 1963.

The station tracks continued to be used for stabling empty coaching stock until the summer of 1965 and then later that year the track was lifted. The goods yard continued in operation until 9 October 1972.

Preceding station	Disused railways	Following station
Morecambe Poulton Lane	London and North Western Railway; Morecambe Branch Line	Terminus

== The site today ==
The disused station buildings and platform were eventually demolished in the mid-1970s and the site redeveloped, but its goods shed survives in a builders' merchant's yard.
