= Silverdale railway station =

Railway station in Lancashire, England

Silverdale
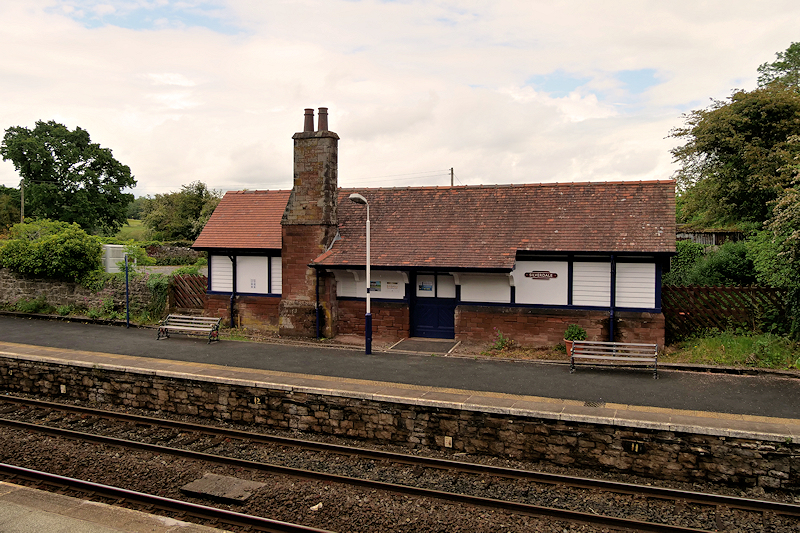

General information
- Location: Silverdale, City of Lancaster; England
- Coordinates: 54°10′11″N 2°48′14″W
- Grid reference: SD476751
- Owner: Network Rail
- Manager: Northern Trains
- Platforms: 2
- Tracks: 2

Other information
- Station code: SVR
- Classification: DfT category F2

History
- Original company: Ulverstone and Lancaster Railway
- Pre-grouping: Furness Railway
- Post-grouping: London, Midland and Scottish Railway; British Rail (London Midland Region)

Key dates
- 1 September 1857: Opened

Passengers
- 2021/22: ▲41,260
- 2022/23: ▲42,212
- 2023/24: ▲46,524
- 2024/25: ▲48,316
- 2025/26: ▲56,806
Location
- Location within the City of Lancaster district Location within Lancashire
Notes
- Passenger statistics from the Office of Rail and Road

Silverdale is a railway station on the Furness Line, which runs between Barrow-in-Furness and Lancaster. The station, situated 9 1/2 miles (15 km) north-west of Lancaster, serves the village of Silverdale in Lancashire. It is owned by Network Rail and managed by Northern Trains.

== Facilities ==
There is no footbridge or underpass; passengers cross the line at track level via a barrow crossing (so disabled travellers are not recommended to use the southbound platform without assistance). The station buildings have been converted for residential use, but there are shelters on each side. There is a small car park. A ticket machine is available, so travellers can purchase tickets (or a permit to travel if not in possession of a credit or debit card) here prior to boarding. Train running information is provided via digital information displays and timetable posters.

The station is about 1.3 miles (2.1 km) from the centre of the village by road, somewhat less by footpaths across the golf course and fields.

The station is conveniently situated for visitors to Leighton Moss RSPB reserve, a few minutes' walk away, and Silverdale Golf Club, just across the road from the station. In June 2018, volunteers helped to set up a community-provided broadband link using the wifi from the nearby golf club and equipment supplied by Broadband for the Rural North (B4RN).

== Services ==
Silverdale is generally served by the hourly Furness Line services from Lancaster to Barrow-in-Furness operated by Northern who also manage the station. Several longer-distance trains to Carlisle (via Millom) and Manchester Airport via Preston and Manchester Piccadilly call at the station throughout the day.

== Friends of Silverdale Station ==
In 2015, the Friends of Silverdale Station (FOSS) was founded, with the intention of improving and enhancing the station. The group has held working parties to tidy the platforms and plant flowerbeds, and hopes to restore the 1850s Furness Railway waiting room for community use.

Preceding station	National Rail	Following station
Arnside	Northern Trains; Cumbria–Manchester Airport	Carnforth
Arnside	Northern Trains; Furness line	Carnforth
