= Morecambe Poulton Lane railway station =

Disused station in Lancashire, England

Morecambe Poulton Lane

General information
- Location: Morecambe, Lancaster, Lancashire; England
- Coordinates: 54.070°N 2.856°W
- Platforms: ?

Other information
- Status: Disused

History
- Original company: London and North Western Railway

Key dates
- 1864: Opened
- 1886: Closed
Location

Morecambe Poulton Lane was the original terminus station of the London and North Western Railway's branch to Morecambe, Lancaster, Lancashire, England. It was opened to passengers in 1864 and closed in 1886, when it was replaced by Morecambe Euston Road. The line remains open between Morecambe and Lancaster, however nothing remains of the station.

Preceding station	Disused railways	Following station
Morecambe Euston Road	London and North Western Railway	Bare Lane
