= Carnforth railway station =

Railway station in Lancashire, England

Carnforth
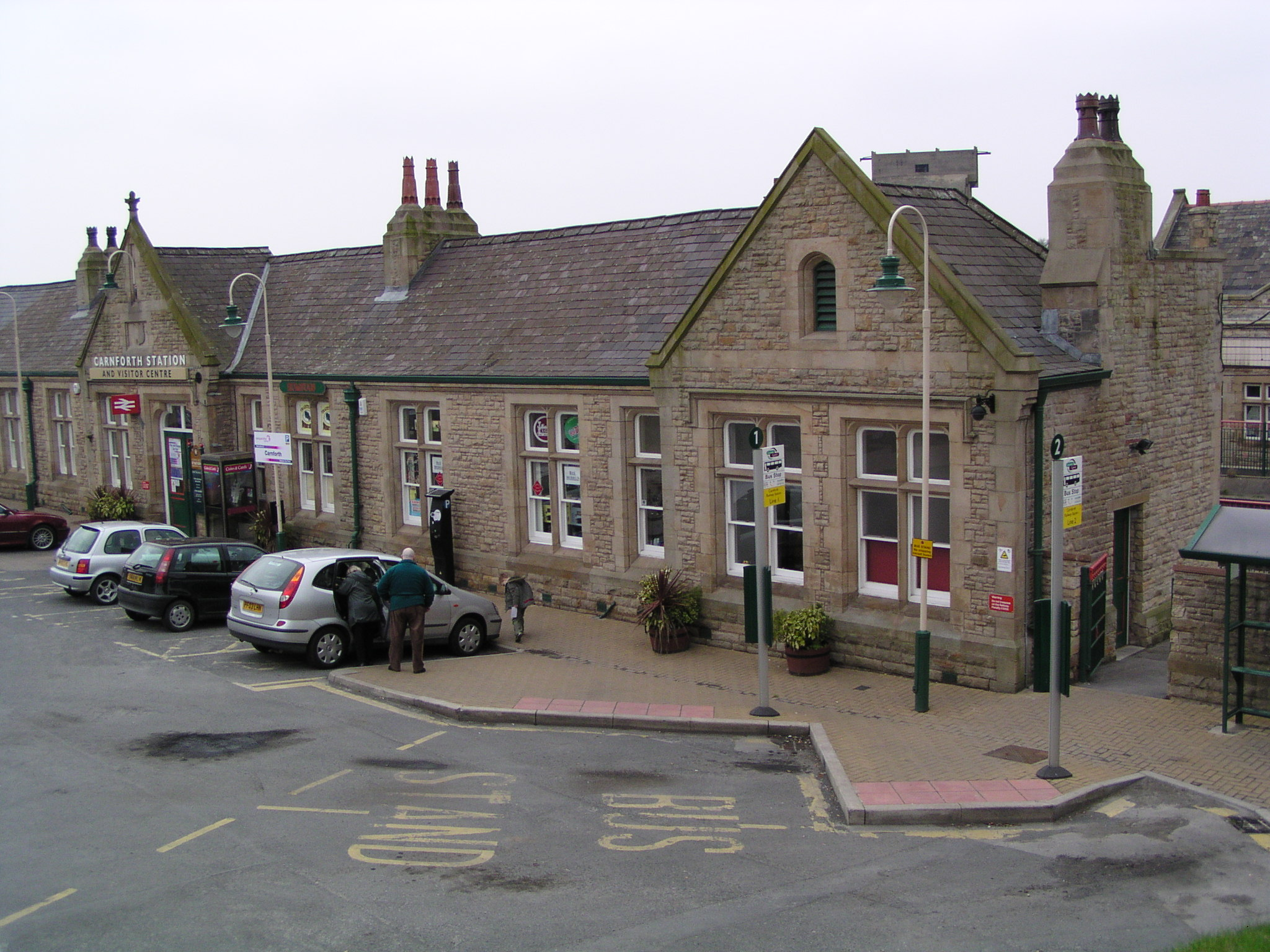

General information
- Location: Carnforth, City of Lancaster; England
- Coordinates: 54°07′47″N 2°46′17″W
- Grid reference: SD496706
- Owner: Network Rail
- Manager: Northern Trains
- Platforms: 2
- Tracks: 4

Other information
- Station code: CNF
- Classification: DfT category F1

History
- Original company: Lancaster and Carlisle Railway, Ulverstone and Lancaster Railway
- Pre-grouping: Furness Railway, London and North Western Railway, Midland Railway
- Post-grouping: London, Midland and Scottish Railway, British Rail (London Midland Region)

Key dates
- 22 September 1846: L&CR: Opened as Carnforth–Yealand
- 6 June 1857: U&LR: Opened as Carnforth
- 1 February 1864: L&CR: Renamed Carnforth
- 2 August 1880: L&CR and U&LR stations combined
- 1 May 1970: WCML platforms closed

Passengers
- 2020/21: ▼51,772
- Interchange: 1,987
- 2021/22: ▲0.151 million
- Interchange: ▲11,282
- 2022/23: ▲0.162 million
- Interchange: ▲15,713
- 2023/24: ▲0.175 million
- Interchange: ▲16,518
- 2024/25: ▲0.196 million
- Interchange: ▲16,795
Location
- Location within the City of Lancaster district Location within Lancashire
Notes
- Passenger statistics from the Office of Rail and Road

Carnforth is a railway station on the Bentham and Furness Lines, sited 6 miles (10 km) north of Lancaster, England; it serves the market town of Carnforth, in Lancashire, England. It is owned by Network Rail and managed by Northern Trains.

== History ==
Carnforth railway station was opened on 22 September 1846 by the Lancaster and Carlisle Railway (L&CR); it had a single platform and was a second-class station. It became a junction on 6 June 1857, when the Ulverstone and Lancaster Railway arrived from the north-west; the station served as the line's southern terminus. The Furness Railway took over the U&LR in 1862 and became the second major company operating to Carnforth.

The station was enlarged during the 1870s. In 1880, it began receiving trains from the Midland Railway, following the commissioning of a south-to-east direct curve to the Furness and Midland Joint Railway, creating a triangular junction.

The L&CR was taken over by the London and North Western Railway (LNWR), with the station operated under a joint management by the Furness Railway and LNWR; the Midland Railway had running powers into the station. Station personnel wore a uniform with the initials CJS for Carnforth: Joint Station. The Furness Railway erected a distinctive stone-built signal box to the north-west of the station in 1882, used until 1903, and this survives preserved as a grade II listed building.

A major rebuilding project, including a 300-yard long platform (currently used by northbound services), started in 1938 with government funding. With the opening of the new platform on 3 July 1939, it brought the number of platforms in use to six. In 1942, the government approved the rebuilding of Carnforth MPD into a major regional railway depot; the work was completed in 1944.

The film Brief Encounter was partly filmed at the station in February 1945. The station clock became a powerful icon through repeated use in the film. It was removed for restoration in 2020 and replaced in March 2026.

=== Withdrawal of West Coast Main Line services ===
The West Coast Main Line (WCML) platforms were closed in May 1970, following the withdrawal of local stopping passenger services between Lancaster and Carlisle two years earlier. The platform walls facing the fast lines were demolished, cut back and fenced off before the commissioning of 25 kV overhead electrification in 1974. This made Carnforth a secondary line station, even though it is situated on the main line, as WCML trains cannot call.

In 2011, Network Rail rejected proposals to reopen the main line platforms, stating that there would be too few passengers to justify slowing down trains. Only the former platforms 4 (the original Furness Railway through platform) and 6 (the LMS 1939 platform) remain in use (now renumbered 1 and 2); the old 'Midland bay' (No 5), which once catered for services on the Furness and Midland Joint Railway (between Carnforth and Skipton) has had its track removed.

Responsibility for the signalling at the station is divided between Preston PSB (main line) and the surviving manual ex-Furness Railway signal box at Carnforth Station Junction, sited just past the junction between the Barrow and Leeds lines. This has acted as the 'fringe' box to the PSB since the main line was resignalled in 1972/3. Two other boxes (F&M Junction and East Junction) were closed and demolished when the northern side of the triangle (avoiding the station) was decommissioned in 1998.

=== Refurbishment ===
After lying in a semi-derelict state for many years, the station buildings were refurbished between 2000 and 2003 and returned to commercial use. An award-winning Heritage Centre including a small railway museum and the Brief Encounter refreshment room, a number of shops and a travel/ticket office occupy the buildings.

The outer half of the non-operational up main (southbound) platform is in use as the access route to the subway, the active platforms and tearoom.

=== Signalling Upgrades ===
Legacy signal indicator PN291, wall-mounted on platform 2

In April 2026, VolkerRail completed the replacement of ageing signalling infrastructure at Carnforth station as part of the Tranche 6 programme with Network Rail: upgrading signalling structures along the West Coast Main Line.

The project involved replacing the PN291 and PN292 signal structures with a twin-track cantilever structure and modern LED signal heads.

== Facilities ==
The booking office is staffed part-time (six days per week, closed Sundays and public holidays). It is run by an independent retailer on behalf of the local authority, but sells a full range of National Rail tickets. Both platforms have waiting rooms and step-free access (by the aforementioned subway ramps) from the station entrance, whilst train running information is provided by automated PA announcements, timetable posters and digital information screens.

There is also a micropub called The Snug, which was the first of its kind to be set up in the North West and has been in the CAMRA Good Beer Guide. It hosts an annual beer festival inside the Heritage Centre in mid-to-late November.

To the west of the station lies Carnforth MPD, which is also the headquarters of West Coast Railways.

== Services ==
Northern Trains operates all National Rail services that stop at Carnforth, on the following lines:

=== Bentham Line ===
As of the May 2025 timetable change, eight trains per day (five on Sunday) operate between Lancaster and Leeds, via Skipton. Most run to and from Morecambe.

Rolling stock used: Class 158 Express Sprinter

=== Furness Line ===
As of the May 2023 timetable change, eleven trains per day (seven on Sunday) operate between Manchester Airport and Barrow-in-Furness, with an hourly service running between Lancaster and Barrow-in-Furness. Some trains continue to Carlisle, via Whitehaven.

Rolling stock used: Class 156 Super Sprinter and Class 195 Civity

=== Morecambe Branch Line ===
A single early morning direct service to Morecambe, using the north curve at Hest Bank, operates on weekdays and Saturday. It is a parliamentary train, providing a statutory minimum service over this stretch of railway.

| Preceding station | National Rail | Following station |
|---|---|---|
| Wennington | Northern Trains; Bentham Line | Lancaster |
| Silverdale | Northern Trains; Furness Line | Lancaster |
| Reversal | Northern Trains; Morecambe Branch Line | Lancaster |
| Reversal | Northern Trains; Morecambe Branch Line | Bare Lane |
| | Historical railways | |
| Silverdale | Furness Railway; Ulverston and Lancaster Railway | Bolton-le-Sands |
| Borwick | Furness and Midland Joint Railway | Bolton-le-Sands |
| Burton and Holme | Lancaster and Carlisle Railway | Bolton-le-Sands |

== See also ==
- Listed buildings in Carnforth

== Bibliography ==
- Marshall, Geoff; Pipe, Vicki (2018). The Railway Adventures: Places, Trains, People and Stations. September Publishing. ISBN 978-1910463871.
