= Leeds–Morecambe line =

Railway line in northern England

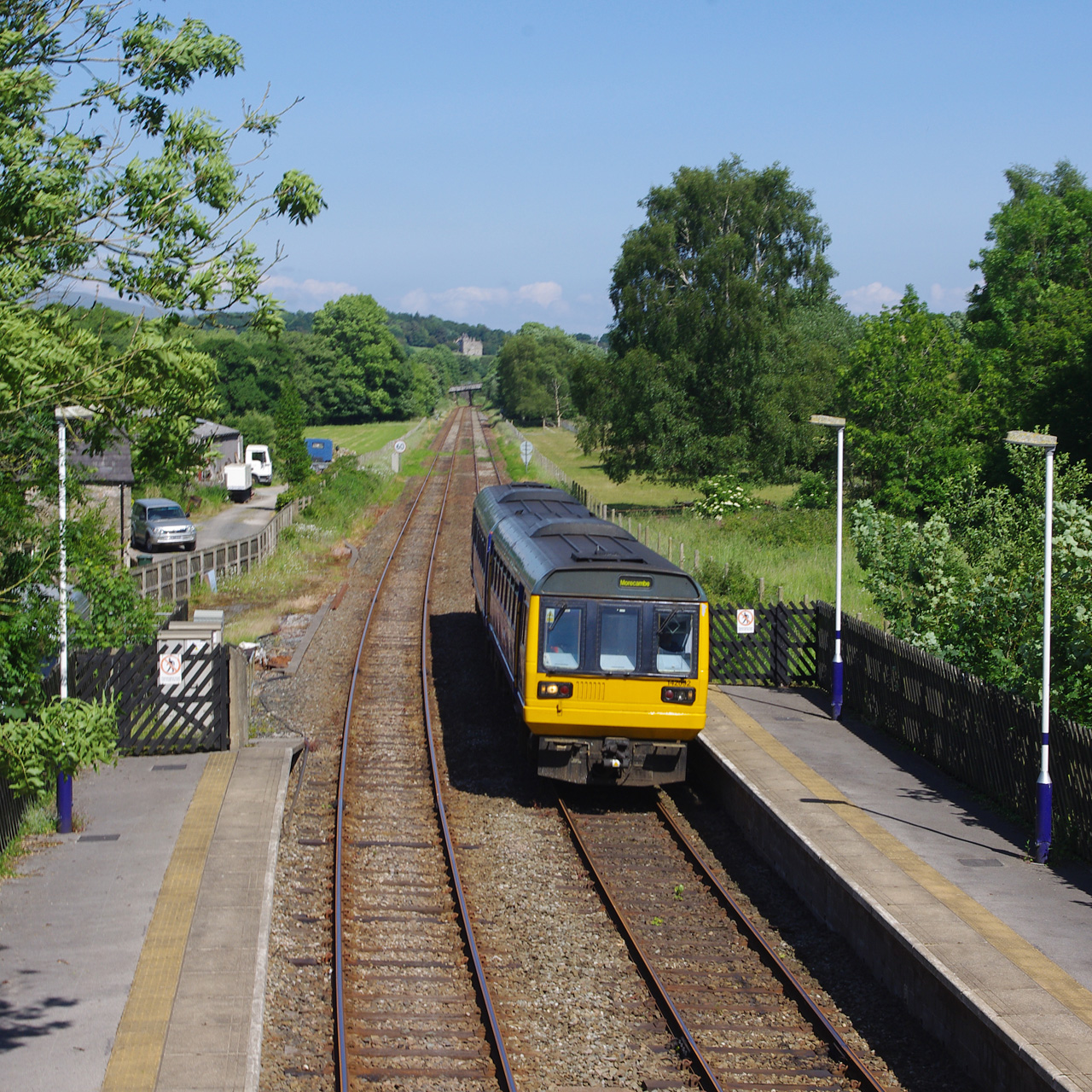
- A Morecambe-bound service at Wennington in 2018

Overview
- Owner: Network Rail
- Locale: West Yorkshire; North Yorkshire; Lancashire

Service
- Operator: Northern

Technical
- Track gauge: 1,435 mm (4 ft 8 1/2 in) standard gauge
Route map
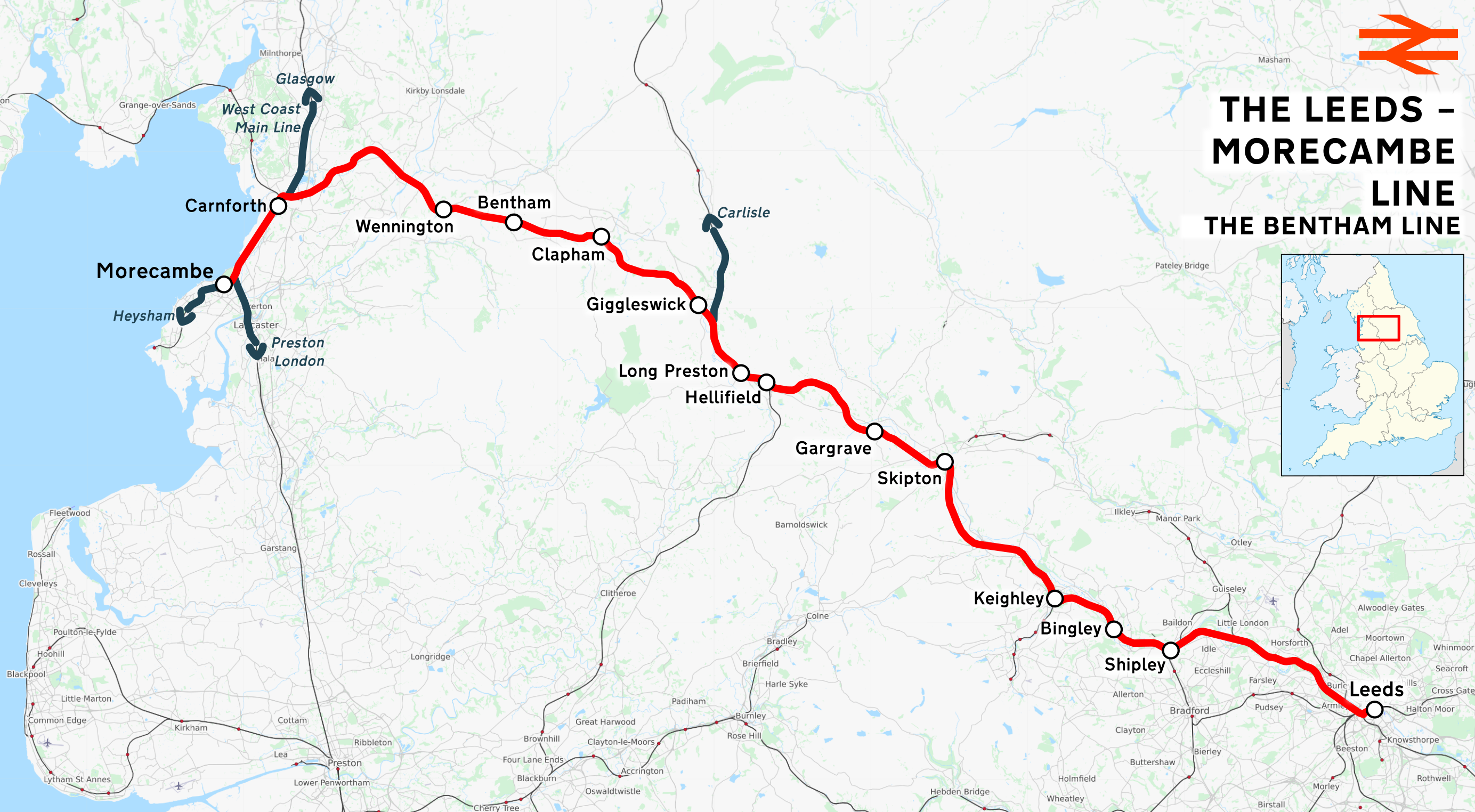
(Click to expand)

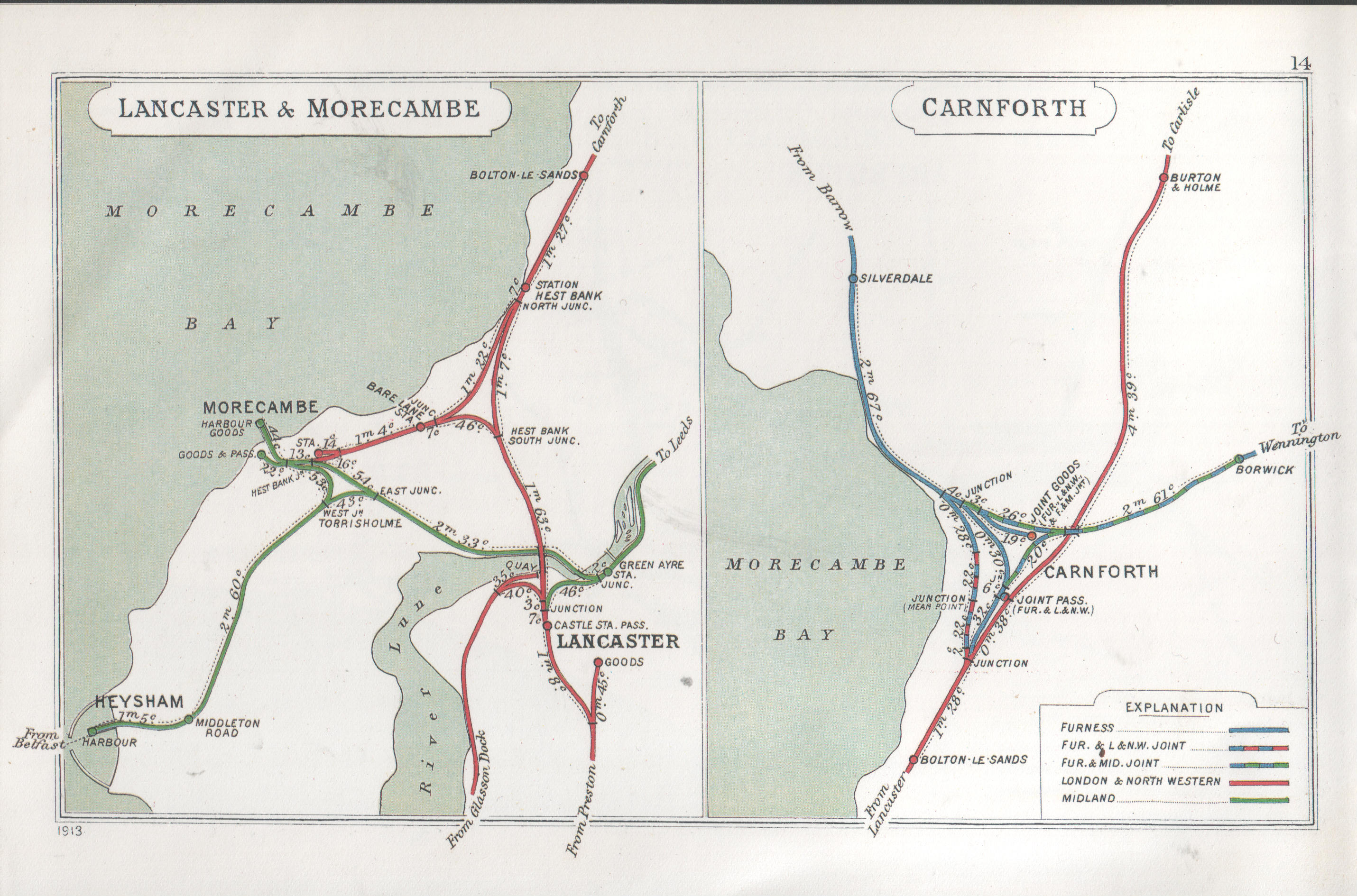
Railways between Carnforth, Lancaster and Morecambe in 1913

The Leeds–Morecambe line, also known as the Bentham line, is a railway line running between Leeds, Skipton, Lancaster and Morecambe in northern England. The service is operated by Northern. The route covered by the service was historically part of the Midland Railway. The line is electrified at 25 kV AC overhead between Leeds City and Skipton: this section is also known as the Airedale line.

== The route ==
=== Airedale line (Leeds–Skipton) ===
The first section, between Leeds City and Shipley was opened by the Leeds and Bradford Railway on 1 July 1846, and extended to Skipton by the Leeds and Bradford Extension Railway.

=== Skipton–Settle ===
The line from here, known as the "Little" North Western Railway, opened as far as Clapham on 30 July 1849 and through to Lancaster on 1 June 1850. Here were junctions for the following lines:

- the Yorkshire Dales Railway, opened 30 July 1902, closed 22 September 1930, and which linked to the Skipton–Ilkley line
- the continuation of Leeds and Bradford Extension Railway to Colne, linking to the Lancashire and Yorkshire Railway (L&YR) to Preston

The main line continues:

- Gargrave
- Bell Busk, for Malham (closed 1959)
  - here is the junction for the L&YR line to Blackburn
- Hellifield: here was a locomotive shed
- Long Preston
  - Settle Junction – here the Settle–Carlisle line, opened for freight 1875, passengers 1 May 1876, continues.

=== Settle Junction–Lancaster ===
The original main line to Lancaster had the following stations:

- Giggleswick
- Clapham – here was the junction for Ingleton and an end-on junction with the Ingleton branch line via Sedbergh to Low Gill on the London and North Western Railway (LNW) West Coast Main Line (WCML). The line was frequently used as an alternative through route when the Settle-Carlisle main line was blocked. It was opened from Ingleton by the Lancaster and Carlisle Railway in 1861: the route was closed to passenger traffic on 1 February 1954 and completely in 1966.
- Bentham
- Wennington – here the route divided, with the Furness and Midland Joint Railway connecting with the original NWR/Midland line. The latter continued to:
  - Hornby (closed 1957)
  - Caton (closed 1961)
  - Halton (closed 1966)
  - Lancaster Green Ayre
  - Scale Hall (1957–66)
  - At Morecambe, the line divided: a triangular junction for the following lines:
    - Morecambe Harbour, opened 12 June 1848 (later replaced by Morecambe Northumberland St and subsequently Morecambe Promenade) – and the branch to
    - Heysham Harbour, including a station for Middleton Road Heysham.
  - the line was electrified, as Britain's first overhead high tension AC electrification, in 1908.

Trains now continue via Carnforth, with stations at:

- Melling (closed 1952)
- Arkholme (closed 1960)
- Borwick (closed 1960)
- Carnforth – here the line joins the Furness line and then the WCML.
- Lancaster
- Bare Lane
- Morecambe

== Loss of services ==
The line has only existed in its current form since January 1966 – prior to this the Leeds to Morecambe service used the 'Little ' North Western Railway route via Lancaster, with the Furness & Midland Joint line to Carnforth served mainly by through carriages detached from/attached to main line trains at Wennington (although a small number of local trains operated between there and Carnforth only).

The Beeching Report of 1963 deemed this service pattern unsatisfactory and proposed that services be 'modified', with the original route from Wennington to Lancaster and Morecambe eventually being closed in favour of the F&MJ line on 3 January 1966. From that date all trains ran Carnforth, the WCML, Hest Bank North Junction and the former LNWR Morecambe branch line to reach their destination. This routing had one major drawback in that travellers could no longer reach Lancaster directly, instead having to change at Carnforth onto Furness line services – a situation that would remain unchanged until the early 1980s. The service was by now operated by DMUs as an extension of the Leeds to Skipton commuter route, with a train every two hours for most of the day (the BR timetable of 1975 had seven trains per day running in each direction on weekdays and three or four on Sundays depending on the time of year). All stations between Skipton and Carnforth (except Hellifield) were reduced to unstaffed halt status in October 1970, when 'Pay Train' working was introduced. The line was also used by several freight trains each day, including train loads of ammonia from Teesside to the ICI plant at Heysham and bitumen from Stanlow to a distribution plant at Skipton. Steam-hauled charter specials also appeared on the line from time to time from the mid-seventies onwards, running to and from the Steamtown museum at Carnforth.

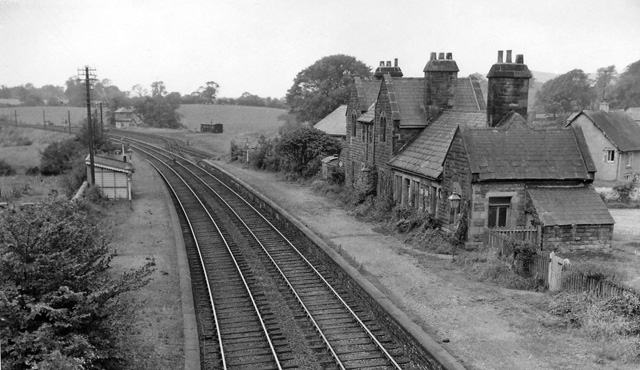
Borwick Station in 1962

From 1982 however the line's timetable was modified, with several services speeded up (by omitting the intermediate station calls north of Skipton) and diverted to run via Lancaster to provide connections into and out of WCML trains to and from Carlisle & Glasgow. This was due to the controversial decision to reroute Nottingham–Glasgow trains away from the Settle–Carlisle line as part of BR's ongoing plan to close it. Had these plans come to fruition, the route would also have been used by a twice-daily replacement Leeds–Carlisle service via the WCML which would have reversed in the loops immediately south of Carnforth station (details were provided in the 'Heads of Information' document issued by BR to all objectors to the 1983 closure proposals). This new timetable restored the direct link between Lancaster and Leeds for the first time in more than fifteen years and also brought upgraded rolling stock to the route in the shape of Class 123 and Class 124 DMUs formerly used on Hull–Manchester Trans-Pennine services. The benefits though were mainly overlooked due to the circumstances in which they were introduced (most rail users considered the new services to be poor substitutes for the direct Leeds to Glasgow trains they replaced) and also the increase in journey times to and from Morecambe caused by the Lancaster re-routing (and subsequent curtailment there when locomotive-hauled stock took over for a short time in the mid-eighties).

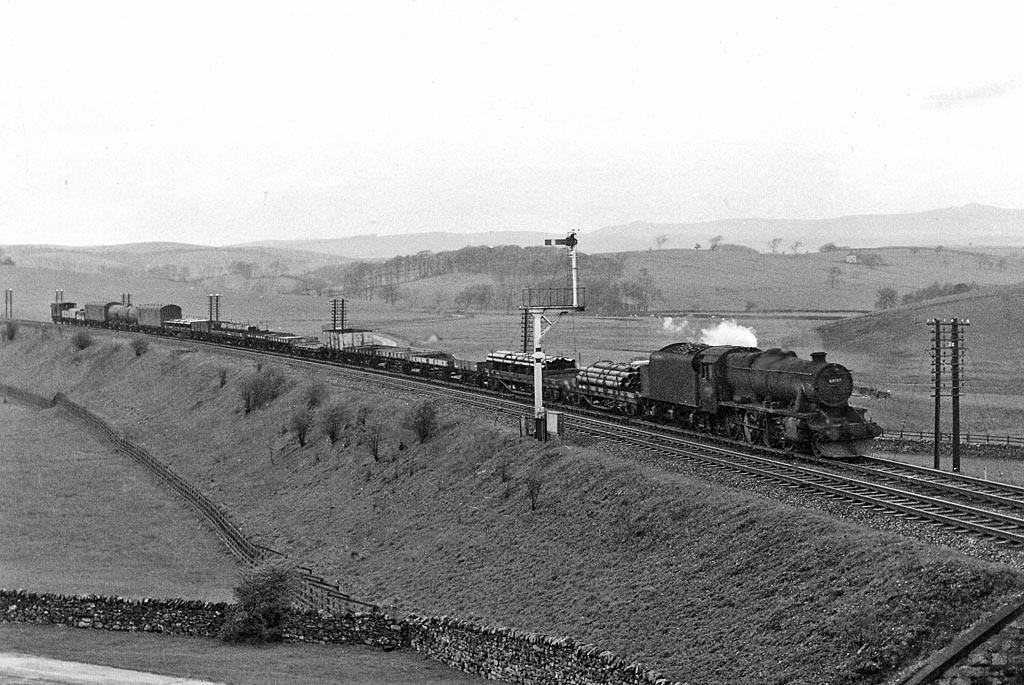
Up freight train near Bell Busk in 1961

Freight services on the route ended in 1990 following the closure of the Heysham chemical plant and the loss of the Stanlow–Skipton bitumen traffic to road, leaving the Leeds to Lancaster/Morecambe passenger service as the only user of the route (apart from occasional steam excursions and empty coaching stock transfers) – a situation that remains unchanged to the present day. The timetable has also undergone further alterations in recent years, including the ending of the semi-fast trains and the routing of all services via Lancaster in May 1987. The biggest change though came in 1990–91, when a DMU shortage led to BR summarily cutting the service frequency almost in half – from seven trains each way per day to just four, of which only one ran beyond Lancaster. This prompted the formation of the Lancaster & Skipton Rail Users Group later the same year to help promote the route and campaign for service improvements. An extra weekday train in each direction was subsequently added in May 1995 (bringing the total to five) and through running to Morecambe restored, but despite the efforts of the user group and the various local authorities along the line (which had its own Community Rail partnership set up in 2006 and was formally designated as a Community rail line in October 2012), the current service frequency remains less than ideal with large gaps (of up to four hours) between trains.

== Current services ==
Since the December 2019 timetable change, services on the line have been operated by Class 158 DMUs; previously, Class 144 and 142 Pacer units were used, along with occasional Class 150 units.

The 2008 Network Rail plan for the route involved new signalling (there are currently no intermediate signals anywhere between Settle Junction and Carnforth, the block section of more than 24 miles being the longest in the country and a consequent constraint on capacity) and other improvements for the sections of the line beyond Skipton. Carlisle services would be increased to a basic two-hour pattern with extra services to 'fill in the gaps' at peak times during the day to give a 1 train per hour frequency.

The current mid-morning Leeds to Morecambe train (and corresponding return service in the afternoon) was extended to Heysham Harbour from the December 2008 timetable change. This reinstated the direct service between Leeds/Skipton and beyond and Heysham that last ran more than 30 years ago. The Sunday service on the line was also enhanced at the start of the new May 2011 timetable, with the two trains that used to run only during the summer months extended to operate right through until the end of the timetable period in December.

In the new Northern franchise, won by Arriva Rail North and which started in April 2016, there will be an increase in services between Leeds and Lancaster, up from four trains westbound and five trains eastbound currently to seven in each direction on weekdays/Saturdays and five on Sundays. These trains will stop at all intermediate stations and will include trains at suitable times for commuters working in both Leeds and Lancaster. There will also be a later last train from Leeds on weekdays. The new services will be introduced at the May 2018 timetable change. Northern has also stated its intention to upgrade facilities at various stations on the route over the next few years - these will include the provision of customer information screens, LED lighting, video help points and self-service ticket machines at each location. Work on these improvements has been ongoing throughout 2019 and should be complete by early 2020.

The improved timetable took effect from 20 May 2018 - though the overall service frequency has improved, the number of through trains beyond Lancaster had actually fallen slightly (from four to three) whilst the Heysham direct service has been withdrawn (passengers now have to change at Lancaster). The May 2019 timetable has addressed this issue by introducing two additional through trains to/from Morecambe and an extra departure from Leeds in the a.m peak, returning from Morecambe mid-morning. The latter now originates at Bradford Forster Square rather than Leeds.

== Freight artery ==
A recent report by Modern Railways claimed that a solid hourly service would operate on the line as far as Long Preston, but would serve Carlisle and Lancaster alternately. It may also become a freight artery to improve capacity on the West Coast Main Line.

== See also ==
- Other services partly sharing this route's tracks:
  - Airedale line (Leeds–Skipton)
  - Settle–Carlisle line (Leeds–Settle)
  - West Coast Main Line (Carnforth–Lancaster)
  - Morecambe branch line (Lancaster–Morecambe)
- Original railway companies:
  - Leeds and Bradford Railway (Leeds–Shipley)
  - Leeds and Bradford Extension Railway (Shipley–Skipton)
  - "Little" North Western Railway (Skipton–Wennington – and dismantled Lunesdale line)
  - Furness and Midland Joint Railway (Wennington–Carnforth)
  - Lancaster and Carlisle Railway (Carnforth–Morecambe)
