= Morecambe branch line =

Overview
- Status: Operational
- Owner: Network Rail
- Locale: Lancaster, Lancashire, North West England
- Termini: Lancaster; Heysham Port

Service
- System: National Rail

Technical
- Number of tracks: 2 bidirectional single-track lines
- Track gauge: 1,435 mm (4 ft 8 1/2 in) standard gauge
Route map
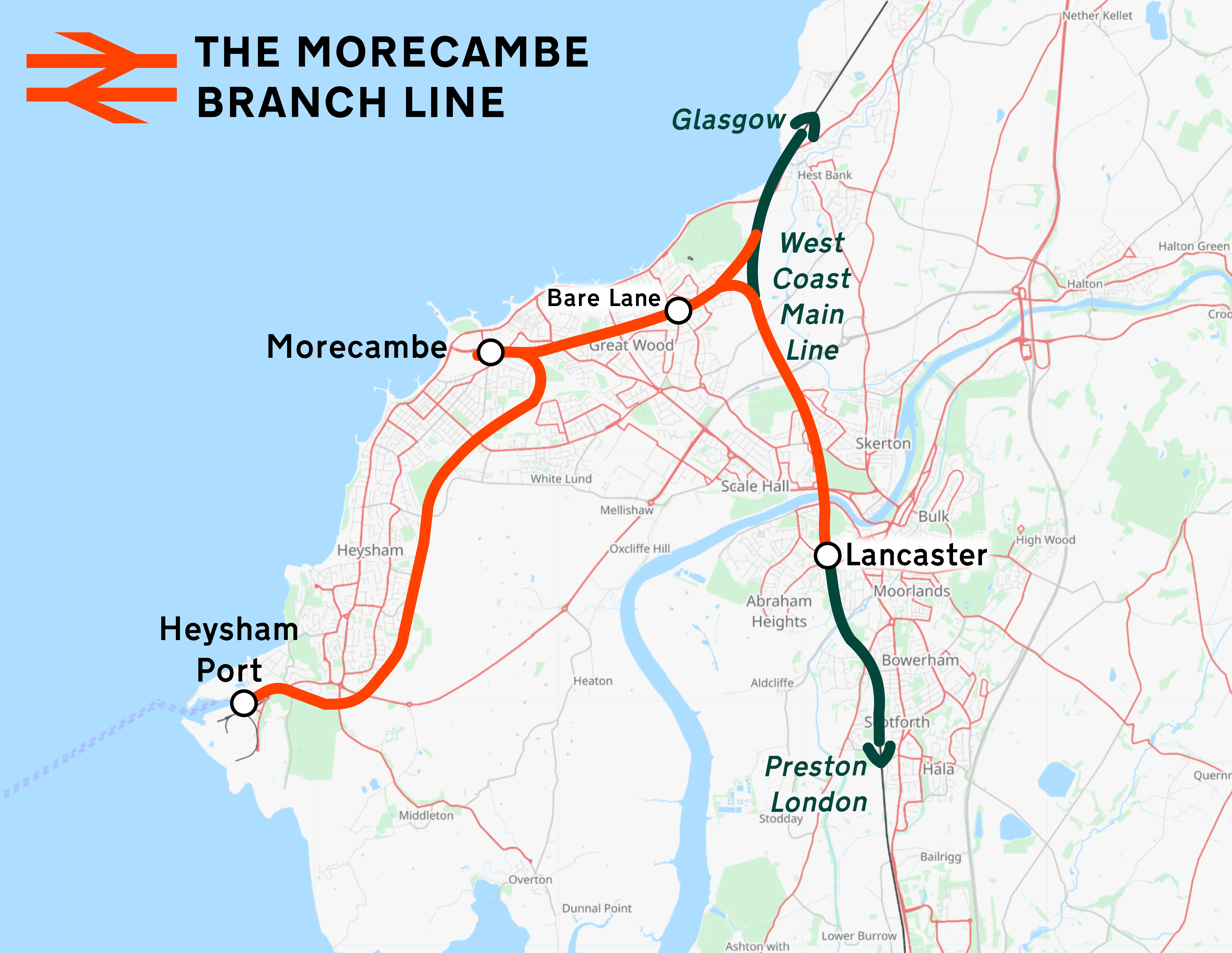
(Click to expand)

The Morecambe branch line is a railway line in Lancashire, England, running from Lancaster to Morecambe and Heysham, where trains connect with ferries to Douglas, Isle of Man. To reach Heysham, trains must reverse at Morecambe.

Almost all passenger services are operated by Northern. Most are shuttles between Lancaster and Morecambe, with only a limited service through to Heysham to connect with the ferries, primarily using Class 156 diesel multiple units. A few services continue beyond Lancaster to Skipton and Leeds (see Leeds–Morecambe line), and generally use Class 150 and (since December 2019) Class 158 units.

Since 1994, the two tracks between Bare Lane and Morecambe have been operated as two independent single lines, with no connection between them beyond Bare Lane. Only the southern line is connected to the Heysham branch.

The line also sees freight trains operated by Direct Rail Services, which serve Heysham nuclear power station.

== History ==
=== Early years ===
The route is a fusion of lines opened by the London and North Western Railway (LNWR), the "little" North Western Railway (NWR) and the Midland Railway, which built the branch to Heysham Harbour and Morecambe Promenade terminus after it took over the NWR in 1874.

The first proposals for a branch from Morecambe to the Lancaster and Carlisle Railway (L&C) at Hest Bank were put forward by the Morecambe Harbour and Railway Company (a constituent company of the NWR) in 1846 but these were soon dropped on cost grounds. The L&C revived the scheme in 1858, with the intention of using the NWR's harbour facilities (suitably expanded) to export coke & iron ore from the North East, brought in via the South Durham & Lancashire Union Railway and the L&C main line. The NWR opposed the plans as it would lose its monopoly on traffic into the town, but its shaky finances eventually led it to reach an agreement with the L&C that would allow the latter to build its line but not require the associated harbour improvements to be carried out. The three-mile branch, including a link to the NWR station at Northumberland Street, was opened in August 1864. The hoped-for mineral traffic did not materialise and the route remained a modest branch, although the LNWR did have to provide its own station at Poulton Lane from November 1870 because of increasing congestion at Northumberland Street. This was replaced by a rather more substantial terminus at nearby Euston Road in 1886 as part of an improvement scheme that also saw the construction of a west-to-south curve from Bare Lane to join the WCML at Morecambe South Junction (opened in 1888), which permitted through running to Lancaster Castle without the need for a reversal, and hence gave access for longer-distance trains to places such as Manchester, Liverpool and London. The branch was also doubled (apart from the Hest Bank to Bare Lane curve) and a regular local service introduced between Euston Road and Lancaster Castle to complement that to/from Hest Bank. Despite these improvements and a journey time similar to the older route, the Midland line continued to carry most of the traffic to and from the town, especially after it was electrified in 1908 (see below).

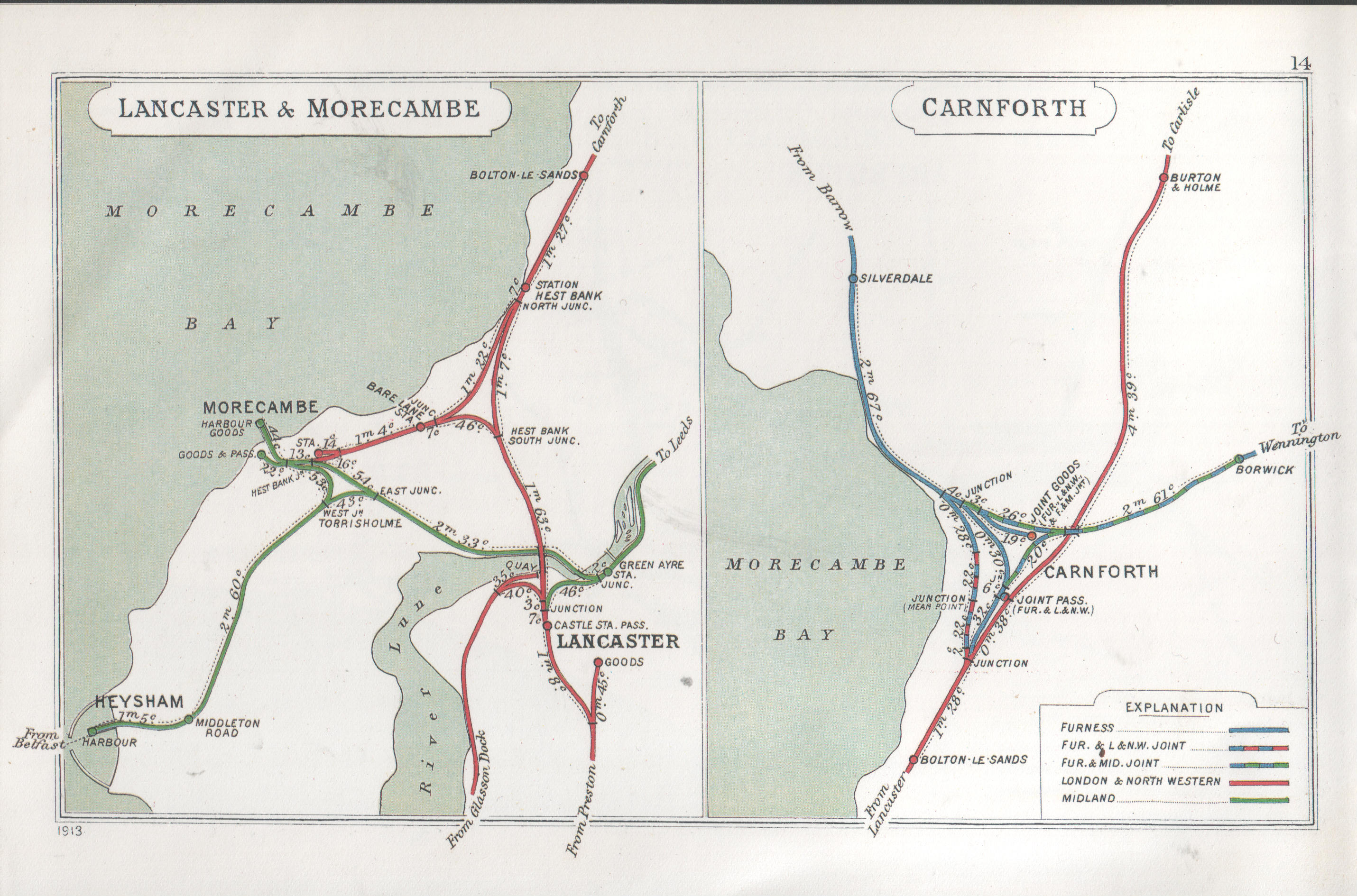
Railways around Lancaster and Morecambe in 1913

The branch became more important after the 1923 Grouping, with a London Euston to Heysham boat train commencing in 1928 – this ran to Promenade station, where it reversed for its journey to Heysham to meet the Belfast boat. Euston Road remained much quieter than Promenade for most of the year, though it did come into its own in the summer months when the regular local trains to Lancaster, Windermere and Barrow-in-Furness were supplemented by a large number of seasonal through trains to destinations such as Glasgow Central, Crewe, Birmingham New Street, Manchester Victoria and London Euston.

==== Electrification ====
The Midland line was used for an early trial of electrification, opened between 13 April and 14 September 1908 using 6600 V AC at 25 Hz. In 1953, it was converted to 50 Hz as a trial, and this experiment led to the 25 kV, 50 Hz system becoming standard for new electrification. Latterly, former LNWR Euston to Watford EMUs ran on the Morecambe and Heysham line, converted to AC overhead operation. The branch remained electrified until it closed in 1966.

=== Decline ===
Though Morecambe remained a popular resort after the nationalisation of the railway system in 1948, post-war road competition began to take its toll on traffic levels and by the late 1950s British Railways decided to concentrate services at the former Midland station. Scheduled trains were diverted to Promenade from 15 September 1958, but Euston Road remained in seasonal use (summer months only) for several more years – the 1959 Saturday timetable from there listed no fewer than 26 arrivals and 23 departures, including trains to Glasgow, Birmingham New Street, Preston, Stockport, Uttoxeter, Manchester Exchange and Workington. This was in addition to the usual scheduled services to/from Promenade. The station eventually closed to passengers at the end of the 1962 summer season (on 8 September), although it was still listed in the 1963 summer timetable (but not actually served in practice) and continued to be used for parcels traffic & carriage stabling until 1965. The neighbouring goods yard remained open for traffic until October 1972.

The biggest changes to the route occurred soon after, as the 1963 Beeching Report recommended that it should be kept open rather than the Midland line to Lancaster Green Ayre, even though the latter was electrified. This proposal was ratified by the Ministry of Transport in August 1965 and on 3 January 1966 the Midland line closed to passenger traffic. An enhanced DMU shuttle to and from Lancaster Castle was introduced over the branch on the same day to replace the withdrawn services via Green Ayre. Trains from Leeds and Skipton were also diverted over the line from this date, using the former Furness and Midland Joint Railway to Carnforth, the WCML to Hest Bank and then the original 1864 north curve to Bare Lane en route to Morecambe. The only ex-Midland facilities to survive were the terminus at Promenade and the 1904 Heysham branch, which was retained to serve the ferry terminal & adjacent nuclear power plant. This lost its passenger trains in October 1975, following the withdrawal of Belfast sailings earlier that year.

=== Recent changes ===
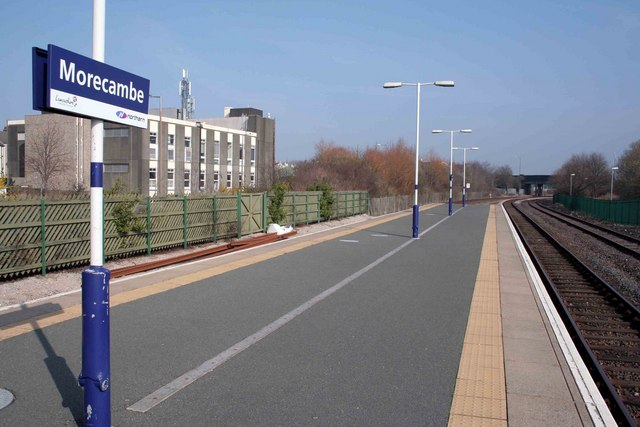
Morecambe railway station platform in March 2009

In May 1987, services from Leeds were diverted to run via Lancaster (with a reversal) rather than directly via Hest Bank, and the Heysham branch was reopened to passengers in connection with the daily sailing to the Isle of Man. Promenade was replaced by a smaller station closer to the town centre in May 1994 and the Heysham line singled under the control of the signal box at Bare Lane. Following signalling renewal work in late 2012, the entire line is now supervised from the PSB at Preston.

== Services ==
All passenger services are operated by Northern, which runs trains slightly more than once per hour in each direction. Most are shuttles between Lancaster and Morecambe, with just one train a day continuing to Heysham to connect with ferries, primarily using Class 156 diesel multiple units. A few services continue beyond Lancaster to Skipton and Leeds (see Leeds–Morecambe line), and generally use Class 158 units.

The first train each weekday was formerly service from Lancaster (though in the past it started back from Barrow) to Windermere which leaves the West Coast Main Line (WCML) at Hest Bank South Junction, called at Bare Lane and reversed at Morecambe, called at Bare Lane again and rejoined the WCML at Hest Bank North Junction and continued to Windermere. It provided a token parliamentary service over the Bare Lane to Hest Bank curve and until April 2016 was operated by TransPennine Express. Prior to the December 2008 timetable change it ran Windermere–Lancaster–Morecambe–Barrow in the late evening. One Monday to Saturday and three Sunday afternoon trains from Morecambe to Leeds were also scheduled to use the curve. Since the May 2019 timetable change, this is now provided by a solitary Mon-Sat early morning train between Lancaster and Morecambe via Carnforth.

== See also ==
- MR electric units
- British Rail Class AM1
