= British Rail Class AM1 =

- In service: 1952-1966
- Manufacturer: Metropolitan Cammell
- Number built: Four sets
- Formation: Driving motor + trailer + driving trailer
- Operators: LNWR; LMS; BR

Specifications
- Electric system: 6.6 kV 50 Hz OHL
- Current collection: Pantograph
- Track gauge: 4 ft 8 1/2 in (1,435 mm) standard gauge

Class AM1 was allocated to the prototype AC electric multiple units, converted from fourth-rail DC electric stock in 1952 and used on the Lancaster/Morecambe/Heysham route. This route had been electrified by the Midland Railway at 6.6 kV, 25 Hz AC. These were withdrawn in 1952 and the service reverted to steam haulage. The line voltage was changed to 6.6 kV at 50 Hz in 1953 and the AM1s were introduced. Thus was a test to see if power could be drawn from the National Grid rather than railway owned power stations. The AM1s were fitted with mercury arc rectifiers but one was later converted in 1955 to 750kW Germanium Rectifier supplied by BTH. This unit were further modified with Silicon Diodes in 1958 which resulted in the original equipment of 600 germanium cells reduced to 192 silicon cells representing a substantial saving in size and weight. The stock was maintained at Meols Cop works near Southport.

The line was closed to passengers and the stock withdrawn in early 1966. Unlike classes AM2-AM11, which became TOPS Classes 302–311, class AM1 was withdrawn before it could take its place in the system as class 301. However, it was the success of these tests that contributed to the decision to choose 25 kV AC overhead electrification as standard in Great Britain outside the Southern Region.

== History ==
The electric service started on 17 August 1953, and the trains, very much seen as experimental, ran until 2 January 1966, when they were withdrawn. Each of the four electric trains contained different unique features to test them, and although the original MR electrification equipment, which was still in situ, was used in places, other sections were used for trials of the proposed BR standard electrification features. There was little demand for the service outside the summer holiday season, and the presence of the duplicate former-LNWR route between the Lancaster and Morecambe allowed a replacing diesel service to use that route. The service was complex to operate, for, from the main line ex-LNWR Lancaster Castle station, it ran downhill a short distance to the ex-MR Lancaster Green Ayre station, where trains reversed to run westward along the River Lune to Morecambe Promenade station, where trains reversed again to run to Heysham.

== Previous use ==
The carriages converted to form the prototype units were drawn from former LNWR electric units built in 1914 by the Metropolitan Carriage, Wagon & Finance Company for use on the West London line fourth-rail DC electrification. They had been stored early in World War II after the West London route on which they worked was closed to passengers due to bomb damage. The interiors were modernised with bus-type seating. Driving motor coach 28221 was fitted with a germanium rectifier and displayed at the International Railway Congress, Willesden, London between 26 and 29 May 1954.

== Formations ==
Unit numbers were not allocated, but sets were referred to by the last two digits of the DMBSO number. The numbers of individual carriages were:

	DMBSO	TSO	DTSO
Set 19	M28219M	M29721M	M29021M
Set 20	M28220M	M29722M	M29022M
Set 21	M28221M	M29723M	M29023M
Set 22	M28222M	M29724M	M29024M

== See also ==
- MR electric units
- Morecambe branch line
