= Bolton-le-Sands railway station =

Disused railway station in Bolton-le-sands, Lancashire

Bolton-le-Sands
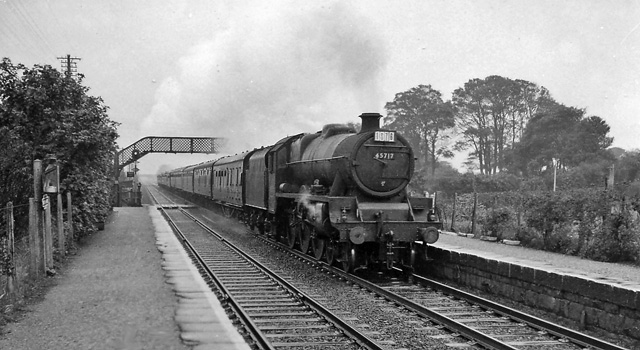
- The station in 1962

General information
- Location: Bolton-le-Sands, Lancashire; England
- Coordinates: 54.107°N 2.7983°W
- Grid reference: SD479682
- Platforms: 2

Other information
- Status: Disused

History
- Original company: Lancaster and Carlisle Railway
- Pre-grouping: London and North Western Railway
- Post-grouping: London, Midland and Scottish Railway

Key dates
- 7 August 1847: Opened as Bolton
- 1861: Name changed to Bolton-le-Sands
- 3 February 1969: Closed
Location

Bolton-le-Sands railway station served the village of Bolton-le-Sands, Lancashire, England, from 1847 to 1969 on the Lancaster and Carlisle Railway.

== History ==
The station opened as Bolton on 7 August 1847 by the Lancaster and Carlisle Railway. Its name was changed to Bolton-le-Sands in 1861 to avoid confusion with other stations of the same name that were open around this time. The station closed on 3 February 1969. The footbridge survived until 2003.

Preceding station	Historical railways	Following station
Carnforth; Line and station open, L&C platforms closed	Lancaster and Carlisle Railway	Hest Bank; Line open, station closed
