= Bare Lane railway station =

Railway station in Lancashire, England

Bare Lane
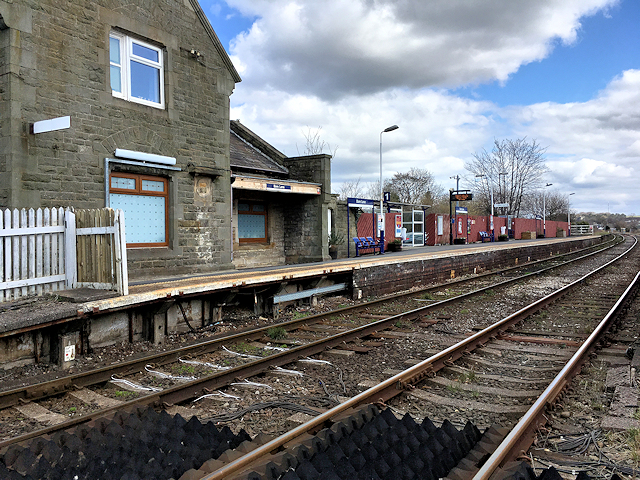

General information
- Location: Bare, City of Lancaster; England
- Coordinates: 54°04′29″N 2°50′06″W
- Grid reference: SD454646
- Owner: Network Rail
- Manager: Northern Trains
- Platforms: 2
- Tracks: 2

Other information
- Station code: BAR
- Classification: DfT category F1

History
- Original company: London and North Western Railway
- Pre-grouping: London and North Western Railway
- Post-grouping: London, Midland and Scottish Railway; British Rail (London Midland Region)

Key dates
- 8 August 1864: Opened as Skerton
- 31 October 1864: Renamed Bare Lane

Passengers
- 2020/21: ▼50,502
- 2021/22: ▲91,640
- 2022/23: ▲0.113 million
- 2023/24: ▼0.110 million
- 2024/25: ▲0.119 million
Location
- Location within the City of Lancaster district Location within Lancashire
Notes
- Passenger statistics from the Office of Rail and Road

Bare Lane is a railway station on the Morecambe Branch Line, which runs between Lancaster and Heysham Port. The station, situated 2 1/2 miles (4 km) west of Lancaster, serves the suburb of Bare in Morecambe, Lancashire. It is owned by Network Rail and managed by Northern Trains.

== History ==
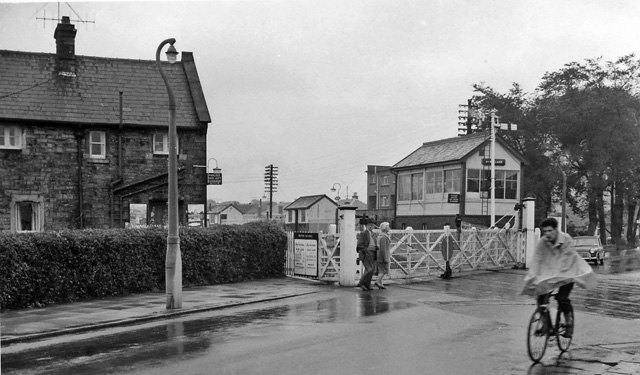
The station, as photographed in September 1962

The station was opened as Poulton-le-Sands on 8 August 1864 by the London and North Western Railway; it was renamed Bare Lane on 31 October 1864.

A level crossing with the public highway, known as Bare Lane, exists immediately to the west of the station; until recently, it was controlled by the adjacent Bare Lane signal box, a fringe cabin to the Preston PSB Area. This box was closed on 8 December 2012, when the signalling equipment was renewed by Network Rail and control of the crossing switched to CCTV and transferred to Preston power box.

The old station building on the platform is now a private dwelling. It was auctioned to the public and was featured in the ninth series of the BBC programme Homes Under the Hammer, a show about buildings which are auctioned to the public and redeveloped.

== Layout ==
Although the station has two side platforms, the track layout through it is not the conventional double track used on most main & secondary routes, but two independent bi-directional single lines. Platform 1 serves the Up & Down Morecambe line (which is in effect a long siding all the way to the terminus), whilst platform 2 handles trains on what is now the Up & Down Heysham line. The latter is connected to the now-single track branch down to Heysham Port at Holt Bank Junction (just outside Morecambe station), with the junction points operated from a ground frame worked by the train crew. The two lines converge east of the station, but then immediately split into the single line curves toward Hest Bank and towards Lancaster; the former sees only limited use, whereas the latter was double track until 1988 and is used by the vast majority of trains on the route.

This layout dates from the closure of the former terminus at Morecambe Promenade and its associated signal box in February 1994, with Bare Lane signal box taking over control of all signalling on the line thereafter (other than that controlling the junctions with the main line at Hest Bank). As mentioned above however, it was closed in December 2012. The structure remained intact for another year and had been used for several months by Northern personnel as a staffed help point for travellers due to the absence of digital passenger information screens at the station. It was eventually demolished in January 2014 after the PIS screens were installed and finally brought into use.

The station is unstaffed and had no ticket facilities of any kind until recently - Northern has now installed a ticket vending machine as part of a programme of station improvements in the area. Waiting shelters are provided and both platforms have step-free access.

== Services ==
The station is served by Northern Trains local services, which operate as a regular (hourly with some peak extras) Lancaster-Morecambe shuttle. One return service throughout the week is extended to and from Heysham Port to meet the daily ferry to the Isle of Man.

There are also a few longer-distance services (currently five per day Mon-Sat and on Sundays also since December 2019) from Morecambe to Skipton and Leeds via the Leeds to Morecambe Line. In addition, for many years the last train each weekday evening was a First TransPennine Express service from Windermere, which diverted from its route to Barrow-in-Furness. This service called at Lancaster, Bare Lane and Morecambe, before reversing, calling at Bare Lane again, then rejoining the West Coast Main Line and continuing via Carnforth, thus avoiding the 1m 7ch section of the WCML between Hest Bank South Junction and Hest Bank North Junction. This was the only scheduled service to use the original 1864 curve towards Hest Bank and, as such, functioned as a Parliamentary train to avoid the need for formal closure proceedings for this short stretch of line. In the present (May 2025) timetable, just one early morning Lancaster to Morecambe via Carnforth train takes this route to meet the TOC's franchise obligations.

| Preceding station | National Rail | Following station |
|---|---|---|
| Carnforth | Northern Trains; Morecambe Branch Line | Morecambe |
| Lancaster | Northern Trains; Morecambe Branch Line | Morecambe |
| | Historical railways | |
| Lancaster Castle | London and North Western Railway; Morecambe Branch Line | Morecambe Euston Road |
| Hest Bank | London and North Western Railway; Morecambe Branch Line | Morecambe Promenade |
