= Middleton Road Bridge Halt railway station =

Short-lived station in Lancashire, England

Middleton Road Bridge Halt

General information
- Location: Middleton, Lancashire; England
- Coordinates: 54.0333°N 2.8953°W
- Platforms: 2

Other information
- Status: Disused

History
- Original company: Midland Railway
- Pre-grouping: Midland Railway

Key dates
- 11 July 1904: Opened
- June 1905: Closed
Location
- Location within the City of Lancaster district Location within Lancashire

Middleton Road Bridge Halt was one mile northwest of the village of Middleton, Lancashire, England, open from 1904 to 1905 on the North Western Line of the Midland Railway.

== History ==
The station opened on 11 July 1904 by the Midland Railway. It closed in June 1905.

Preceding station	Historical railways	Following station
Morecambe Promenade; Line open, station closed	Midland Railway; North Western Line	Heysham Harbour; Line and station open
