= MR electric units =

- In service: 1908-1953
- Number built: 3 x 4 car sets
- Formation: 4 cars

The Midland Railway experimented with electrification on its Heysham–Morecambe–Lancaster line in Lancashire, England. Electric trains started to run over this route in 1908, using the overhead 6.6 kV, 25 Hz AC electric supply installed and generated at the MR's own power station in Heysham.

The electric multiple units consisted of three driving motor coaches and six driving trailer coaches. Since the DM cars had a cab at each end, this allowed trains of one, two, or three cars to be formed.

== Driving motors ==
The three DM cars were built by the MR at their Derby Works and were 60 feet (18.29 m) in length. Two had Siemens electrical equipment fitted, while the third had Westinghouse equipment.

- LMS numbers for the motor coaches 28610–28612

== Driving trailers ==
Of the six DT cars, four were built new by the MR at their Derby works, while the other two were converted from existing hauled stock compartment coaches.

== Withdrawal ==
In February 1951, these venerable units were finally withdrawn from service. Steam locomotive-hauled trains operated passenger services over the Lancaster–Heysham Line from then until August 1953, when electric trains took over again, this time the prototype Class AM1 units following the installation of the appropriate new equipment.

The line voltage remained at 6,600 but the frequency was altered to 50 Hz and this was transformed and rectified on the trains to supply DC traction motors. This experiment led to the introduction of the 25 kV, 50 Hz system as standard for new electrification on British Railways.

== Sources ==
- Marsden, Colin J. (1985) 100 Years of Electric Traction, Oxford Publishing Company, ISBN 0-86093-325-3
- Ian Allan Ltd (1948) ABC Of British Electric Trains
