= Hest Bank railway station =

Former railway station in Lancashire, England

Hest Bank
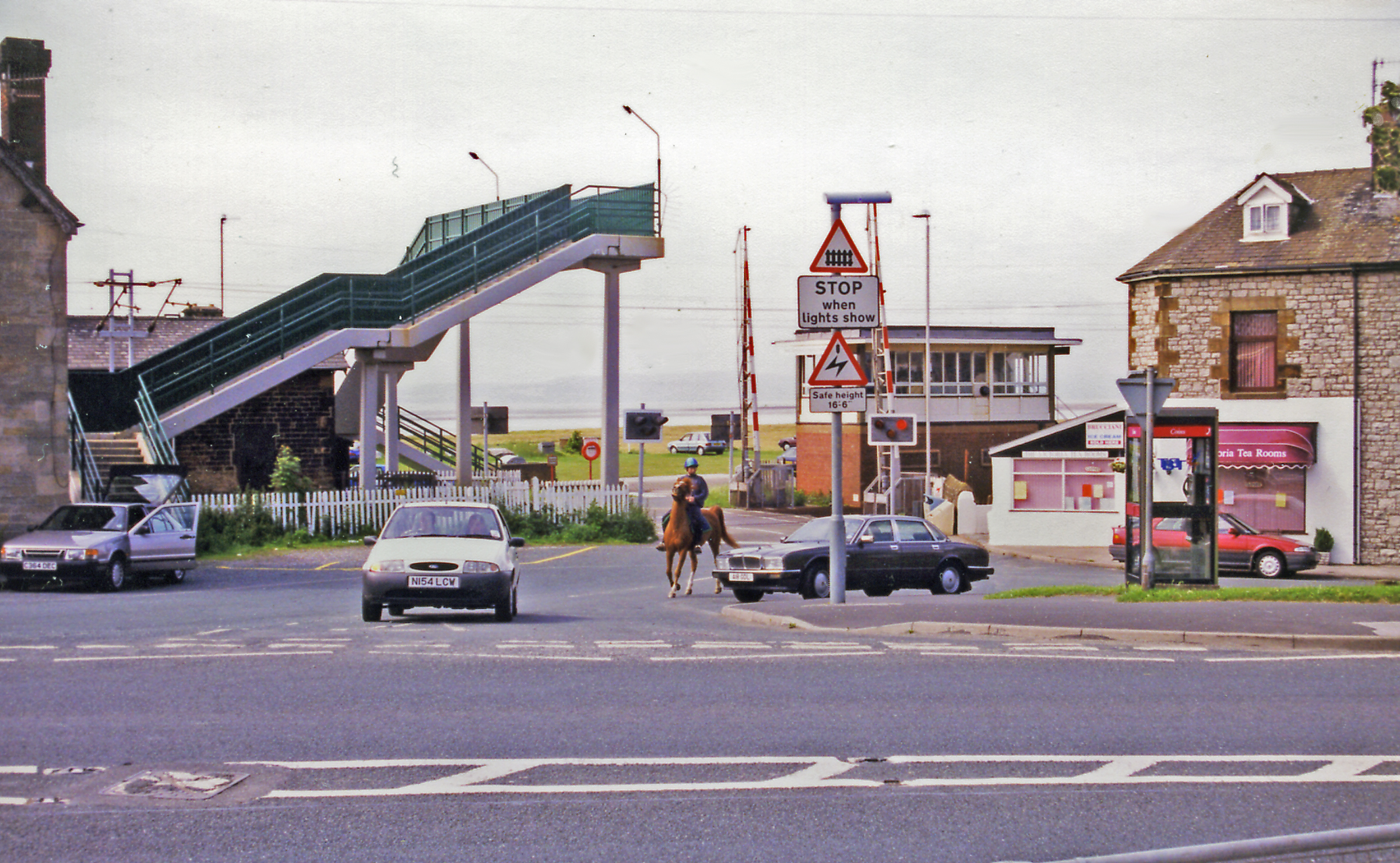
- Location of the station (1998)

General information
- Location: Hest Bank, Lancashire, Lancaster; England
- Coordinates: 54.09160°N 2.81486°W
- Platforms: 3

Other information
- Status: Disused

History
- Original company: Lancaster and Carlisle Railway
- Pre-grouping: London and North Western Railway
- Post-grouping: London Midland and Scottish Railway

Key dates
- 22 September 1846: station opened
- 3 February 1969: station closed
Location

Hest Bank railway station was opened by the Lancaster and Carlisle Railway (L&CR) three miles north of Lancaster Castle railway station. The line had been authorised in 1844 and a station was proposed for the village of Hest Bank, Lancashire, the following year. It opened in 1846 along with the line. The station continued to serve the village of Hest Bank until its closure in 1969. The site remains notable as being the point at which the present-day West Coast Main Line (WCML) comes nearest to the west coast. Views of Morecambe Bay can be glimpsed from trains on this section of the line.

== History ==
The "little" North Western Railway had been formed to link Skipton to Lancaster and with the Morecambe Harbour and Railway planned to make a junction with the L&CR at Hest Bank. Regrettably this never materialised. Hoping to develop an export trade in coke and other minerals, the L&CR applied on its own account to build the branch to Morecambe, receiving permission in 1859. At this point the line was leased by the London and North Western Railway (LNWR) and it was the latter that built the branch as a double track opening in 1864. In time however the branch was singled, but with an increase in holiday trade a south facing curve was added to the junction during 1888. Later a part of the branch from Bare Lane was redoubled and is still open as the Morecambe Branch Line.

Hest Bank station itself was of rugged stone construction, a two-storey station house with a booking hall below on the up (southbound) platform. It was next to a level crossing over a minor road linking the A589 with houses, a water treatment works and a caravan park further along the foreshore. A small cottage for the crossing keeper was provided on the down (coastal-facing) side along with a footbridge to connect the platforms. The down side also had two sidings, one providing a bay platform.

During the 'thirties the station became remarkable as the only one between Preston and Carlisle with electric lighting, thanks to the ingenuity of a member of staff. Four camping coaches were positioned here by the London Midland Region from 1960 to 1963, then it increased to five until 1969. The goods yard closed on 2 December 1963 but the tracks were used for the camping coaches until the end of the 1969 season despite the station finally closing to passengers in February 1969.

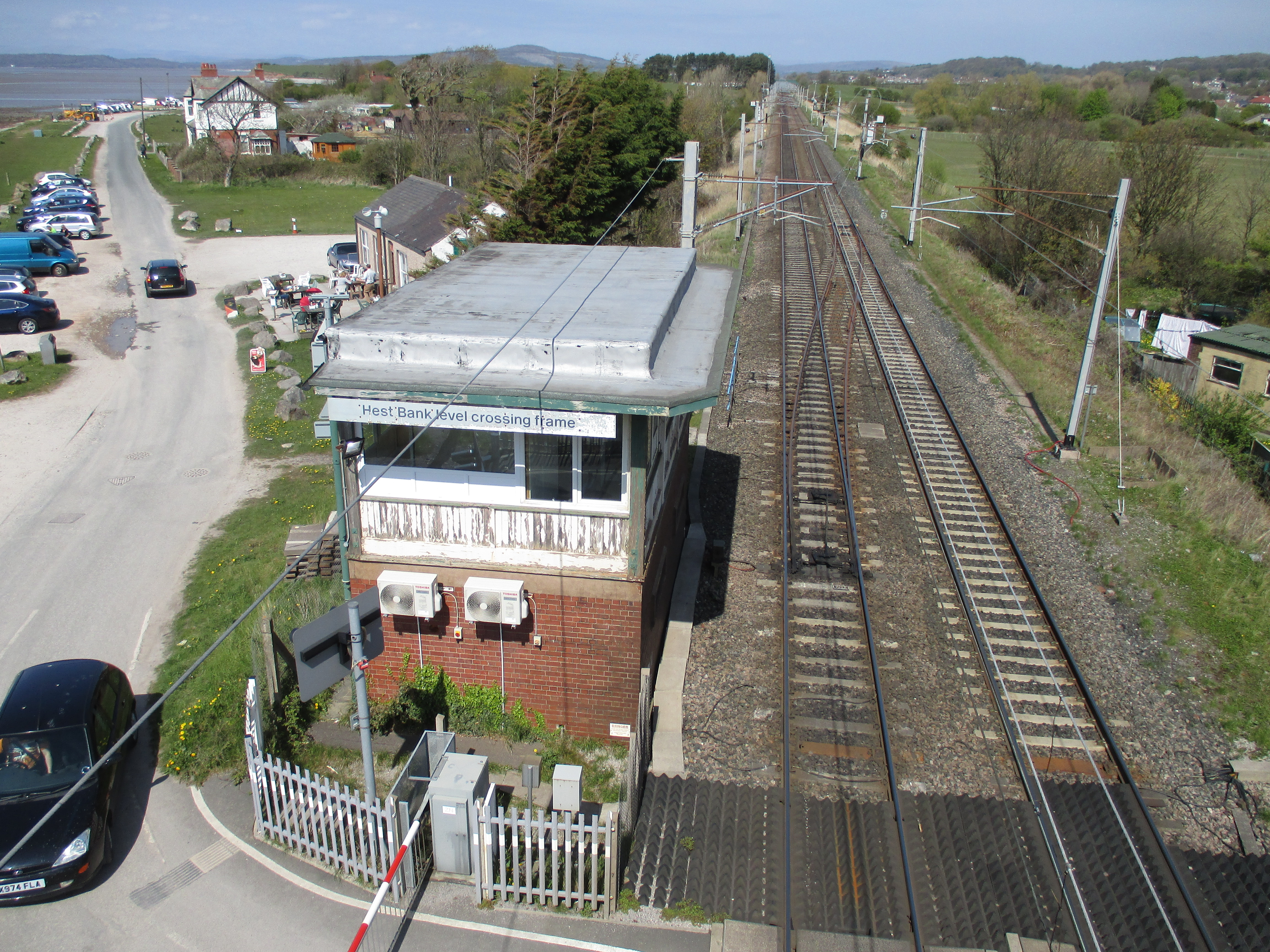
The signal box at Hest Bank

All traces of the platforms and buildings have disappeared (though the crossing keeper's cottage survived until 2012), as the incoming Morecambe branch was extended along the length of one of the former platforms as part of the layout changes associated with the 1973 WCML electrification scheme.

The role of the signal box, purely as a manually controlled gate box to supervise the adjacent level crossing and that at nearby Bolton-le-Sands, was brought to an end in 2013. NR had published proposals to close the box here initially at the end of 2012, which was briefly postponed until February 2013 before the work was finally carried out in May. Both crossings are now worked direct from Preston PSB using CCTV. The signal box has now been converted for use as a classroom.

Preceding station	Historical railways	Following station
Lancaster; Line and station open	Lancaster and Carlisle Railway	Bolton-le-Sands; Line open, station closed
