= Morecambe railway station =

Railway station in Lancashire, England

Morecambe
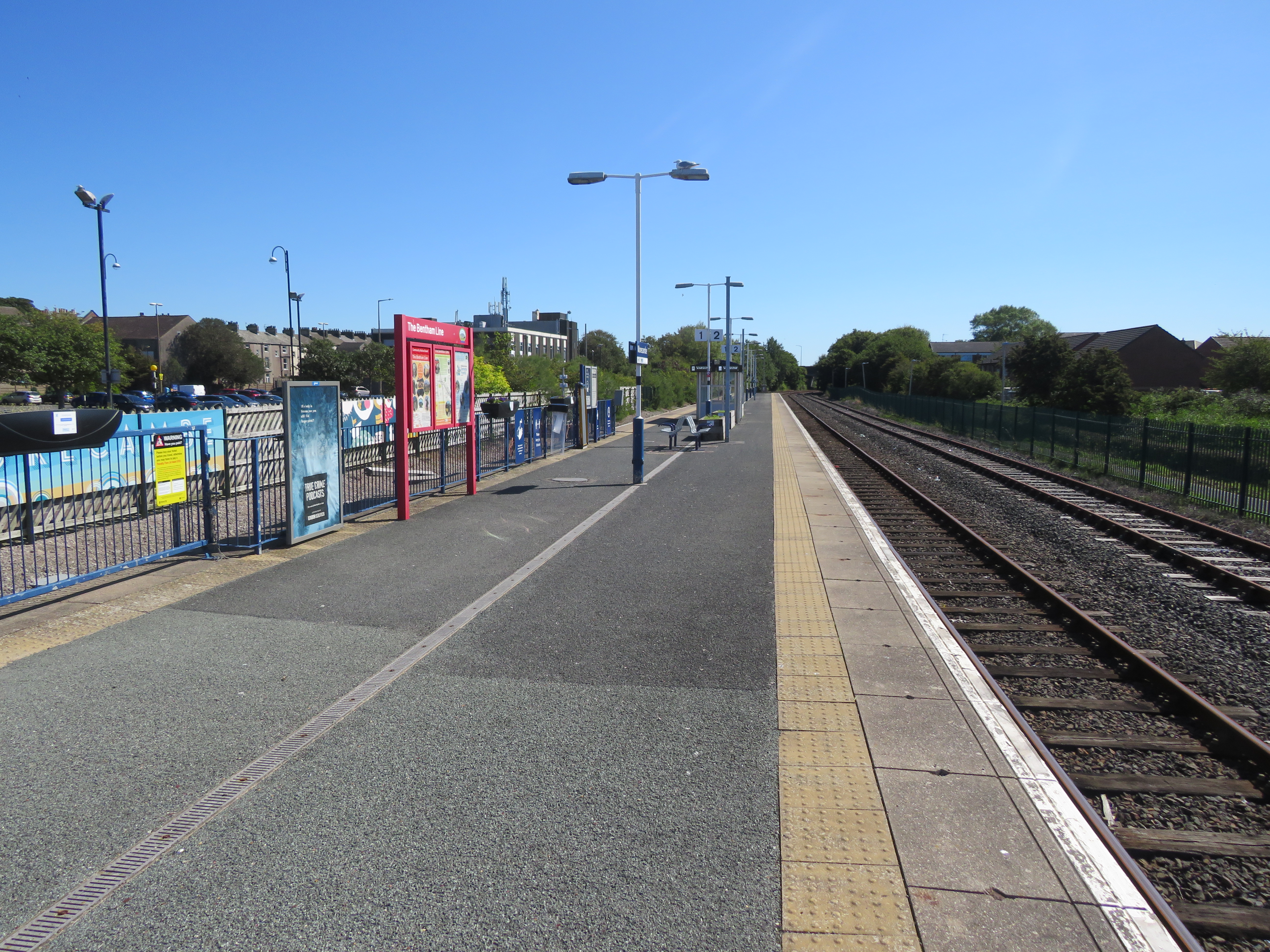

General information
- Location: Morecambe, City of Lancaster; England
- Coordinates: 54°04′13″N 2°52′07″W
- Grid reference: SD432641
- Owner: Network Rail
- Manager: Northern Trains
- Platforms: 2
- Tracks: 3 (1 bay platform)

Other information
- Station code: MCM
- Classification: DfT category F1

History
- Original company: Railtrack

Key dates
- 29 May 1994: Opened

Passengers
- 2020/21: ▼44,778
- 2021/22: ▲0.147 million
- 2022/23: ▲0.165 million
- 2023/24: ▼0.164 million
- 2024/25: ▲0.175 million
Location
- Location within Morecambe Location within the City of Lancaster district Location within Lancashire
Notes
- Passenger statistics from the Office of Rail and Road

Morecambe is a railway station on the Morecambe Branch Line, which runs between Lancaster and Heysham Port. The station, situated 4 miles (6 km) west of Lancaster, serves the town of Morecambe in Lancashire. It is owned by Network Rail and managed by Northern Trains.

== History ==
The current truncated two-platform station was opened on 29 May 1994, replacing the Midland Railway's earlier terminus, Morecambe Promenade, which was situated 400 m (440 yd) further west, closer to the town's seafront.

The old station building remains in use as a pub and restaurant, but its platforms have been demolished and the site is now occupied by a cinema and the Morecambe indoor market. That station was itself a replacement for the North Western Railway's original two-platform terminus at Northumberland Street, which opened in 1851 and closed in March 1907. It was located almost exactly on the same site as the current station and ticket office.

== Facilities ==
A diagram of the current track layout, which was heavily rationalised since the closure of Promenade station in 1994

Terminating passenger services usually run into platform 1; however, trains to/from Heysham must use the platform 2 line in order to reverse and gain access to the single track Heysham branch. The lines to platforms 1 and 2 connect 1.6 miles (2.6 km) away at a junction east of Bare Lane station. Services access the Heysham section by means of a ground frame at the junction, which is released by Preston signalling centre (which has supervised the branch since the closure of Bare Lane signal box in December 2012) and operated by the train crew.

The ticket office is staffed from the early morning until mid-afternoon, six days per week (closed Sundays). Passengers can purchase tickets or a permit to travel from a ticket vending machine at the station at other times. A waiting shelter is provided, along with a P.A system and digital information screens. There is step-free access to the platform from the station entrance and ticket office.

== Services ==
Northern Trains operate the following services:

- A regular shuttle service to Lancaster
- Five daily longer-distance services to Skipton and Leeds, via the Bentham line.
- A limited service (one each way all week) to Heysham, connecting with the ferry to the Isle of Man. Trains for Heysham must reverse at Morecambe.

The token direct trains to Carnforth that ran up until the summer 2019 timetable change (one early morning Lancaster - Morecambe - Windermere train, plus one weekday and three Sunday services to Leeds) have now been withdrawn. The Parliamentary train legal minimum service for the Bare Lane to Hest Bank North Junction chord is now provided by an early morning train from Lancaster, which runs via Carnforth (reverse) and the curve in question.

Preceding station	National Rail	Following station
Bare Lane	Northern Trains; Morecambe Branch Line	Heysham Port
Bare Lane	Northern Trains; Morecambe Branch Line	Terminus

== Future improvements ==
Northern's franchise agreement (started on 1 April 2016) includes provision for additional trains on the Leeds route - three additional weekday services were introduced from May 2018 (with trains timed to improve commuting and leisure opportunities at either end of the route) and one additional train each way on Sundays (the additional trains however start/terminate at Lancaster).
