= Furness line =

Railway line in North West England

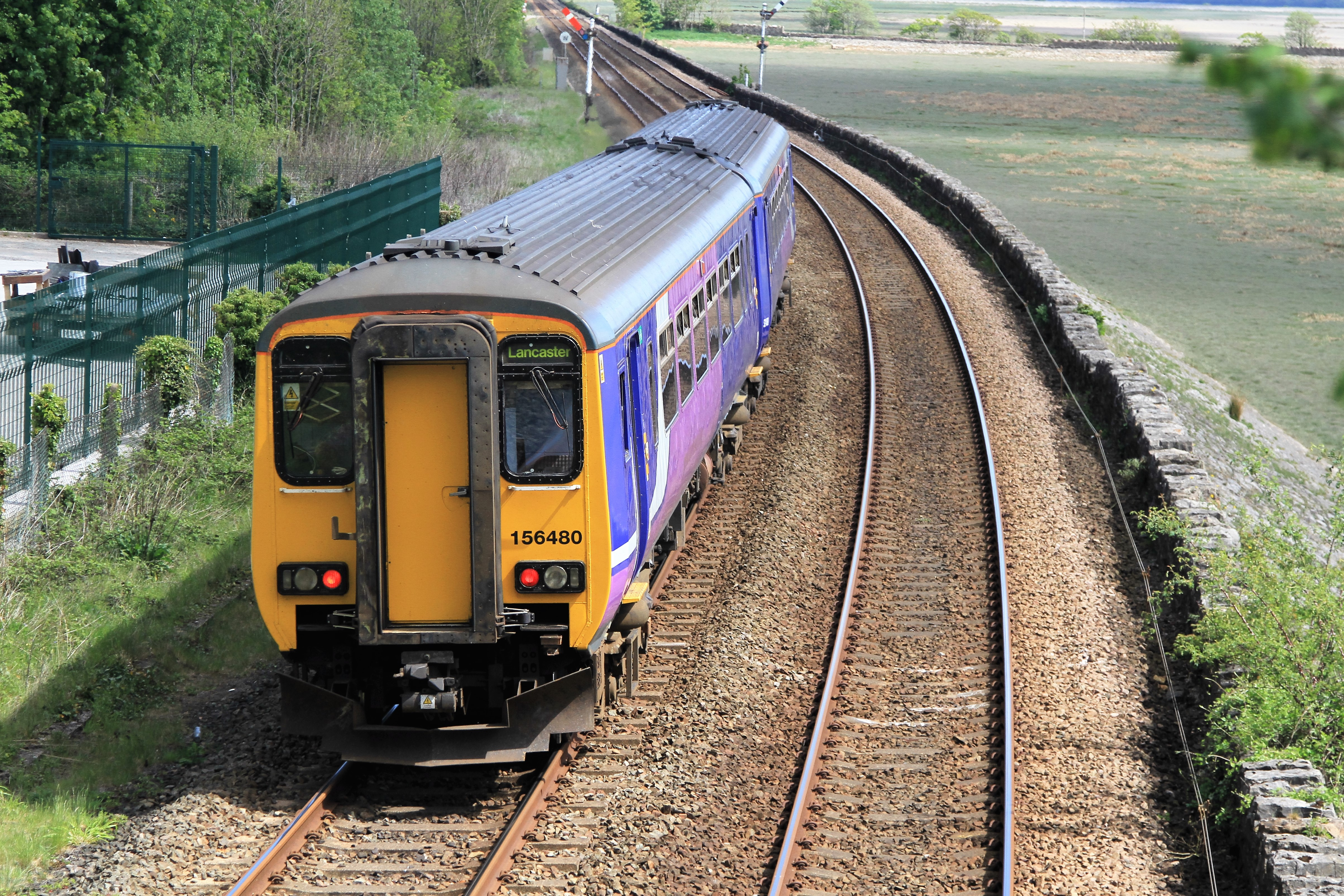
- A Northern Rail Class 156 Super Sprinter rounds a curve near Grange-over-Sands

Overview
- Status: Operational
- Owner: Network Rail
- Locale: Cumbria; Lancashire; Furness; Barrow-in-Furness; North West England
- Termini: Carnforth; Barrow in Furness
- Stations: 10

Service
- Type: Heavy rail, Commuter rail
- System: National Rail
- Operator(s): Northern
- Rolling stock: Class 68 'UKLight'; Class 156 'Super Sprinter'; Class 195 'Civity'

History
- Opened: 1846–1857 (in stages)

Technical
- Line length: 28 mi 45 ch (45.97 km)
- Number of tracks: 2
- Track gauge: 4 ft 8 1/2 in (1,435 mm) standard gauge
- Electrification: 25 kV 50 Hz AC OHLE (Carnforth)
- Operating speed: 60 mph (97 km/h) maximum
Route map
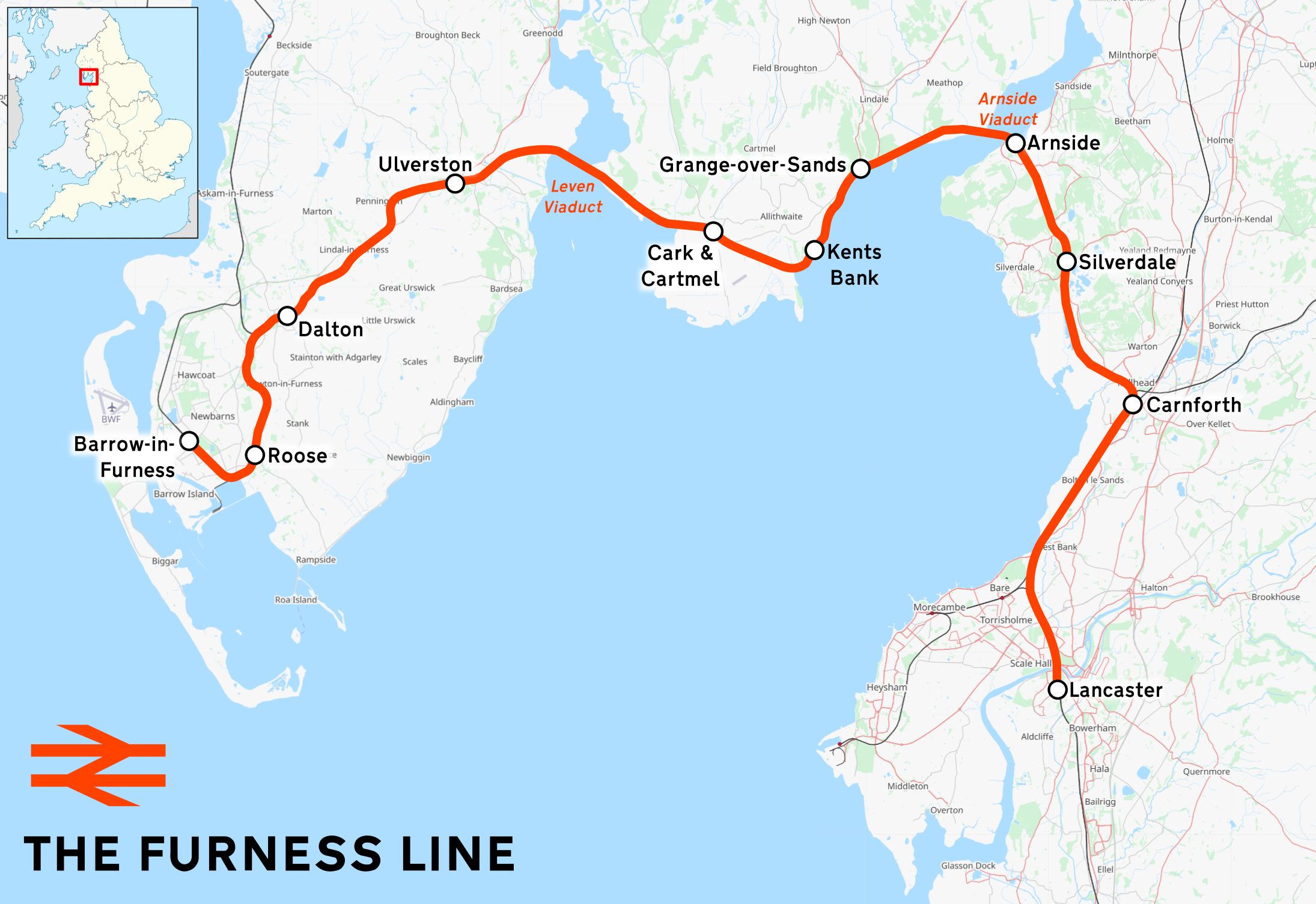
(Click to expand)

The Furness line is a British railway between Barrow-in-Furness and Carnforth, where it joins the West Coast Main Line. It serves various towns along the Furness coast, including Barrow-in-Furness, Ulverston and Grange-over-Sands.

The line serves primarily passenger traffic, with regional rail services operated by Northern from Manchester Airport, Preston and Lancaster. The majority of services along the line terminate at Barrow-in-Furness, however some services continue along the Cumbrian Coast Line to Millom, Whitehaven and Carlisle.

The line also sees regular freight traffic serving the Port of Barrow and Sellafield. The line was designated a community rail partnership by the Department for Transport in 2012.

== History ==
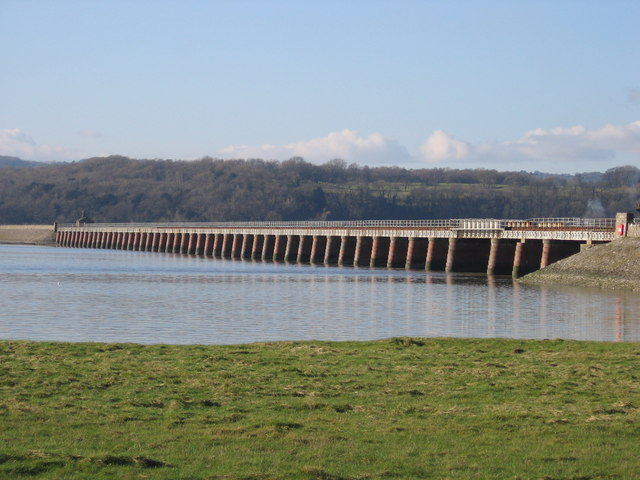
Arnside Viaduct crossing the mouth of the River Kent

The line was opened in stages between 1846 and 1857 to link the mineral industries in the area. The area was very isolated before the railway opened, with the only road crossing to reach the area over Morecambe Bay. The Furness Railway was first proposed in November 1843, linking the slate quarries of Kirkby in Furness and iron ore in the Lindal in Furness area to a deep water berth at Roa Island. It was originally intended to be used solely as a mineral railway, however provisions were made for a branch to Barrow and a link to Ulverston, the largest local town at the time.

The line slowly expanded to link up with what is today the Cumbrian Coast Line, in addition to an extension to Ulverston in 1854. In 1857, the Ulverston and Lancaster Railway completed its route, linking to the Carlisle and Lancaster Railway. The line eventually began to expand, purchasing the Whitehaven and Furness Junction Railway. The railway company eventually refused to purchase the Whitehaven Junction railway, leading to a situation where the Furness Railway was heavily influenced by the London and North Western Railway.

The line continued to develop in the 1880s, especially in the Barrow area. A through station was constructed, removing the need to reverse as was the case at the Strand terminus. A passenger station had been opened at Ramsden Dock a year before to connect with the new Isle of Man and later Belfast steamer services.

=== Early twentieth century ===
In the early 20th century, passenger numbers had continued to decline. As a result, an effort was made to modernise the line as a tourist railway, linking the country to the Lake District. This began a new era for the area, bringing thousands of tourists to Coniston and Windermere.

Under the Big Four, the line was brought under the control of the London, Midland & Scottish Railway on 31 December 1922. The Roa Island branch was closed in 1936, however the rest of the network remained open until the formation of British Railways. The Coniston branch closed in 1962 and the Lakeside branch in 1965, with part of the route being preserved as the Lakeside and Haverthwaite Railway. Sleeper services to London Euston ceased in 1990.

=== Modern era ===
Following the privatisation of British Rail in the 1990s, services were initially transferred to First North Western. First TransPennine Express took over the operation of regional express services to Manchester and Preston in 2004, while local services were transferred to Northern Rail.

Class 37 locomotives hauling Mark 2 carriages were used on the line between May 2015 and May 2018, operating through services along the Cumbrian Coast Line due to a shortage in rolling stock following the move of Class 170 'Turbostar' units to Chiltern Railways. The change was controversial locally as the trains were old, and unreliable. Class 68 locomotives were introduced onto services temporarily in January 2018, until through running of loco-hauled stock ended in May 2018.

In April 2016, operation of all services on the line was transferred to Arriva Rail North, with regional and local services again operated by the same train operating company. Services were operated using a variety of Sprinter diesel multiple units and Class 185 'Desiro' units subleased from TransPennine Express until July 2019. In July 2019, new Class 195 'Civity' units were introduced as part of the new franchise, with an increased number of services to Manchester.

== Incidents ==
On 22 March 2024, a Northern service between Preston and Barrow-in-Furness derailed near Grange-over-Sands. The derailment was the result of a void opening on the embankment on which the train was travelling. The line remained closed until 22 April whilst the train was removed and repairs were completed. Following the incident, the RAIB criticised Network Rail, finding that the void was caused by a temporary flood pipe from 2016 being damaged during routine maintenance.

== Services ==
All services on the line are operated by Northern as part of the Manchester to Cumbria service group. The line has a predominantly hourly service to Manchester Airport, with approximately 1 train per 4 hours terminating short at Lancaster or Preston. Unlike other services operating along the West Coast Main Line, services on the Furness Line do not operate on a clockface timetable, resulting in gaps in service varying between 30 and 90 minutes.

Additional services to Manchester Airport were introduced from July 2019. The new timetable was criticised by local schools due to some services between Barrow and Ulverston being moved earlier.

At Barrow-in-Furness, some services continue along the Cumbrian Coast Line to Millom, Whitehaven and Carlisle.
