= Heysham Port railway station =

Railway station in Lancashire, England

Heysham Port
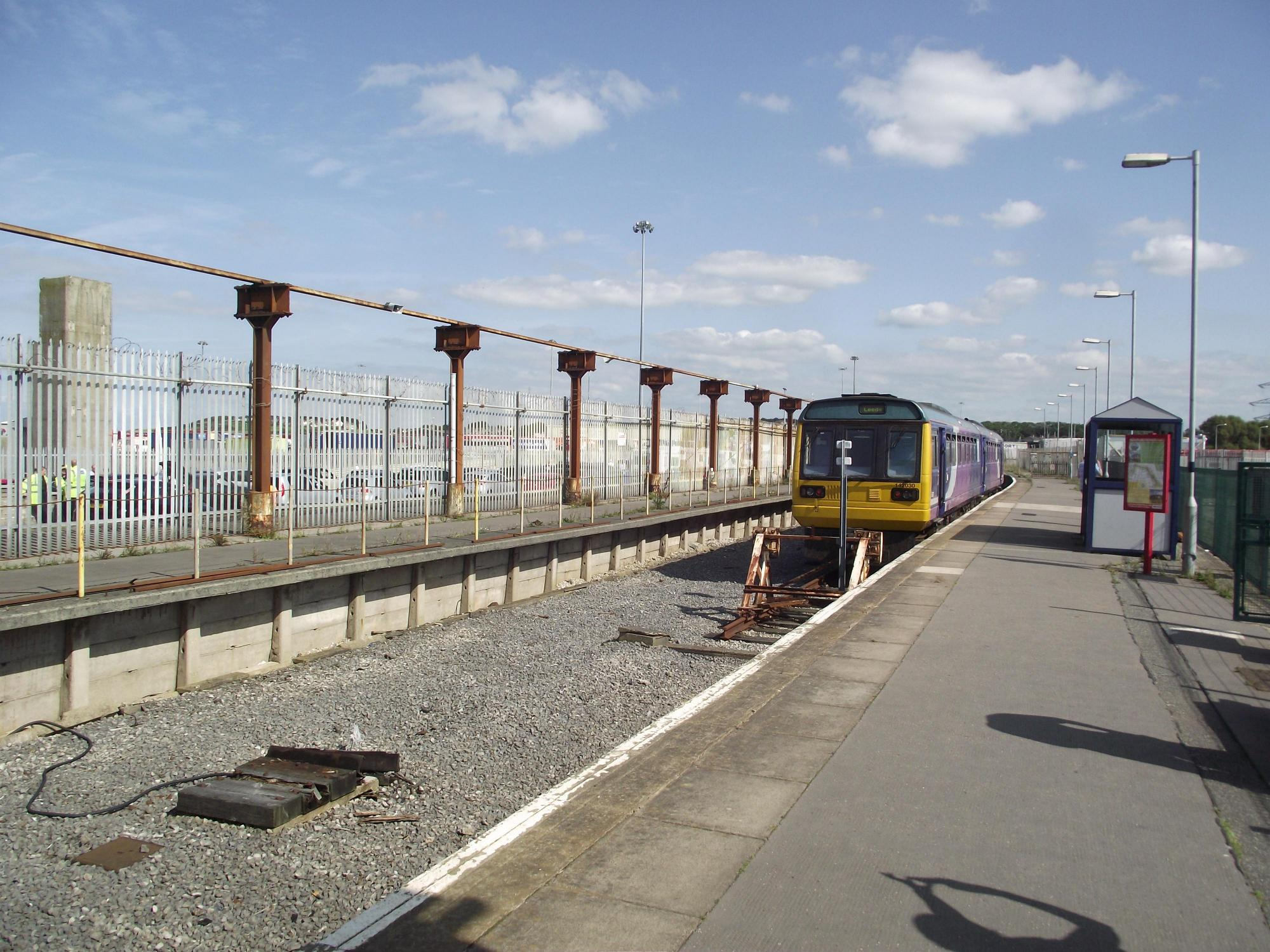

General information
- Location: Heysham Port, City of Lancaster; England
- Coordinates: 54°02′00″N 2°54′47″W
- Grid reference: SD402600
- Owner: Network Rail
- Manager: Northern Trains
- Platforms: 1
- Tracks: 1

Other information
- Station code: HHB
- Classification: DfT category F1

History
- Original company: Midland Railway
- Pre-grouping: Midland Railway
- Post-grouping: London, Midland and Scottish Railway; British Rail (London Midland Region)

Key dates
- 11 July 1904: Opened as Heysham Harbour
- 4 May 1970: Resited
- 6 October 1975: Closed
- 11 May 1987: Reopened and renamed Heysham Sea Terminal
- 28 September 1992: Renamed Heysham Port

Passengers
- 2021/22: ▲8,404
- 2022/23: ▲9,448
- 2023/24: ▲12,226
- 2024/25: ▲12,764
- 2025/26: ▲14,266
Location
- Location within the City of Lancaster district Location within Lancashire
Notes
- Passenger statistics from the Office of Rail and Road

Heysham Port is a railway station on the Morecambe branch line, which runs between Lancaster and Heysham Port. The station, situated 7 3/4 miles (12 km) west of Lancaster, serves Heysham Port in Lancashire. It is owned by Network Rail and managed by Northern Trains.

== History ==
=== Early years ===
The station was opened as Heysham Harbour by the Midland Railway on 11 July 1904. It was relocated to an adjacent site on 4 May 1970, and served boat trains for Belfast until the closure of the ferry route in April 1975. The train service was withdrawn on 6 October 1975, but reinstated, and the station renamed Heysham Sea Terminal on 11 May 1987, to provide a rail connection with the daily sailing to Douglas run by the Isle of Man Steam Packet Company. The station was renamed Heysham Port on 28 September 1992, under the Regional Railways sector of British Rail.

As constructed, the station had three platforms, two signal boxes and an extensive goods depot and associated sidings to service the port complex (which dates from 1904). It handled a range of freight for export including livestock, parcels and fuel oil from a distribution terminal operated by Shell. None of these types of traffic have been handled here since the early 1980s - all freight through the port, mainly containers, is worked by road.

A frequent passenger service was provided by the Midland Railway for its work force at the port and the regular ferry sailings to Scotland, the Isle of Man and Northern Ireland. Four years after opening, the MR used the line as a test track for a pioneering system of electrification, utilising a trio of purpose-built 3-car electric multiple units (EMUs) powered by an overhead catenary carrying alternating current at 6600 V, 25 Hz. Stock for the line was built at the company's Derby works and power was provided from their power plant at the harbour. Services ran to Morecambe on 13 April 1908 and by September extended to the LNWR main line station at Lancaster Castle.

With two reversals required en route and a relatively short journey between termini, the units were well suited for the busy route, which operated on a half-hourly frequency for much of the day. Long-distance express trains routed by way of the former "Little" North Western Railway main line from Leeds via Skipton also used the station. The most notable was a daily through train to/from London St Pancras via Sheffield connecting with the ferry to Belfast. After the 1923 Grouping, the station and port came under the control of the London, Midland and Scottish Railway. The company developed traffic but made alterations to the passenger services, replacing the St Pancras service with one from London Euston via Preston and the West Coast Main Line and added a second regular boat service to and from Manchester Victoria. Services ran to and from Leeds and through carriages were provided for St Pancras passengers in summer until the onset of World War II. The station was host to three LMS camping coaches in 1934, 12 in 1935 and 36 from 1936 to 1939.

=== Decline and withdrawal of passenger services ===
Nationalisation in January 1948 saw the London Midland Region of British Railways take over the running of the line. British Railways withdrew the old Midland EMUs in 1951 and, two years later, replaced them with three elderly ex-LNWR sets formerly used on the West London Line service between Earls Court and Willesden Junction (a fourth set was added in 1957). These trains were required because the line was used as a trial for 50 Hz industrial frequency electrification. The original 25 Hz power supply fed from rotary converters at the Heysham Port Station was replaced with a new grid connected supply at Green Ayre Station, Lancaster but the original 6.6 kV. The units remained in use until after the Beeching Report in 1963, which recommended that services over the former NWR/Midland route from Lancaster be withdrawn and the line closed. Services to Morecambe would be retained, but only in connection with sailings to Douglas and Belfast and were to be diesel-worked.

The proposals were approved in August 1965, and the local service was withdrawn on 3 January 1966. The overheads were dismantled the following year, after the Midland line was closed to all traffic between Morecambe, Lancaster and Wennington. Freight traffic continued although from June 1967, it operated via Morecambe, where all trains had to reverse.

A further change to traffic patterns came about in 1968, when ferry operator Sealink announced its intention to convert the two ships operating out of the port on the Belfast route to "roll-on/roll-off" car ferries rather than conventional passenger ships. The change required major alterations to the ferries and to the berths at both termini. At Heysham, the station building was demolished and its replacement built on an adjacent site. The station reopened for traffic on 4 May 1970. As part of the scheme, a new signal box and associated signalling was provided. The viability of the Belfast route was compromised by the Northern Irish Troubles in the years that followed. Mounting losses led to its withdrawal on 5 April 1975 and led the connecting rail services becoming redundant and to the closure of the station to passengers, a few months later, in October 1975.

Freight traffic continued but was only a fraction of what had been handled previously and BR rationalised the station layout, mothballing the signal box, removing the signalling and disconnecting one of the two approach lines from Heysham Moss in 1977. The remaining line was operated under "One Train Working" regulations, with the box acting as a ground frame for controlling the points to the sidings. The disused station had two platform lines accessible for use by railtours and special trains. By 1983, oil trains had ceased and the terminal sidings were then lifted.

=== Modern era ===
Passenger trains resumed in 1987, and in 1994, the layout was rationalised again as part of the programme of works associated with the building of the current Morecambe station. The last portion of double track on the branch from Holt Bank Junction to the former ICI sidings at Heysham Moss was singled, redundant trackwork was removed, and the old signal box dismantled (it was subsequently donated to the heritage Dean Forest Railway and has been restored and rebuilt at Lydney Junction). After the work was completed, all that remained was the single line from Morecambe running into the one active platform and a private siding connection laid in the early 1970s into Heysham power station. Much of the land occupied by the old goods yard and disused platforms is used by the Port of Heysham's owners, Peel Ports as secure parking for HGVs waiting for ferries.

The branch handles occasional freight trains operated by Direct Rail Services from the reprocessing plant at Sellafield to Heysham nuclear power station. They usually run once or twice-weekly and use the siding that diverges from the main running line a short distance east of the station. Access is by means of a ground frame unlocked and operated by the train crew and the trains are usually worked with a locomotive at each end, to avoid the need for run-round moves when the train reverses at Morecambe, and for security reasons.

== Facilities ==
The facilities at the station are basic: it is unstaffed and a single waiting shelter is provided but there is a customer information screen and PA. All tickets must be purchased in advance or on board the train. There is step-free access from the ferry terminal and car park to the platform.

Although the station is publicly accessible, it can be reached only by travelling along the busy main road into the port complex (either by car or on foot) from Heysham village, which is more than 1 mile (2 km) away. Most passengers using the station do so only to connect with the daily ferry sailings as there is little local commuter or residential traffic.

== Services ==
A twice-daily service formerly served the railway station (the first around midday with a second approximately an hour later), which connected with the Isle of Man Steam Packet Company's ferry service to Douglas on the Isle of Man. The services were operated by Northern as an extension of the Lancaster-Morecambe shuttle, but in the late 1980s and early 1990s, one train ran through to/from Manchester Victoria via Preston. A Sunday service ran during the summer months. From December 2008, the service was reduced to one train each way per day, which ran to and from Leeds. A Sunday service (of two trains each way) operated in the summer months (mid-May until mid-September).

From the summer 2018 timetable change the service has been altered again, now running to and from Lancaster only. The Sunday service has been reduced to a single train each way, but runs throughout the year and has a connection at Lancaster for Carnforth and stations to Leeds.

== Sources ==
- Butt, R. V. J. (October 1995). The Directory of Railway Stations: details every public and private passenger station, halt, platform and stopping place, past and present (1st ed.). Sparkford: Patrick Stephens Ltd. ISBN 978-1-85260-508-7. OCLC 60251199. OL 11956311M.
- Marshall, J (1981). Forgotten Railways North-West England. Newton Abbott: David & Charles. ISBN 0-7153-8003-6.
- McRae, Andrew (1997). British Railway Camping Coach Holidays: The 1930s & British Railways (London Midland Region). Vol. Scenes from the Past: 30 (Part One). Foxline. ISBN 1-870119-48-7.

Preceding station	National Rail	Following station
Morecambe	Northern Trains; Heysham Port - Lancaster	Terminus
	Ferry services	
Terminus	Isle of Man Steam Packet Company	Douglas
	Historical railways	
Middleton Road Bridge Halt	Midland Railway "Little" North Western Railway	Terminus
