= Lancaster railway station =

Railway station in Lancashire, England

Lancaster
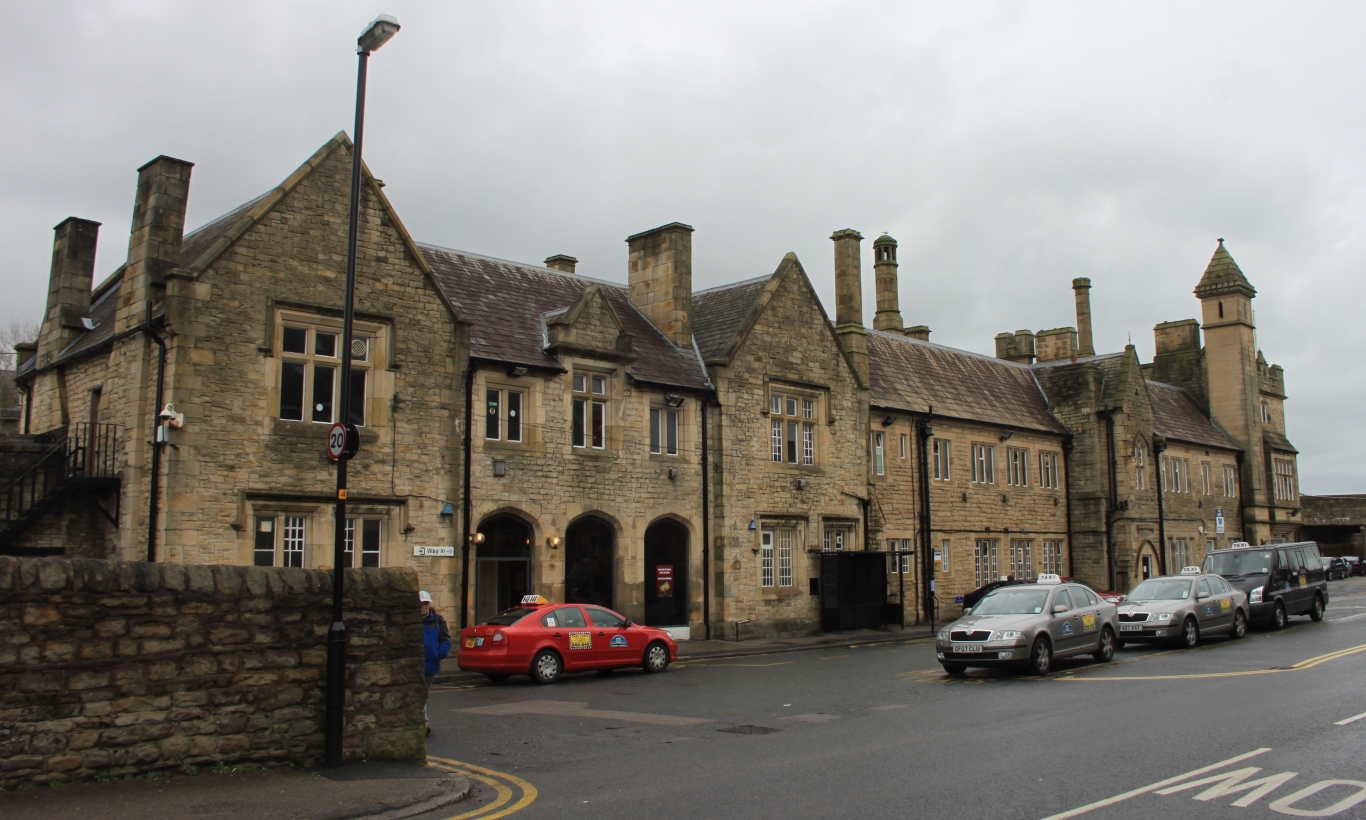

General information
- Location: Lancaster, City of Lancaster; England
- Coordinates: 54°02′56″N 02°48′26″W
- Grid reference: SD472617
- Manager: Avanti West Coast
- Platforms: 5

Other information
- Station code: LAN
- Classification: DfT category B

History
- Original company: Lancaster and Carlisle Railway
- Pre-grouping: London and North Western Railway
- Post-grouping: London, Midland and Scottish Railway

Key dates
- 22 September 1846: Opened as Lancaster Castle
- 1902: Remodelled
- 5 May 1969: Renamed Lancaster

Passengers
- 2021/22: ▲1.659 million
- Interchange: ▲0.261 million
- 2022/23: ▲1.830 million
- Interchange: ▲0.382 million
- 2023/24: ▲1.964 million
- Interchange: ▲0.455 million
- 2024/25: ▲2.184 million
- Interchange: ▼0.450 million
- 2025/26: ▲2.365 million
- Interchange: ▲0.465 million
Location
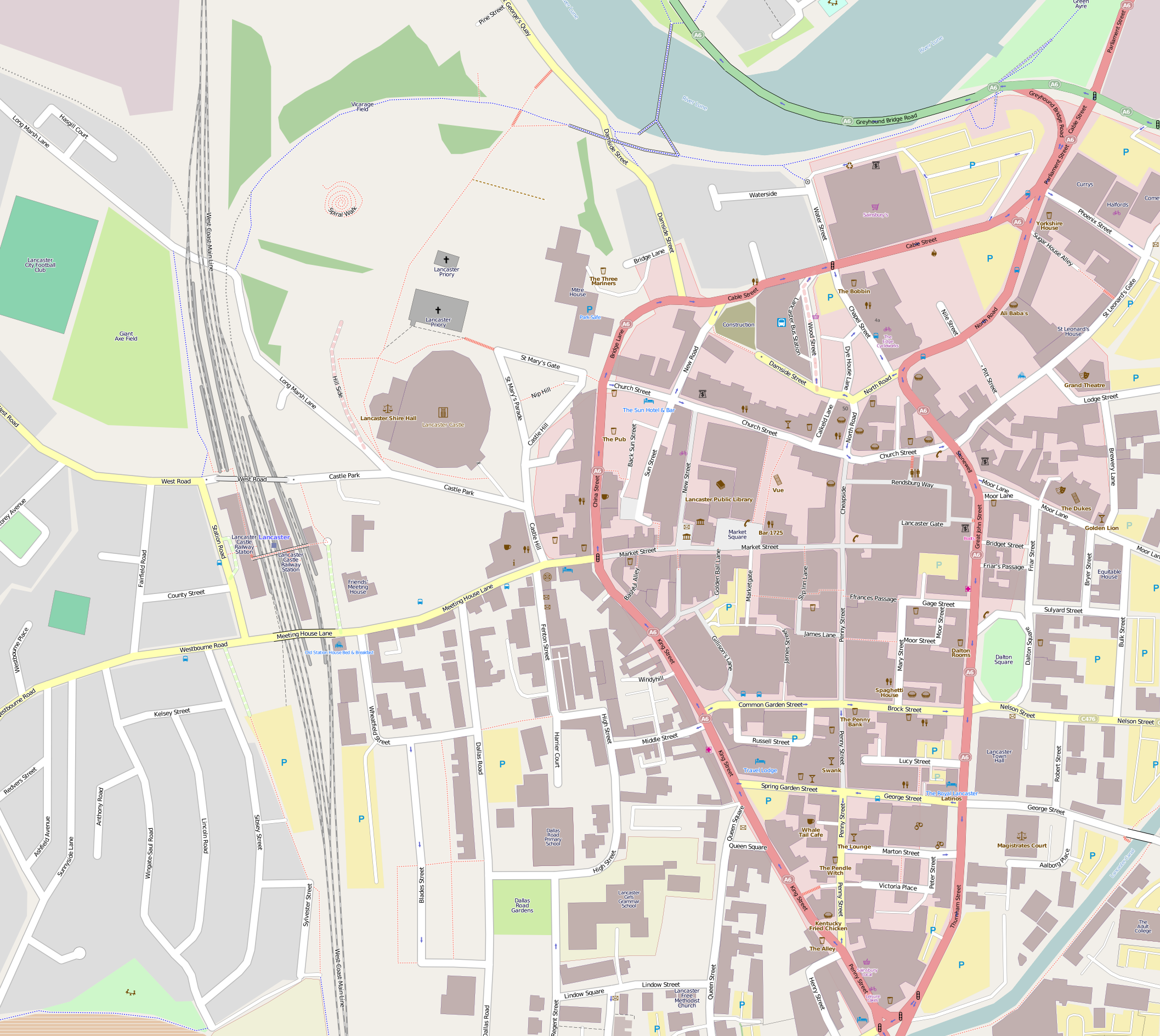
- Location within Lancaster city centre
Notes
- Passenger statistics from the Office of Rail and Road

Lancaster railway station (formerly Lancaster Castle) serves the city of Lancaster, in Lancashire, England. It is one of the principal stations on the West Coast Main Line, located 20 miles 78 chains (33.76 km) north of Preston.

== History ==
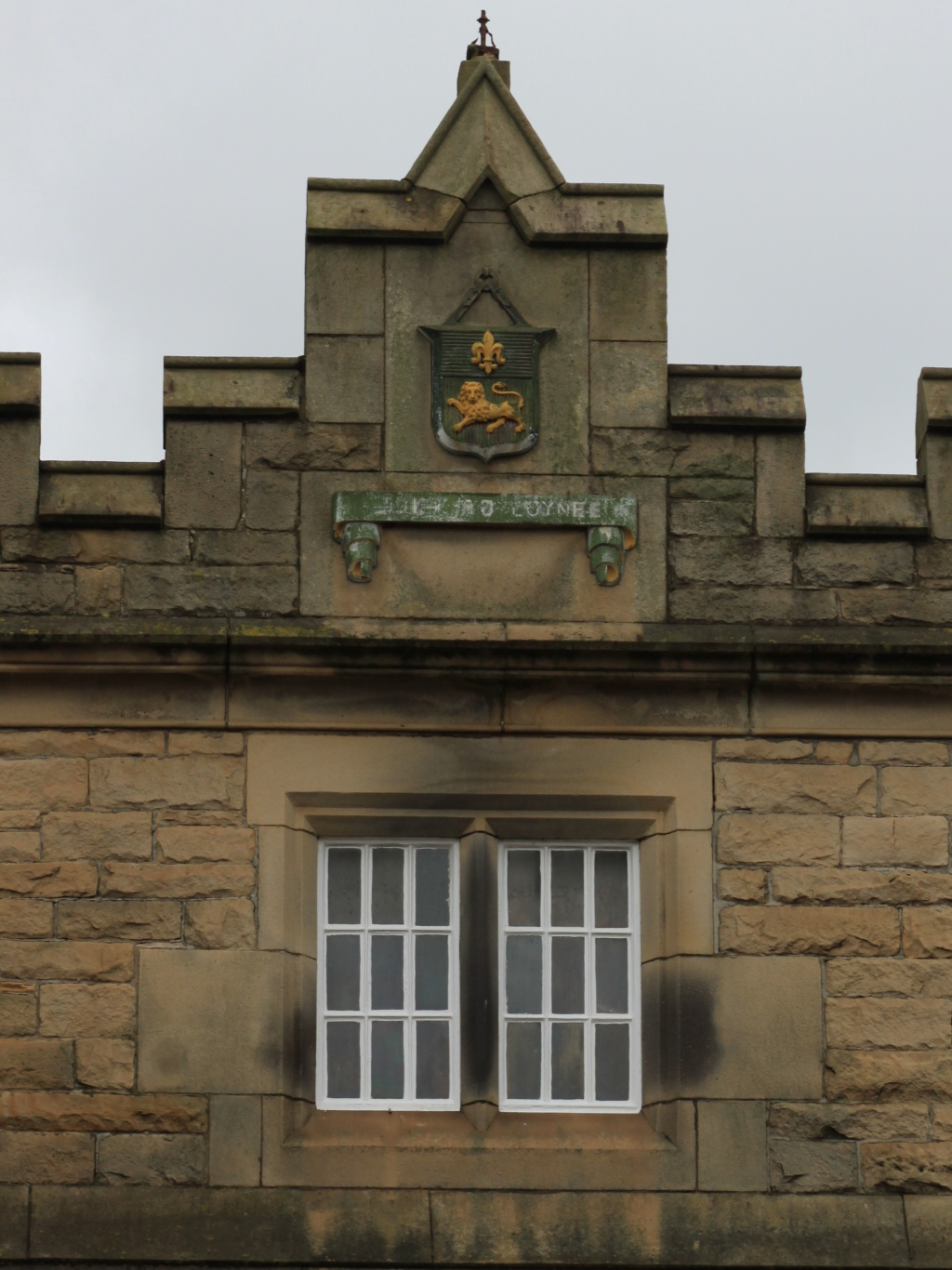
The 1852 extension includes a relief carving of the coat of arms of Lancaster

Originally known as Lancaster Castle, in order to distinguish it from the Lancaster Greaves station (1840–1849), Lancaster station was officially opened on 21 September 1846. The first public service ran into the station on 17 December the same year. It was built as the southern terminus of the Lancaster and Carlisle Railway after the initial planned route for the line was changed in favour of a cheaper route west of the city; it would have followed the Lancaster Canal and crossed the River Lune from Ladies Walk to Skerton.

The station was remodelled in 1900-1906 when additional lines and platforms were added and further station buildings constructed. The new buildings were styled mock-Elizabethan with the intention of mirroring the battlements of the nearby Lancaster Castle. Platforms 5 and 6 (on the east side of the station) were electrified in 1908 to serve the now-closed "Little" North Western Railway route to Morecambe and Heysham. This line closed in January 1966 and the overhead line equipment was removed.

The track layout in the station area was rationalised in 1973, when control of the signalling was transferred to the new Preston power signal box. This included the removal of the track from platform 6, although this platform had seen no regular use for some time prior to this. The West Coast Main Line through Lancaster was electrified in 1974 and regular electric passenger services commenced here on 7 May 1974.

In 2023, upgrades to the platforms canopies were announced as part of a £9.5 million investment into the station, with work continuing into 2025.

== Description ==
The main building, constructed in 1846 by William Tite, was situated on the west side of the line in Tudor Revival style using roughly squared sandstone rubble. This two-storey building was extended southwards in 1852 in similar style, although this section terminated in a tower of three storeys. A new entrance was constructed in 1900 on the eastern side of the line at footbridge level; this is nearer the town and houses the remaining ticket office.

=== Facilities ===
The booking office is open throughout the week, closing only in the late evening; ticket machines are also available. A full range of station facilities are offered, including a newsagents, a buffet, waiting rooms and toilets, with lifts between the footbridge and platforms to enable full accessibility for disabled passengers.

== Platform layout ==
- Platforms 1 and 2 are bay platforms which are used by terminating trains from the branch lines to Heysham Port and the Furness Line to Barrow-in-Furness, which continues to the Cumbria Coast Line to Carlisle.
- Platform 3 is used mostly by northbound services on the West Coast Main Line, and includes the main entrance through the original station building.
- Between platforms 3 and 4, there are two through lines. They are used by non-stop passenger services and freight trains in both directions.
- Platform 4 is an island platform with a second face, used principally for southbound trains on the West Coast Main Line.
- Platform 5 is used by northbound and southbound trains and for terminating services.

== Services ==
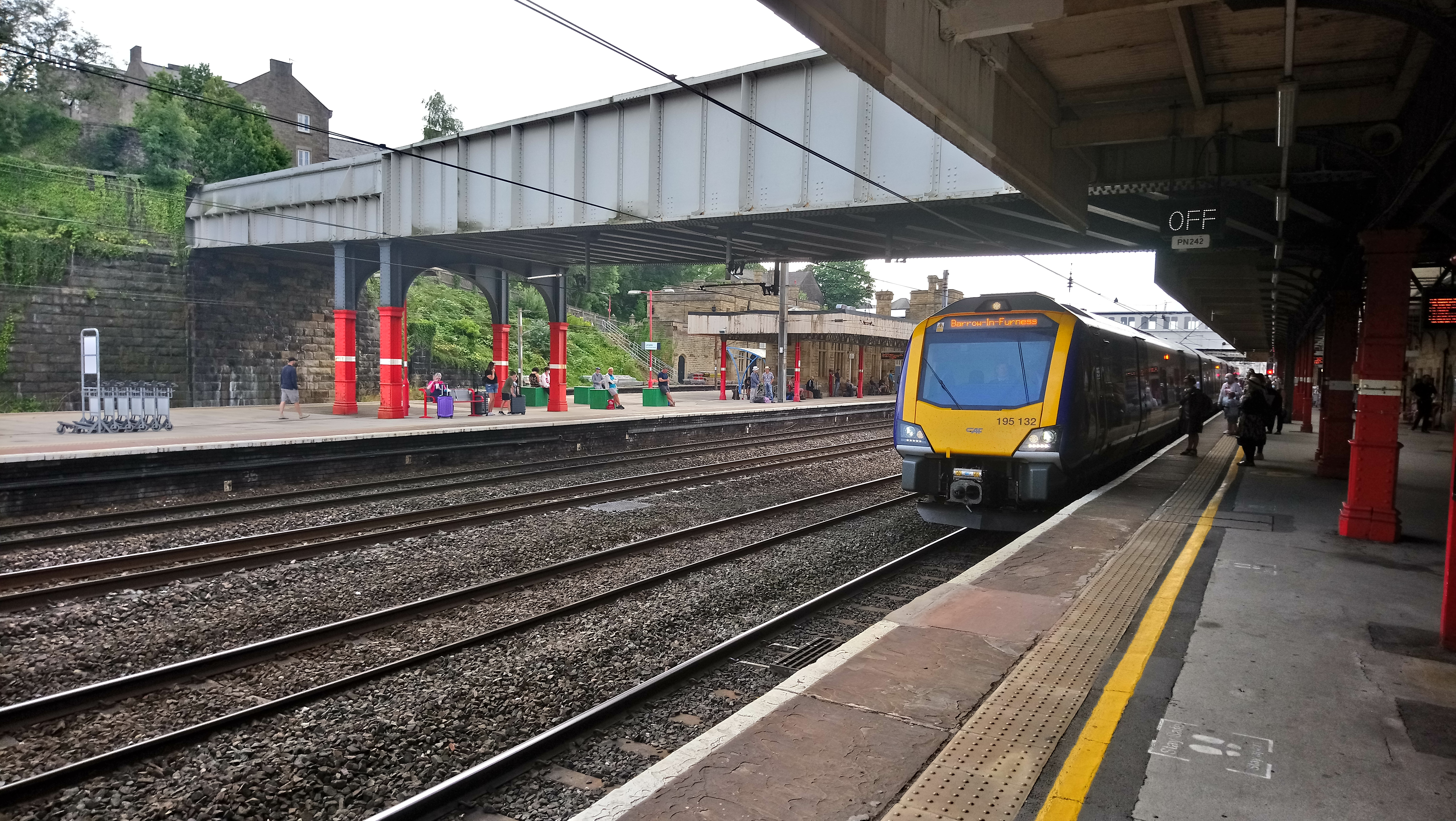
A Northern Class 195 train on a service to Barrow-in-Furness stops beneath the station's West Road bridge, July 2021

Lancaster is served by three train operating companies:

- Avanti West Coast operates express trains from London Euston to Edinburgh Waverley and to Glasgow Central, using Class 390 Pendolinos. Peak services to and from London Euston terminate and start at Lancaster or Carlisle. A few services to/from Crewe also start/terminate at Lancaster.
- TransPennine Express operates regional express services from Manchester Airport, Liverpool Lime Street and Preston to Edinburgh Waverley and Glasgow Central, via the West Coast Main Line, using Class 397 EMUs and Class 802 EMUs.
- Northern Trains operates local and regional services along the following lines, using diesel multiple units (DMUs) of Classes 150, 153, 156, 158 and 195s:
  - Furness line to Barrow-in-Furness and then on to Carlisle via the Cumbrian Coast Line
  - Windermere branch line to Windermere, via the West Coast Main Line to Oxenholme Lake District
  - Morecambe branch line to Morecambe and Heysham Port; nuclear flask trains serving Heysham power station are the other main users of this line
  - Leeds–Morecambe line to Skipton and Leeds.

Preceding station	National Rail	Following station
Penrith North Lakes	Avanti West Coast West Coast Main Line	Preston
Oxenholme Lake District	Avanti West Coast West Coast Main Line	Preston
Penrith North Lakes	TransPennine Express TransPennine North West; Edinburgh Waverley / Glasgow Central - Manchester Airport	Preston
Oxenholme Lake District	TransPennine Express TransPennine North West; Edinburgh Waverley / Glasgow Central - Manchester Airport	Preston
Carlisle	TransPennine Express TransPennine North West; Glasgow Central - Liverpool Lime Street	Preston
Penrith North Lakes	TransPennine Express TransPennine North West; Glasgow Central - Liverpool Lime Street	Preston
Oxenholme Lake District	TransPennine Express TransPennine North West; Glasgow Central - Liverpool Lime Street	Preston
Carnforth	Northern Trains Furness Line / Barrow-in-Furness	Terminus
Carnforth	Northern Trains Leeds to Morecambe Line	Bare Lane
Terminus	Northern Trains Morecambe Branch Line	Bare Lane
Carnforth	Northern Trains; Barrow-in-Furness - Manchester Airport	Preston
Oxenholme Lake District	Northern Trains; Windermere - Manchester Airport	Preston
	Historical railways	
Hest Bank	Furness Railway	Terminus
Hest Bank	London and North Western Railway; Lancaster and Carlisle Railway	Galgate
	Disused railways	
Lancaster Green Ayre	Midland Railway "Little" North Western Railway	Terminus
Ashton Hall	London and North Western Railway; Glasson Dock branch line	Terminus

== See also ==
- Listed buildings in Lancaster, Lancashire
