= Listed buildings in Grayrigg =

Grayrigg is a civil parish in Westmorland and Furness, Cumbria, England. It contains eleven listed buildings that are recorded in the National Heritage List for England. Of these, one is listed at Grade II*, the middle of the three grades, and the others are at Grade II, the lowest grade. The parish is almost entirely rural, the only significant settlement being the village of Grayrigg. The listed buildings include houses, farmhouses, farm buildings, bridges, milestones, a church, and a disused railway viaduct.

== Key ==
Grade	Criteria
II*	Particularly important buildings of more than special interest
II	Buildings of national importance and special interest

== Buildings ==
Name and location	Photograph	Date	Notes	Grade
Crook of Lune Bridge; 54.36090°N 2.58578°W		16th century or earlier	The bridge carries a road over the River Lune. It is in stone, and consists of two asymmetrical segmental arches. The central pier has cutwaters, and rises to form triangular buttresses. The bridge has thin voussoirs, stone-slate bands, a narrow humped deck about 2 metres (6 ft 7 in) wide, parapets, and splayed abutments.	II*
Barn, Grayrigg Hall; 54.37178°N 2.64905°W	—	17th century or earlier	A cruck-framed barn in stone with a slate roof. It has an L-shaped plan, doorways and windows, and an outshut at the right end of the southeast range.	II
Grayrigg Foot with outbuilding 54.36300°N 2.66382°W	—	Mid- to late 17th century	The house and outbuilding are in stone, the house is roughcast and has a slate roof, and the outbuilding has a roof of corrugated iron. They form an L-shaped plan, and have two storeys and a front of six bays. The buildings have varied windows, and on the west end are lean-to pigsties.	II
Grayrigg Hall; 54.37144°N 2.64884°W		Early to mid-18th century	A stone farmhouse, partly roughcast, with a slate roof. There are two storeys with an attic, a main block of three bays, a recessed lower extension to the right with a porch in the angle, and rear outshuts. In the middle of the main block is a gabled timber porch, and the windows are casements.	II
Ivy Bridge; 54.36343°N 2.67592°W	—	Late 18th or early 19th century	The bridge carries a track over the River Mint. It is in stone and consists of a segmental arch with two flood arches to the north. The bridge has a canted cutwater to the north, a plain parapet, and flanking piers.	II
Pool House and outbuilding 54.36134°N 2.58739°W	—	Late 18th or early 19th century	A stone house with a slate roof, two storeys, three bays, and an outbuilding to the left. The entrance to the house has a gabled porch, and above the entrance to the outbuilding is a lean-to canopy. The windows are casements, and at the rear is an outshut.	II
Grayrigg Head; 54.36471°N 2.62184°W	—	Early 19th century	A roughcast stone house with a hipped slate roof. There are two storeys, and a symmetrical front of three bays. At the rear is a two-storey gabled stair wing and a two-storey two-bay wing, both with quoins. In the centre of the front is a Tuscan porch with a frieze, a cornice and a blocking course. The windows are sashes.	II
Milestone at SD 616 974; 54.37120°N 2.59167°W	—	Early 19th century	The milepost stands on the route of the Sedbergh to Grayrigg turnpike road, now the B6257 road. It is in stone and has a semicircular plan, set on a square base with broaches. It is inscribed with initials and numbers indicating the distances to Borrow Bridge and to Kirkby Lonsdale. On the top is a benchmark.	II
Milestone approximately 40 metres from A685; 54.38387°N 2.59656°W	—	Early 19th century	The milepost stands on the route of the Sedbergh to Grayrigg turnpike road, now the B6257 road. It is in stone and has a semicircular plan, set on a square base with broaches. It is inscribed with initials and numbers indicating the distances to Borrow Bridge and to Kirkby Lonsdale.	II
St John's Church; 54.36834°N 2.65006°W		1837–38	The church was designed by George Webster, and the tower was rebuilt in 1869. It is in stone, partly roughcast, and has a slate roof with coped gables and fleuron finials. The church consists of a nave with a south porch, an apsidal east end, and a west tower. The tower has diagonal buttresses, gargoyles, and a stepped embattled parapet. The windows are lancets.	II
Lowgill Viaduct; 54.36200°N 2.59146°W		1859	The viaduct was built by the London and North Western Railway to carry the Ingleton Branch over a tributary of the River Lune, and was designed by Joseph Locke and John Errington. It is in sandstone, and consists of eleven round arches carried on piers with impost bands and cornices. The end piers have dentilled cornices and caps with triangular heads.	II

== See also ==
- Listed buildings in Whinfell
- Listed buildings in Tebay
- Listed buildings in Sedbergh
- Listed buildings in Firbank
- Listed buildings in Lambrigg
- Listed buildings in Docker
