= Listed buildings in Firbank =

Firbank is a civil parish in Westmorland and Furness, Cumbria, England. It contains 15 listed buildings that are recorded in the National Heritage List for England. Of these, one is listed at Grade II*, the middle of the three grades, and the others are at Grade II, the lowest grade. The parish is almost completely rural, with no settlements of significant size. The listed buildings consist of farmhouses, farm buildings, houses, bridges, mileposts, a burial ground, and a church.

== Key ==
Grade	Criteria
II*	Particularly important buildings of more than special interest
II	Buildings of national importance and special interest

== Buildings ==
Name and location	Photograph	Date	Notes	Grade
Graveyard boundary walls 54.33781°N 2.58753°W		Before mid 17th century	The walls surround the churchyard of the former parish church which was demolished in the 1830s. They are in drystone and have an entrance on the west side. To the southeast of the walls is the site where George Fox preached in 1652, known as Fox's pulpit.	II
Lincoln's Inn Bridge; 54.32468°N 2.56767°W		17th century (probable)	The bridge carries the A684 road over the River Lune. It is in stone, and consists of two segmental arches of unequal span with voussoirs. The pier has triangular cutwaters rising to form triangular buttresses.	II
Packhorse bridge 54.36211°N 2.59185°W		17th or 18th century (probable)	The packhorse bridge crosses a stream. It is in stone, and consists of a slightly flattened segmental arch. The bridge has thin voussoirs and low abutments, but no parapets.	II
Bridge End and barn 54.32491°N 2.56864°W	—	Early 18th century (probable)	The farmhouse and the barn, which dates from the later 18th century, are in stone with slate roofs. The house has two storeys, two bays, an outshut at the right, a gabled porch with a segmental arch, and sash windows. The barn to the left is higher, with quoins, round-headed openings, a doorway, a winnowing door, a loading doorway, and square ventilation holes.	II
Hawkrigg and outbuildings 54.32220°N 2.57872°W	—	Early 18th century (probable)	The farmhouse and flanking outbuildings are in stone, the house is rendered, and they have a slate roof. The house has two storeys, two bays, a central gabled porch with a segmental-headed entrance, and sash windows. The outbuildings contain doorways, a window, and pitching holes.	II
High House Farmhouse; 54.35768°N 2.59711°W	—	1727	The farmhouse is in stone with a slate roof, and has two storeys, four bays, and two outshuts at the rear. The second bay has a projecting two-storey porch with a segmental arch, and the fourth bay is recessed. The windows vary; some are casements, one is mullioned, and there is a fire window.	II
Cottage north of Moors Farmhouse; 54.35154°N 2.58752°W	—	1744	A stone house with a slate roof, two storeys, three bays, and an outbuilding to the left. On the front is a gabled porch with a datestone above, and the windows are mixed, mainly casements. At the rear is a lean-to porch, and the outbuilding has an outshut.	II
Underknotts; 54.33806°N 2.57535°W	—	1749	A stone house with a slate roof, two storeys with an attic, and five bays. On the front is a gabled porch with a datestone, and the windows are casements. At the rear is a low projection, and a stair window.	II
Barn, Underknotts; 54.33814°N 2.57507°W	—	18th century (probable)	The barn is in stone with a slate roof. It contains a barn entrance, doorways, pigeon holes with sills in a lozenge patterns, windows, ventilation slits, and a winnowing door.	II
Milepost approximately 100 metres to west of Bridge End; 54.32445°N 2.57049°W	—	Early 19th century (probable)	The milepost stands on the route of the Sedbergh to Kendal turnpike road, now the A684 road. It is in stone and has a semicircular plan, set on a square base with broaches. It is inscribed with initials and numbers indicating the distances to Sedbergh and to Kendal.	II
Milestone at SD 628 933; 54.33452°N 2.57222°W		Early 19th century (probable)	The milestone stands on the route of the Sedbergh to Grayrigg turnpike road, now the B6257 road. It is in stone and has a semicircular plan, set on a square base with broaches. It is inscribed with initials and numbers indicating the distances to Borrow Bridge and to Kirkby Lonsdale.	II
Milestone at SD 624 947; 54.34744°N 2.57951°W		Early 19th century (probable)	The milestone stands on the route of the Sedbergh to Grayrigg turnpike road, now the B6257 road. It is in stone and has a semicircular plan, set on a square base with broaches. It is inscribed with initials and numbers indicating the distances to Borrow Bridge and to Kirkby Lonsdale.	II
Milestone at SD 617 961; 54.35908°N 2.59079°W		Early 19th century (probable)	The milestone stands on the route of the Sedbergh to Grayrigg turnpike road, now the B6257 road. It is in stone and has a semicircular plan, set on a square base with broaches. It is inscribed with initials and numbers indicating the distances to Borrow Bridge and to Kirkby Lonsdale.	II
St John's Church; 54.33637°N 2.57369°W		1842	The church is in stone with a top cornice, and a slate roof with coped gables and finials at the east end. It consists of a nave and a chancel with an apse. At the west end is a bell turret with a string course and a projecting embattled parapet. The windows are lancets, and in the apse are three stepped lancets. The entrance at the west end has a pointed arch, and above it is a datestone.	II
Lune Viaduct; 54.33168°N 2.56951°W		1857–61	The viaduct was built by the London and North Western Railway to carry the Ingleton Branch over the River Lune at a height of 31 metres (102 ft), and was designed by Joseph Locke and John Errington. It has a symmetrical design, with a central segmental cast iron arch flanked by three round-headed sandstone arches, and has a total length of 163 metres (535 ft). The central span is 38 metres (125 ft) long, and has spandrels filled with two tiers of round-headed arches.	II*
