= Lambrigg Fell =

339m high hill in England

Coordinates: 54.34076°N 2.63828°W

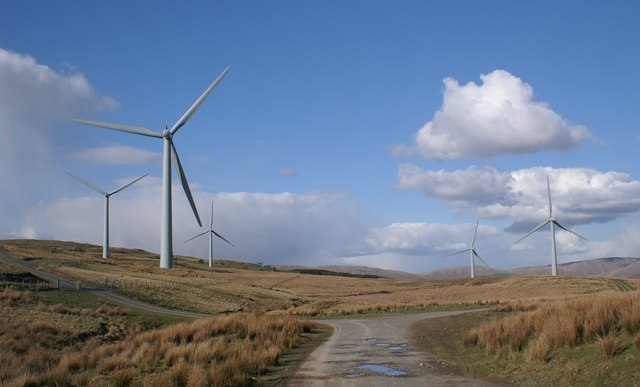
- The Lambrigg wind farm, looking north

Highest point
- Elevation: 339 m (1,112 ft)
- Prominence: c. 152 m
- Parent peak: Grayrigg Forest
- Listing: Marilyn

Geography
- OS grid: SD586941
- Topo map: OS Landranger 97

Lambrigg Fell is a hill, the highest point of the area of high ground between Kendal and the M6, in south-eastern Cumbria, England.

It lies just outside the area normally defined as the Lake District, and the hill is not in the same mould as the nearby Lakeland Fells, being a sprawling, grassy moorland. For this reason, it is not nearly as popular as its subsidiary top to the west, Benson Knott, which overlooks Kendal. However, the hill provides close-range views of both the Howgill Fells and the Lake District, together with the Yorkshire Dales.

The hill can be accessed by the minor road linking Docker and Lambrigg Head, which runs across the northern slopes of the fell. However, car parking is very limited near to the access gate. A track runs most of the way towards the summit, passing a small reservoir. The landowner is strongly opposed to use of this track from the top sheepfold onwards and the right of way follows a due south route over boggy ground from the top sheepfold. This gives a walk of about two and a half miles. Note that the right of way does not reach the summit and the landowner has acted to prevent those making the 200metre diversion to get to the top.

Some 100 metres west of the summit, on the eastern side of the bridleway, the ruins of a small building may be seen. The exact nature of this structure is unclear, but local residents state that it was used as a shelter for members of shooting parties on the fell. It is possible to continue in a southerly direction along the bridleway and complete the walk by joining the A684, Sedbergh Road. There is a large wind farm owned by Innogy just to the east of the summit. The wind farm, which can generate 6.5 Megawatts of electricity, was opened in September 2000 and at that time it was the largest wind farm to be built in England since 1993. The land on which the wind farm is built is out of bounds to unauthorized personnel.

The block of land of which Lambrigg Fell is the summit — thus making it a Marilyn — lies in the extreme south-east of Lakeland, between the River Kent and the River Lune. It also contains the Marilyns of Hutton Roof Crags and Arnside Knott, and the summits of Benson Knott, Scout Hill, Warton Crag and Oaken Head.
