= Listed buildings in Kirkby Lonsdale =

Kirkby Lonsdale is a civil parish in the Westmorland and Furness district of Cumbria, England. It contains 163 listed buildings that are recorded in the National Heritage List for England. Of these, two are listed at Grade I, the highest of the three grades, four are at Grade II*, the middle grade, and the others are at Grade II, the lowest grade. The parish contains the town of Kirkby Lonsdale and the surrounding countryside. A high proportion of the listed buildings are near the centre of the town, and are mainly houses and associated structures, shops, business premises, public houses, and churches and associated structures. The other listed buildings include farmhouses and farm buildings, bridges, two market crosses, and milestones.

== Key ==
Grade	Criteria
I	Buildings of exceptional interest, sometimes considered to be internationally important
II*	Particularly important buildings of more than special interest
II	Buildings of national importance and special interest

== Buildings ==
Name and location	Photograph	Date	Notes	Grade
St Mary's Church; 54.20365°N 2.59753°W		12th century	The church was altered and extended during the centuries, It was undated in the 16th century, the north aisle was added in 1574, in 1807 Francis Webster rebuilt the roof, and in 1866–68 E. G. Paley carried out a restoration and added the porch. The church is built in stone with a slate roof, and consists of a nave, two north aisles, a south aisle with a porch, a chancel, and an embraced west tower. The four-stage tower and the walls are embattled. Three doorways and the north aisle arcade are Norman; the outer north arcade is Perpendicular.	I
Market Cross, Mill Brow; 54.20327°N 2.59663°W		Medieval	The market cross was moved from Market Street to its present site in 1819. It consists of a round shaft with a square base on three octagonal steps. At the top is an octagonal capital to which a ball finial was added in the 19th century.	II
High Biggins Old Hall; 54.19833°N 2.61260°W	—	15th century	Wings were added in the early 17th and in the 19th century, resulting in an L-shaped plan. The hall is in stone with quoins, a slate roof, and two storeys. There are windows of varying types, some of which are mullioned with hood moulds, and there is a surviving crocketed finial.	II*
Devil's Bridge; 54.19840°N 2.59067°W		15th to early 16th century	The bridge carries a road, Bridge Brow, over the River Lune. It is in stone, and consists of three segmental arches, the east arch being smaller. The bridge has chamfered arches, piers with triangular cutwaters on both sides, and the piers rise to canted refuges. There are canted abutments, string courses, and coped parapets. The roadway is about 4 metres (13 ft) wide. On the south parapet is an inscription, and at the east end is a sundial. The bridge is also a Scheduled Monument.	I
5, 7 (King's Arms public house) and 9 Market Street; 54.20306°N 2.59790°W		16th or early 17th century	Originally a manor house, it was refaced in the 18th century, and later became three properties, with a public house in the centre. The building is in stone, Nos. 5 and 7 are plastered, there are quoins on the left, and the roof is slated. There are three storeys and four bays, with an extension over an entry on the right. Each bay has a gable, that of the third bay being smaller, and the others containing Diocletian windows; the windows in the middle floor are sashes. In the ground floor of No. 5 is a doorway and a shop window. The public house occupies the middle bays, and has a doorway with Doric pilasters and an entablature; the windows are sashes, and at the left is an entry. In the ground floor of No. 9 is a shop front.	II
Deans Biggin Farmhouse; 54.22274°N 2.61192°W	—	16th or early 17th century	The farmhouse is in stone with a slate roof, two storeys, and a symmetrical three-bay front. On the front is a two-storey gabled porch with four-gabled finial. In the upper floor is a crude Venetian window with a keystone and a solid tympanum. The doorway has a segmental head, above which is a shield-shaped initialled and dated plaque. The porch is flanked by mullioned windows, and all the windows are casements.	II
1 and 3 Low Biggins; 54.19852°N 2.60621°W	—	17th century	A pair of stone houses, partly plastered, with a slate roof and two storeys. The windows were originally mullioned, but the mullions have been lost, and other alterations have been made.	II
54 and 56 Main Street; 54.20262°N 2.59717°W	—	17th century	A pebbledashed stone shop with a slate roof, a gabled rear wing, and two storeys. In the ground floor is a yard entry, and to the right are modern doors and windows. In the upper floor are casement windows and a blocked mullioned window. The rear wing contains a mullioned and transomed window.	II
Abbot Hall; 54.20235°N 2.60091°W	—	17th century	A pebbledashed house with a slate roof and two storeys. To the right is a two-storey gabled porch with a round-headed doorway. The windows have chamfered mullions, and some have hood moulds. There is another doorway to the left with a plain surround.	II
Scar Brow; 54.22473°N 2.60512°W	—	17th century	A stone house on a plinth, with quoins and a slate roof. There are two storeys, four bays, and a rear outshut. The windows in the front are sashes, and in the outshut is a mullioned window.	II
Sun Inn; 54.20318°N 2.59775°W		17th century	The inn incorporates an 18th-century block at the rear. It is in stone with a slate roof, and has two storeys at the front and three at the rear. The front is gabled, the upper floor is jettied over the street and is carried on three monolithic columns. The doorway has a wooden architrave, and the windows are sashes, those on the ground floor with architraves.	II
Summer house, Green Close; 54.20002°N 2.59630°W	—	1668	The summer house was originally mainly the front wall of a church porch, and was moved to its present site in 1866. It is in ashlar stone with a slate roof, and consists of a moulded segmental arch with a keystone, moulded jambs and an impost band. At the top is a gable with kneelers.	II
Tearnside Hall, stable and barn 54.20866°N 2.63285°W	—	1688	A farmhouse, stable and barn in one range, built in stone and with a slate roof. The farmhouse has quoins, two storeys with an attic, string courses forming hood moulds, and mullioned windows. On the front is a gabled two-storey porch containing a doorway with moulded jambs and a carved lintel. Above this is a decorated plaque containing initials and the date, and in the upper floor is a modified Venetian window. To the right is another doorway with an ogee head. At the rear are two outshuts.	II*
Old Manor House; 54.20353°N 2.59562°W	—	c.1700	The house is in rubble stone with ashlar dressings, chamfered rusticated quoins, and a slate roof. It has two storeys and a symmetrical five-bay front. The windows are cross-mullioned, and contain casements. The central doorway has a shouldered architrave, a triple keystone, and a broken segmental pediment, above which is an empty recess.	II
40, 42A, 42B and 44 Main Street; 54.20238°N 2.59714°W	—	17th or 18th century	Shops that were refronted in the 19th century, they are plastered and have a slate roof. There are three storeys and four bays. On the left is a gabled projection containing a door and shop window with plain surrounds. To the right is a shop front with a wooden entablature and colonettes, and between is a yard entry. The upper floors contain sash windows.	II
Fell Side Farmhouse; 54.20948°N 2.62344°W	—	Late 17th or early 18th century	The farmhouse was extended in the 19th century. It is plastered, and has a slate roof, two storeys, and three bays. On the front is a gabled porch with a modern door. The windows are sashes, those in the right two bays are mullioned.	II
Red Dragon Hotel; 54.20289°N 2.59693°W		17th or early 18th century	The public house was altered in the 19th century. It is rendered, with a wooden eaves cornice and a slate roof. There are two storeys and an attic, and two bays. The central doorway has fluted pilasters and an entablature. This is flanked by paired sash windows, in the upper floor are two pairs of sash windows in the centre, and in the roof is a continuous dormer.	II
Snooty Fox Tavern; 54.20221°N 2.59691°W		Late 17th or early 18th century	A public house on a plinth, plastered, with rusticated quoins and a slate roof. There are three storeys and five bays. In the ground floor is a doorway with an architrave, and to the right is an entrance with a chamfered segmental arch. Most of the windows are sashes.	II
John Dent Monument; 54.20366°N 2.59716°W	—	1709	The monument to John Dent is in the churchyard of St Mary's Church. It consists of a raised slab with a copper plate.	II
Rowland Tarham Monument; 54.20367°N 2.59700°W	—	1716	The monument to Rowland Tarham is in the churchyard of St Mary's Church. It consists of a table tomb with a gadrooned baluster and an inscription in Latin.	II
2 Mill Brow and stable 54.20316°N 2.59702°W	—	Early 18th century	Originally a house, later used for other purposes, it is in ashlar stone with a sill band, a wooden cornice, and a slate roof. There are three storeys and four bays. The doorway has a plain surround and a cornice on consoles, in the right bay is a yard entrance with a segmental head, and the windows are sash windows. At the rear is a 19th-century stable with a pitching hole, and a doorway with an architrave and a cornice on consoles.	II
8 Market Street; 54.20317°N 2.59764°W	—	18th century or earlier	A plastered shop with a slate roof, two storeys and three bays. In the ground floor is a double shop front with fluted pilaster strips and a cornice containing bow windows, and to the right is a door and a shop window with plain surrounds. In the upper floor are sash windows.	II
3 Beck Head and workshop 54.20333°N 2.59810°W	—	18th century	A pebbledashed house with a slate roof, two storeys and two bays. In the ground floor are two small rectangular bay windows, and a doorway with a plain surround, and in the upper floor are sash windows. At the rear is a stone workshop with a slate roof, three storeys, and stone steps leading up to the first floor doorway.	II
1 Fairbank and 2 Vicarage Lane; 54.20382°N 2.59854°W	—	18th century	A pair of stone cottages with quoins, a slate roof, and two storeys. On the Fairbank front are two bays, a doorway with a wooden lintel, and sash windows. On the Vicarage Lane front is a gabled porch with seats and a slate roof.	II
3 Fairbank; 54.20385°N 2.59866°W	—	18th century	Originally two houses, later combined into one, it is in stone with quoins, and a slate roof with coped gables and kneelers. There are two storeys, two sash windows and a doorway, and two blocked windows and a blocked doorway.	II
2 Horse Market; 54.20317°N 2.59621°W	—	18th century	A stone cottage with a slate roof, two storeys and two bays. Some of the windows have chamfered stone surrounds.	II
29 and 31 Main Street; 54.20207°N 2.59685°W	—	Mid 18th century	A pair of plastered buildings on a plinth, with quoins, a cornice, a slate roof, and two storeys. No. 29 to the right has a symmetrical front of three bays, and a door and windows with moulded surrounds. The windows are sashes, those in the outer bays having three lights, and in the middle bay one light. To the left is an extension, No. 31, with one bay, a shop front in the ground floor and a sash window above.	II
32 and 34 Main Street; 54.20212°N 2.59712°W	—	18th century (probable)	A pebbledashed shop with a slate roof, two storeys and two bays. In the ground floor are a fixed window, a doorway, and to the left a yard entry. In the upper floor are two sash windows.	II
36A Main Street; 54.20221°N 2.59713°W	—	18th century (probable)	A pebbledashed shop with a slate roof, two storeys and one bay. In the ground floor is a 19th-century shop front, and in the upper floor is a sash window.	II
41 Main Street; 54.20243°N 2.59686°W	—	18th century	A stone shop with a slate roof, two storeys and two bays. In the left bay is a yard entry with a segmental head, and to the right is shop front with Doric pilasters. The upper floor has two sash windows.	II
63 and 65 Main Street; 54.20297°N 2.59694°W		18th century	A pair of shop to which the rusticated plastered façade was added in the 19th century. It has a slate roof and three storeys, and each shop has two bays. In the ground floor are shop fronts and a passage on the right, and the upper floors contain sash windows. At the rear of No. 65 is a porch with Doric columns, pilasters and an entablature.	II
4 Market Street; 54.20318°N 2.59791°W	—	18th century	A stone shop on a plinth, with quoins, a slate roof, and three storeys. In the ground floor is a shop front incorporating two octagonal stone pillars, and the windows are sashes.	II
2 and 8 Vicarage Lane; 54.20402°N 2.59847°W	—	18th century	A pair of cottages later combined into a single dwelling, in stone with a slate roof and two storeys. The windows are sashes with plain surrounds.	II
Burrow Monument; 54.20357°N 2.59718°W	—	Mid 18th century	The monument to members of the Burrow family is in the churchyard of St Mary's Church. It consists of a raised slab.	II
Gatepiers to Cemetery; 54.20552°N 2.59831°W	—	18th century (probable)	Until 1949 the gate piers were at Town End House. They are in ashlar stone and have a square plan. Each pier has chamfered rustication, a cornice, and a gadrooned urn.	II
Former Fleece Inn; 54.20399°N 2.59908°W		18th century	A public house on a plinth, plastered, with quoins, a slate roof, three storeys and two bays. The central doorway has a canopy, and the windows are sashes. (Note: Street View in August 2016 shows that the name has been changed to the Orange Tree.)	II
Fountain House; 54.20311°N 2.59860°W	—	18th century	A stuccoed house on a plinth, with chamfered rusticated quoins, a modillion cornice and a slate roof. There are two storeys and symmetrical front of five bays. The central doorway has three-quarter Ionic columns, a pulvinated frieze, a modillion cornice, a pediment, and a rectangular fanlight, and the windows are sashes with plain surrounds. In front of the house is a low stone wall with railings and an overthrow.	II
Kearstwick Hill; 54.21511°N 2.60704°W		18th century	The house was extended in the 19th century. It is roughcast with a slate roof and two storeys, and consists of a small central block with larger flanking ranges. On the central block is a plaque with a cartouche and a date. Above the windows are hood moulds, and inside the central block is a large bressumer.	II
Monument to unknown person 54.20359°N 2.59720°W	—	18th century	The monument to an unknown person is in the churchyard of St Mary's Church. It consists of a table tomb with gadrooned sides.	II
Rose Cottage; 54.20240°N 2.59753°W	—	18th century	A stone house with a concrete tile roof, two storeys and two bays. The windows are sashes, and have plain surrounds.	II
Royal Hotel; 54.20188°N 2.59709°W		Mid 18th century	An inn on a corner site, incorporating an older house at the rear, in stone with chamfered rustication in the ground floor, a sill band, a dentilled and modillioned cornice, a blocking course, and a slate roof. There are two storeys and a symmetrical five-bay front. The central doorway has a porch with Ionic columns and pilasters, a pulvinated frieze, a modillion cornice and a pediment. To the right is a three-storey extension with a rounded corner, one bay on Main Street and five on New Road. It has a doorway with an open pediment on consoles. Most of the windows are sashes.	II
Wood End Farmhouse; 54.19721°N 2.60444°W	—	18th century	The farmhouse is in pebbledashed stone with a slate roof, two storeys, three bays, and a 19th-century extension to the left. The windows have chamfered surrounds, those in the upper floor are sashes, there is one mullioned window, and all but one have hood moulds. In the centre is a gabled porch and a doorway with a moulded surround.	II
Preston Monument; 54.20353°N 2.59735°W	—	1763	The monument to two members of the Preston family, the second dying in 1814, is in the churchyard of St Mary's Church. It consists of a table tomb with an inscription relating to the war service of the latter.	II
16 and 16A Main Street; 54.20134°N 2.59694°W	—	1765	A stuccoed house with quoins, a cornice, and a slate roof containing two gabled dormers. There are 2 1/2 storeys, and a symmetrical three-bay front with a single-bay extension to the right. The doorway has a chamfered surround, Doric pilasters, an entablature, and a rectangular fanlight. At the rear is a semicircular bay. The windows are sashes.	II
2 and 4 Beck Head and barn 54.20296°N 2.59830°W	—	1775	A stone house with rusticated quoins, a band, and a slate roof. There are two storeys and a symmetrical front of five bays. The central doorway has Doric pilasters, an entablature and a pediment. The windows are sashes with plain surrounds. At the rear is a stone barn with a hipped slate roof and round pitching holes.	II
Thomas Newby Monument; 54.20351°N 2.59771°W	—	1775	The monument to Thomas Newby is in the churchyard of St Mary's Church. It consists of a table tomb with fluted pilasters and round-headed niches.	II
18 Main Street; 54.20145°N 2.59698°W	—	Late 18th century	Originally two houses, later a shop, it is in stone with chamfered rusticated quoins on the left, and a slate roof. There are three storeys and two bays. In the ground floor are two 19th-century shop fronts with Doric pilasters and a cornice. Above the door is a rectangular fanlight, and the windows are sashes.	II
17 Mitchelgate; 54.20277°N 2.59951°W	—	Late 18th century	A stone house with a slate roof, two storeys, and a symmetrical three-bay front. It has a central doorway and sash windows, all with plain surrounds.	II
Fairbank Cottage and wall 54.20374°N 2.59898°W	—	Late 18th century	A stone house with quoins, a string course, and a slate roof with coped gables. There are two storeys, a central three-bay block, and flanking one-bay wings. In the centre is a semi-octagonal porch, and a doorway with a pediment. The windows are sashes, and a high wall containing a yard entrance connects the house to No. 4 Fairbank.	II
Town End House and The Courts; 54.20075°N 2.59651°W	—	1777	The house is in ashlar stone with a slate roof. It has two storeys with a basement, and six bays. The basement and ground floor are rusticated, there are two string courses and a modillion cornice. The doorway has two Doric columns, above which is a canted bay window. The windows are sashes. In front of the house are railings on a stone plinth with urn finials. The adjoining house to the left has sandstone gate piers with chamfered rustication and ball finials.	II
Rectory and St Mary's Lodge; 54.20433°N 2.59821°W		1783	The building, which was extended in the early 1830s, is in stone with quoins, a band, a projecting eaves cornice forming an open pediment on the gable ends, and a slate roof. There are three storeys and a symmetrical front of five bays. The doorway has a wooden surround and a hood on moulded consoles, and the windows are sashes. At the rear is a large bow window with curved windows.	II
Tiffin Monument; 54.20375°N 2.59786°W	—	1787	The monument to Thomas Tiffin is in the churchyard of St Mary's Church. It consists of a table tomb that has panels with sunk quatrefoils.	II
Turner Monument; 54.20347°N 2.59757°W	—	1790s	The monument to Richard Turner and members of his family is in the churchyard of St Mary's Church. It consists of a table tomb with fluted pilasters and with fluted paterae on the sides.	II
4 Horse Market; 54.20307°N 2.59607°W	—	1797	A stone house on a plinth, with rusticated quoins, a band and a slate roof. There are two storeys and a symmetrical front of three bays. The central doorway has a plain surround, a dated lintel, and a cornice. The windows are sashes with plain stone surrounds, and at the rear is a stair window.	II
9 Main Street, garden wall and gate piers 54.20115°N 2.59654°W	—	c. 1800	A house in ashlar stone on a plinth, with chamfered rusticated quoins, two bands, a cornice, and a slate roof. There are three storeys and three bays. The windows are sashes, the central window in the middle floor is blind with a round head and a triple keystone. The doorway facing the yard has a plain surround, and there is a blocked doorway facing the road. At the rear are two tall stair windows. Running from the rear is a garden wall with small rusticated piers. Extending from the right of the house is a later 19th-century extension in rubble, containing a large elliptical-headed recess containing a staircase to the middle floor, and beyond that is a blocked carriage entrance.	II
4 Church Street; 54.20325°N 2.59790°W	—	18th or 19th century	A stone house with a slate roof and two storeys.. The windows are sashes with sills.	II
4 and 6 Fairbank; 54.20394°N 2.59937°W	—	18th or 19th century	A pair of stone houses with quoins, a slate roof, and three storeys. Each house has a sash window in each floor, and above the doorway of No. 6 is a hood on consoles.	II
6 and 8 Horse Market; 54.20300°N 2.59601°W	—	Late 18th or early 19th century	A pair of stone cottages on a plinth with a slate roof. There are two storeys and three bays. In the centre are three doors with plain surrounds, the middle one leading to a passage. The windows have plain surrounds, and those of No. 8 are sashes.	II
10 and 12 Horse Market; 54.20294°N 2.59596°W	—	Late 18th or early 19th century	A pair of stone cottages on a plinth, with quoins on the left and a slate roof. There are two storeys and each cottage has one bay. The windows and doors have plain stone surrounds, and the windows are modern casements.	II
14 and 16 Horse Market; 54.20288°N 2.59590°W	—	Late 18th or early 19th century	Stone houses with quoins, a slate roof, and three storeys. The windows are sashes, and have plain surrounds.	II
35 Main Street; 54.20229°N 2.59692°W	—	18th or early 19th century	A plastered shop with a slate roof, three storeys and two bays. In the ground floor is a shop front with Composite pilasters and an entablature. The upper floors contain sash windows.	II
37 Main Street; 54.20232°N 2.59692°W	—	18th or early 19th century	A plastered shop on a plinth, with a slate roof containing a gabled dormer. There are 2 1/2 storeys and one bay. In the ground floor is a modern shop front, and the windows in the upper floors are sashes. At the rear is a doorway with a hood on consoles.	II
47 and 49 Main Street; 54.20256°N 2.59688°W	—	18th or early 19th century	The façade is on an older building that was originally part of an inn. The front is plastered, the roof is slated, and there are 3 1/2 storeys and three bays. In the ground floor is a yard entry with a segmental head to the left, and a shop front to the right. In the upper floors are sash windows with moulded sills and architraves, and in the roof is a continuous flat-roofed dormer. No. 49 is to the rear, it is in stone with a slate roof, and has two storeys, and the windows are sashes.	II
51 Main Street; 54.20261°N 2.59686°W	—	18th or early 19th century	A plastered shop with a slate roof, 3 1/2 storeys, and two bays. In the ground floor is a shop front with flanking pilasters and a cornice. Above are sash windows with architraves, those in the middle floor also with cornices on consoles. In the roof is a flat-roofed dormer, and at the rear is a two-storey extension.	II
67 Main Street; 54.20302°N 2.59701°W	—	18th or 19th century	A house with a rusticated plastered façade and a slate roof. There are three storeys and one bay, and the windows are sashes.	II
3 Mill Brow; 54.20316°N 2.59628°W	—	18th or 19th century	A stone house with quoins, a slate roof and three storeys. The windows are sashes with plain surrounds, there is a staircase window, and some doorways have been blocked.	II
2 Mitchelgate; 54.20294°N 2.59847°W	—	Late 18th or early 19th century	A pebbledashed house with a slate roof, two storeys, two bays, and a single-bay extension to the right. The doorway has a hood on moulded consoles, the ground floor windows are modern, and above the windows are paired with mullions.	II
4 Mitchelgate; 54.20286°N 2.59864°W	—	Late 18th or early 19th century	A stone house with quoins at the left side, and a slate roof. There are two storeys and three bays. The windows are sashes, there is a modern door, and at the extreme right is a passage entrance.	II
6 and 8 Mitchelgate; 54.20282°N 2.59874°W	—	Late 18th or early 19th century	The house is in stone with a slate roof, two storeys and three bays. It has a plain central doorway and sash windows.	II
10 Mitchelgate; 54.20282°N 2.59875°W	—	Late 18th or early 19th century	A stone house with quoins, a slate roof, two storeys and one bay. The doorway has a plain surround, and the windows are casements.	II
14 Mitchelgate; 54.20279°N 2.59889°W	—	Late 18th or early 19th century	A stone house with a slate roof, three storeys and two bays. It has a plain doorway, sash windows, and a passage entry at the extreme left.	II
16 Mitchelgate; 54.20276°N 2.59897°W	—	Late 18th or early 19th century	A stone house with a slate roof, two storeys and two bays. The windows have plain surrounds, and one of them is sashed.	II
Biggins Cottage and outbuilding 54.19873°N 2.61371°W		Late 18th or early 19th century	The house and outbuilding are in stone with quoins, a slate roof, and two storeys. The house has an eaves cornice, and a symmetrical front of three bays. The doorway has a cornice on consoles, and the windows are sashes. The outbuilding is to the left and is at right angles.	II
Cherkeby Cottages; 54.20334°N 2.59795°W	—	18th or 19th century	A row of stone houses with some quoins, a slate roof, and three storeys. The windows are sashes with thin stone surrounds, and the doors are modern.	II
Gazebo; 54.20435°N 2.59728°W		Late 18th or early 19th century	The gazebo, formerly in the vicarage garden, is in the churchyard of St Mary's Church. It is an octagonal stone structure with two storeys, quoins, a band, and coping. Steps with railings lead up to a first floor entrance. The other alternate faces contain a doorway, and above a round-headed window with impost blocks and keystones. On the top are cement blocks imitating battlements.	II
Milestone; 54.20072°N 2.59627°W		18th or early 19th century	The milestone on Main Street is triangular and is inscribed with the distances in miles to London, Settle, Clapham, and Ingleton.	II
Rose Tree Cottage; 54.20201°N 2.60191°W	—	18th or early 19th century	Originally an inn, later a private house, it is in stone with quoins and a slate roof. There are two storeys and three bays. The doorway has a chamfered surround, and the windows are sashes.	II
The Courtyard; 54.20397°N 2.59893°W	—	1811	A stone house with quoins and a slate roof, later divided into two dwellings. There are three storeys, and a symmetrical front of four bays with a central yard entrance. The doorways are in the passage, most of the windows are sashes, and in the third and fourth bays are gabled half-dormers with bargeboards.	II
Mill Brow House; 54.20323°N 2.59542°W	—	1811	This originated as a workhouse and has since been divided into flats. It is in stone, on a plinth, and has quoins and a slate roof. There are three storeys and a basement, four bays, and a doorway with a plain surround. Attached to the rear is a former mill that has two and three storeys, and a doorway with a segmental head and a fanlight.	II
Theobalds Monument; 54.20361°N 2.59798°W	—	1818	The monument to Edward Theobalds is in the churchyard of St Mary's Church. It consists of a table tomb with triple colonnettes and panels with cusped heads.	II
Library; 54.20232°N 2.59780°W	—	1820	The library originated as a Sandemanian chapel. It is in stone with quoins, and a slate roof. There are two storeys on the east side, and one on the west. On the sides are round-headed windows with plain surrounds, keystones and impost blocks. There is a 20th-century porch and a doorway with a fanlight.	II
Monument in the form of an obelisk 54.20367°N 2.59812°W	—	1821	The monument is in the churchyard of St Mary's Church, and it commemorates the loss of five women in a fire the previous year. The monument consists of an obelisk on a pedestal. On the pedestal is an inscribed plaque, and on the other sides are biblical texts.	II
1–15 Market Square; 54.20166°N 2.59640°W		1822	A row of shops and houses forming the south side of Market Square. They are in stone with three storeys, and each building has two bays. In the ground floor are 19th-century shop fronts, some with bow windows and others with Doricpilasters and a cornice, and yard entries. In the upper floors are sash windows.	II
Abbeyfield Lodge; 54.20444°N 2.59984°W	—	1825	A house in ashlar stone with a slate roof and two storeys. It has two shaped gables, clasping buttresses rising to spear-shaped finials, and a datestone.	II
The Gables; 54.20439°N 2.59942°W	—	1825	The house was extended in 1866, and is in Tudor style. Both parts have slate roofs. The earlier part is pebbledashed with a symmetrical front of three bays. In the centre is a two-storey porch with a triangular gable and three finials, and to the right is a shaped gable. The doorway is in Tudor style with a hood mould. The windows have chamfered surrounds and mullions, and in the ground floor they also have transoms and hood moulds. The later part to the left is in ashlar stone with a shaped gable and a single-storey gabled porch.	II
5 Beck Head; 54.20318°N 2.59826°W	—	Early 19th century	A rendered house with rusticated quoins, a band, and a slate roof. There are three storeys, two bays, and a doorway and sash windows with plain surrounds.	II
11 Fairbank; 54.20400°N 2.59919°W	—	Early 19th century	A stone house with a slate roof, three storeys and one bay. The doorway has three-quarter Doric columns and an entablature, and the windows are sashes.	II
13 Fairbank; 54.20402°N 2.59923°W	—	Early 19th century	A stone house with a slate roof, three storeys and one bay. The doorway has wooden Doric pilasters and an entablature. The windows are sashes with plain surrounds.	II
15 Fairbank; 54.20403°N 2.59928°W	—	Early 19th century	A stone house with a slate roof, three storeys and one bay. The doorway is at the rear, and the windows are sashes. The curved corner into the yard is built with large blocks.	II
10 Main Street; 54.20115°N 2.59683°W	—	Early 19th century	A stone house on a plinth, with two sill bands, a plain frieze, and a slate roof. There are two storeys and three bays. In the centre is a doorway approached by steps, with a plain surround and an open pediment on consoles. To the right is a passage doorway, and the windows are sashes, some coupled.	II
11 and 13 Main Street; 54.20130°N 2.59664°W	—	Early 19th century	A pair of stone shops with a slate roof and three storeys. Each shop has one bay. In the ground floor are 19th-century shop fronts with Doric pilasters and a cornice, and above are sash windows.	II
17 and 19 Main Street; 54.20142°N 2.59669°W	—	Early 19th century	A house and a shop in stone with a slate roof, three storeys and three bays. In the ground floor is a shop front with Doric pilasters and a cornice, to the left is a doorway with a plain surround and a modern window. The upper floors contain sash windows.	II
20 and 22 Main Street; 54.20151°N 2.59697°W	—	Early 19th century	Behind the front is probably an older house. It is in stone with rusticated quoins, bands, and a slate roof with a flat coped gable. All the windows are sashes. In the ground floor, to the left, is a doorway with a plain stone surround and a fanlight, and there are three windows to the right. In the upper floors are coupled windows, those in the top floor with round heads.	II
21 and 23 Main Street; 54.20149°N 2.59671°W	—	Early 19th century	A house and a shop in stone with a slate roof, three storeys and three bays. In the ground floor is a shop front and an altered window. The upper floors contain blind windows in the middle bays, and sash windows in the outer bays.	II
32 Main Street and 1 New Road; 54.20205°N 2.59711°W	—	Early 19th century	A shop on a corner site, in stone, with a string course, an eaves cornice, and a slate roof. There are three storeys, one bay on Market Street, four on New Street, and a canted corner. On the New Street front is a doorway with a cornice on consoles, and there is a plain doorway in the corner. Elsewhere in the ground floor are shop front, there are sash windows in the middle floor, and casements in the top floor.	II
39 Main Street; 54.20236°N 2.59690°W	—	Early 19th century	A stone shop with a slate roof, three storeys and one bay. In the ground floor is a shop front with paired Doric pilasters and a cornice. Above is a fixed window in the middle floor, and a sash window in the top floor.	II
48, 50 and 52 Main Street; 54.20249°N 2.59715°W	—	Early 19th century	A row of three plastered shops with a slate roof and 2 1/2 storeys. The ground floor is rusticated, and contains shop fronts. The shop front of No. 48 has Doric pilasters. In the upper floors are sash windows in plain surrounds.	II
58 Main Street; 54.20271°N 2.59717°W	—	Early 19th century	Behind the shop front is probably an older building. The building is in stone on a plinth, with bands, a cornice, and a slate roof. There are three storeys and three bays. In the ground floor is a double shop front with Doric pilasters and a cornice. The windows are sashes with plain surrounds.	II
62, 64 and 66 Main Street and cottage behind 54.20285°N 2.59721°W	—	Early 19th century	A row of two shops and a bank, in stone with a slate roof. There are three storeys and five bays. The central bay projects forward and contains an archway, above which is a blind arch containing the upper floor windows, the central one having a cornice on consoles. To the left of the arch are shop fronts with Corinthian pilasters, and to the right is a modern bank front. In the upper floors are sash windows, and at the rear is a two-storey stone cottage with a slate roof and sash windows.	II
2 Market Square; 54.20200°N 2.59681°W	—	Early 19th century	A stone shop with a slate roof and two bays. It has a rounded corner containing a double shop front with Doric pilasters. The windows are sashes.	II
1 Market Street; 54.20304°N 2.59811°W	—	Early 19th century	A stone house, rendered on the front, with a slate roof. There are three storeys and two bays. The windows are sashes, and have plain surrounds, as does the doorway.	II
10 and 12 Market Street and outbuildings 54.20318°N 2.59744°W	—	Early 19th century	A pair of stone shops on a plinth, with a string course, quoins on the left, and a slate roof. There are three storeys, and each shop has two bays. In the ground floor are a double shop front flanked by Doric pilasters and with a continuous cornice. In the upper floor are sash windows, at the rear is a stair windows, and outbuildings.	II
11 Market Street; 54.20304°N 2.59763°W	—	Early 19th century	A stone shop with a slate roof, three storeys and four bays. In the ground floor is a yard entrance with a segmental head, and to the right is a shop front with Doric pilasters and a cornice. The upper floors contain sash windows.	II
19 and 21 Mitchelgate; 54.20270°N 2.59965°W	—	Early 19th century	A pair of stone houses with rusticated quoins on the right, and a slate roof. In the centre are paired doorways, the windows in No. 19 are modern, in No. 21 they are sashes, and above the doorway is a blocked window with a mullion. All openings have plain stone surrounds.	II
31 Mitchelgate; 54.20261°N 2.59992°W	—	Early 19th century	A stone house with rusticated quoins, a string course, and a slate roof. There are two storeys and two bays. The square windows have plain stone surrounds with modern glazing, and the doorway is modern.	II
3–11 New Road; 54.20209°N 2.59753°W	—	Early 19th century	Originally a row of five houses, most since converted into shops with living accommodation above. They are in stone with a slate roof, three storeys, and one bay to each unit. At the ends are giant Doric pilasters with discs in the capitals, and an entablature that continues as an eaves cornice. In the ground floor are shop fronts, doorways and sash windows, and in the upper floor most windows are sashes.	II
13 New Road; 54.20213°N 2.59771°W	—	Early 19th century	A stone house with a sill band, an eaves cornice, and a hipped slate roof. There are two storeys, the front on Chapel Lane is symmetrical with three bays, and there are two bays facing New Road. On the front is a trellis porch and a doorway with Doric pilasters and a cornice. The windows are sashes.	II
12 Queen's Square; 54.20353°N 2.59870°W	—	Early 19th century	A stone house with quoins, a string course, a cornice with brackets, and a slate roof. There are two storeys and four bays. In the centre is a yard entrance with a segmental arch and a triple keystone. The windows are sashes, and the window above the arch is coupled.	II
Biggins House; 54.19831°N 2.61367°W	—	Early 19th century	A stone house on a plinth, with chamfered rusticated quoins, a sill band, a cornice, and a slate roof. There are two storeys, three bays, and a later three-bay extension to the right. The doorway has a Doric porch with two columns, pilasters and an entablature. The windows are sashes with plain surrounds. The extension is pebbledashed, and has a panel carved with a coat of arms.	II
Biggins Lodge Farmhouse and barn 54.19886°N 2.61338°W	—	Early 19th century	The farmhouse is in stone with a slate roof. There are two storeys at the front, three at the back, and three bays. The windows are sashes with Gothick heads, and the doorway in the right gabled return has a Gothick fanlight. To the side is an embattled wall, at the rear is a block with casement windows, and behind this is a barn with a moulded timber lintel.	II
Church Brow Cottage; 54.20430°N 2.59697°W	—	Early 19th century	The cottage is in picturesque style, built in stone with quoins, an eaves cornice, and a hipped slate roof with lead ridges. There are two storeys, and the windows are casements with Gothic lights. A triple window has been converted, with the central light a door, and the outer lights blocked.	II*
Ivy Cottage and Keeper's Cottage; 54.21266°N 2.60442°W	—	Early 19th century	A pair of pebbledashed houses at right angles, with slate roofs. They have two storeys, and the windows, most of which are sashes, have plain stone surrounds.	II
Spital Farmhouse; 54.21365°N 2.64901°W	—	Early 19th century	The farmhouse is plastered with a hipped slate roof. It has an L-shaped plan and two storeys. The windows are casements with Gothic-style heads.	II
Tearnside Cottage and barn 54.20897°N 2.63331°W	—	Early 19th century	A house with a barn attached to the right, in stone with a slate roof and two storeys. The house has a Doric porch with two columns and a cornice. The windows are sashes, and at the rear is a staircase window. On the gable of the barn is a ball finial.	II
Gate piers, Underley Lodge; 54.20898°N 2.60387°W		Early 19th century	The gate piers at the entrance to the drive to Underley Lodge are in Jacobean style. They have a square plan with Doric pilasters, entablatures, and heavily scrolled finials.	II
Kearstwick Cottages; 54.21396°N 2.60571°W	—	First half of 19th century	A pair of stone cottages with a slate roof, two storeys and a Z-shaped plan. Each cottage has a timber porch with a slate roof, and the windows are casements with latticed glazing.	II
Underley Hall School; 54.21556°N 2.59183°W	—	1825–28	This was built as a country house designed by George Webster in Jacobean style, it was extended in 1872 by Paley and Austin, and later used as a school. The building is in ashlar stone with slate roofs with lead cupolas, and has two storeys. The south front has seven bays with mullioned and transomed windows, an openwork parapet, and turrets with cupolas at each end. There is a two-storey porch with coupled columns, Doric in the ground floor, and Ionic above. The east font has five bays, and contains a single-storey Roman Doric tetrastyle porch. On the west side is the service wing with gabled dormers, and a three-stage tower. The newer part is to the north, and includes a four-stage tower.	II*
Jingling End; 54.20185°N 2.59505°W	—	1829	A stone house that was extended later in the century, it is on a plinth, with chamfered rusticated quoins, a string course, a wooden cornice, and a slate roof, hipped at the rear. There are two storeys, and the original part has a symmetrical three-bay front. The central doorway is set in a blind arch, and there is a trellis porch. The windows are sashes, and in the extension to the left is a coupled round-headed window with a transom.	II
17 and 19 Fairbank; 54.20410°N 2.59942°W	—	Early to mid 19th century	Two stone houses on a plinth, in Tudor Gothic style, with slate roofs. No. 17, facing the road has four bays, the outer bays projecting forward and having coped gables with finials. The doorway has a triangular head and a hood mould. The two central windows in the upper floor have mullions, and the other windows also have transoms and hood moulds. No. 19 faces the square to the left, it is pebbledashed with three bays, the outer bays projecting forward and gabled as No. 17.	II
5 and 7 Queen's Square; 54.20335°N 2.59846°W	—	Early to mid 19th century	A pair of stone houses with chamfered rusticated quoins, a band, a slate roof, and three storey with cellars. The doorways are paired in the centre, and have plain stone surrounds and fanlights. There is one window in each floor; sashes in the lower two floors, and casements in the top floor.	II
Biggins Hall Farmhouse; 54.19850°N 2.61245°W	—	Early to mid 19th century	The farmhouse is in stone with rusticated quoins, a slate roof, two storeys and three bays. There is a central doorway, and windows with moulded hood moulds and modern glazing.	II
Hawes Cottage; 54.22058°N 2.59569°W	—	Early to mid 19th century	A cottage in Tudor Gothic style, in stone with a slate roof. There are two storeys and four bays. The windows are sashes with Gothic heads and hood moulds, and the doorway is similar.	II
Schoolroom, Queen Elizabeth Grammar School; 54.20137°N 2.60389°W	—	1846	The schoolroom is in stone on a plinth with a slate roof, one storey and three bays. The windows are casements with chamfered surrounds and moulded hood moulds. Above the central window is a re-set inscribed plaque, and in the right gable end is a lettered panel. Entrances with embattled porches were added in 1903.	II
Trustee Savings Bank; 54.20187°N 2.59604°W		1847	The bank, designed by Miles Thompson, is ashlar stone, with a rusticated ground floor, a string course, a frieze, an eaves cornice, and a hipped slate roof. There are two storeys and three bays, the central bay projecting forward, and containing a porch with paired Doric pilasters and an entablature. The entrance has a rounded moulded arch with a keystone, and a doorway in an architrave. Above the porch is a balcony, a window with two rounded lights, a clock face, a pediment and a bellcote. The upper floor is flanked by paired corner pilasters. The other windows are sashes in architraves, those in the ground floor having cornices.	II
1 Beck Head; 54.20334°N 2.59789°W	—	19th century	A stone cottage with a slate roof and two storeys. It contains a sash window, and has a modern door.	II
8 and 12 Fairbank; 54.20401°N 2.59956°W	—	Mid 19th century	A pair of stone cottages with a slate roof. There are two storeys, and each cottage has two bays. In the right bay of No. 8 is a passage. Above the doors are canopies, the windows of No. 8 are sashes, and those of No. 12 are casements.	II
14 and 16 Fairbank; 54.20403°N 2.59964°W	—	Mid 19th century	A pair of stone cottages with a slate roof. There are two storeys, and each cottage has two bays. Above the doors are canopies, and the windows are casements.	II
18 Fairbank and smithy 54.20411°N 2.59984°W	—	Mid 19th century	A cottage with a former smithy attached to the right. They are in stone with a slate roof, and have two storeys. The cottage has two bays, a doorway with a canopy, and casement windows. The former smithy has various openings, including a segmental-headed entrance.	II
25 Main Street; 54.20155°N 2.59676°W	—	19th century	A stone house with a slate roof, three storeys and one bay. In the ground floor is a shop window and in the upper floors are sash windows.	II
45 Main Street; 54.20249°N 2.59686°W		Mid 19th century	A stuccoed shop with a cornice and a slate roof. There are 2 1/2 storeys and two bays. In the ground floor is a shop front with Doric pilasters and an entablature. The doorway has a segmental fanlight, and the windows have segmental heads. The windows are sashes, those in the middle floor have flattened pediments, and in the top floor they have a segmental cornice above the roofline.	II
57 Main Street; 54.20282°N 2.59687°W	—	19th century	A plastered shop on a stone plinth, with a slate roof, three storeys and two bays. In the ground floor is a shop front flanked by Doric pilasters, and above are sash windows.	II
69 Main Street and adjoining range 54.20307°N 2.59699°W	—	Mid 19th century	A stone shop with chamfered rusticated quoins, a wooden cornice, and a slate roof. There are three storeys and a front of three bays. On the ground floor is a double shop front with Doric pilasters, and the windows are sashes. At the rear is a stone range with three storeys, two bays and windows. most of which are sashes.	II
2 Market Street; 54.20318°N 2.59802°W	—	Mid 19th century	A shop, plastered, on a plinth, with a slate roof. The gable faces the street and has bargeboards and a pendant. There are two storeys with an attic, and two bays. In the ground floor is a double shop front with flanking Doric pilasters and a frieze, and in the upper floor and attic are sash windows.	II
13 and 15 Market Street; 54.20306°N 2.59757°W	—	19th century	A stone shop with a slate roof and three storeys. In the ground floor is a shop front with Doric pilasters and a cornice, and above are sash windows with plain surrounds.	II
14 Market Street; 54.20317°N 2.59736°W	—	19th century	The building is in stone with a string course, a slate roof, three storeys and two bays. The windows are sashes.	II
16 and 18 Market Street and outbuildings 54.20316°N 2.59727°W	—	19th century	A pebbledashed shop with a slate roof, three storeys and three bays. In the ground floor is an entry in the left bay with quoins in the right jamb, and to the right is a shop front with flanking Doric pilasters and a cornice. Above are sash windows, two in the middle floor and three in the top floor. At the rear are outbuildings in a similar style.	II
20 Market Street; 54.20315°N 2.59718°W	—	19th century	A pebbledashed shop with a slate roof, three storeys and two bays. In the ground floor is a shop front with flanking Doric pilasters and a cornice. In the upper floors are sash windows.	II
4 Mill Brow; 54.20318°N 2.59690°W		19th century	A stone house with a slate roof, two storeys and two bays. It has a central doorway, one fixed window, and the other windows are sashes.	II
6 Mill Brow; 54.20319°N 2.59675°W	—	19th century	A stone house with quoins on the right, and a slate roof. It has two storeys and three bays. The windows are sashes, and the door is modern.	II
10 Mill Brow; 54.20338°N 2.59665°W		19th century	A stone house with quoins, a slate roof and 2 1/2 storeys, in Tudor style. The gabled front facing Mill Brow contains two-light sash windows with double-chamfered surrounds, mullions, and hood moulds. The doorway has an arched head with quatrefoils in the spandrels. On the sides and rear are tall windows with Gothic heads and lattice glazing.	II
Laundry Cottage; 54.19883°N 2.61397°W	—	19th century	A stone house with a slate roof, two storeys, two bays, and a rear outshut. The windows are casements in plain surrounds, there is a small round-headed opening in the gable, and a blocked entry.	II
Milestone; 54.21245°N 2.63911°W		19th century	The milestone is on the north side of the A65 road. It has a triangular plan, and is inscribed with the distances in miles to Kirkby Lonsdale, Kendal and Milnthorpe.	II
Underley Home Farm Farmyard (front range); 54.21286°N 2.60235°W	—	Mid 19th century	The building is in stone with rusticated quoins and a slate roof. There are two round-headed doorways with impost blocks, rusticated jambs and voussoirs, one of which has a fanlight. The windows are sashes, on one gable is a spike finial, and on a recessed gable is a clock with a circular surround.	II
Former weigh house 54.20325°N 2.59644°W	—	19th century	The weigh house is in stone with quoins and a slate roof. There are two doorways, each approached by stone steps.	II
Market House; 54.20302°N 2.59730°W	—	1854–55	The market hall, which incorporates rooms for other functions, was designed by Miles Thompson, and turns the corner between Main Street and Market Street. It is in stone on a plinth, the plinth and ground floor are rusticated, and it has imposts bands, a cornice, and a slate roof. There are two storeys and nine bays. The ground floor consists of an arcade, originally open, now all but one arch filled with shop windows. In the upper floor are round-headed sash windows with panels beneath, and on the top of the building is a raised panel containing the date and scrolls.	II
National Westminster Bank; 54.20269°N 2.59689°W	—	1855	The bank is in ashlar stone on a plinth, with a band, an entablature, a blocking course, a slate roof, and a rusticated ground floor. There are two storeys with attics, and front of seven bays. The fourth and fifth bays project forward under a pediment. There are two doorways, each with a cornice on consoles and a fanlight. Most of the windows are sashes, and beneath the ground floor windows are recessed panels. In the roof is a hipped dormer.	II
Kearstwick Lodge; 54.21298°N 2.60442°W		1857	A stone house with quoins, and a slate roof with coped gables and corbelled kneelers. There are two storeys and three bays, the right bay projecting and gabled with a ball finial. The windows have chamfered stone mullions and hood moulds, and in the gable is a carved plaque.	II
Dutch barn northeast of Home Farm farmhouse 54.21427°N 2.60173°W	—	After 1859	The Dutch barn consists of a pitched corrugated tin roof carried on twelve rusticated stone piers.	II
Dutch barn southwest of Home Farm farmhouse 54.21444°N 2.60155°W	—	After 1859	The Dutch barn consists of a pitched corrugated tin roof carried on twelve rusticated stone piers.	II
High Moorgate; 54.21881°N 2.61441°W	—	After 1859	A row of four stone houses with quoins, slate roofs, and two storeys. There are three projecting gabled wings with dormers between, all with bargeboards. The windows are casements with lattice glazing, and they have hood moulds. The doorways have plain surrounds and slate hoods on wooden brackets.	II
Low Moorgate; 54.21816°N 2.61116°W	—	After 1859	A row of four stone houses with slate roofs and two storeys. There are two projecting gabled wings with dormers between, all with bargeboards. The doorways have hipped hoods. In front of the gardens is a stone wall with dressed coping.	II
Stables, The Gables; 54.20416°N 2.59927°W	—	1866	A building in ashlar stone that has a gabled slate roof. It contains chamfered slit windows and has a datestone.	II
Home Farm Cottage; 54.21482°N 2.60112°W	—	c. 1870	The cottage is in limestone with red sandstone dressings, a slate roof half-hipped on one gable, and is in Tudor Gothic style. It has an L-shaped plan, two storeys, and three half-dormers. The windows are casements with lattice glazing, straight heads, and hood moulds. The doorway is in the angle, and is in Tudor style.	II
Game larder 54.21488°N 2.60092°W	—	1871	The octagonal game larder is in limestone with rusticated sandstone quoins and dressings, and a slate roof with lead ridges. There is a wooden cornice with pendants at the corners, the doorway has a triangular head, and above it is a panel with the date and a monogram. The windows have segmental heads and louvred shutters.	II
Home Farm Farmhouse, game larder and coach-house 54.21365°N 2.60264°W	—	1872	The farmhouse is in limestone with sandstone dressings, a slate roof, and two storeys. It is in Tudor Gothic style and has a complex plan. Most of the windows have two lights and hood moulds, there are two canted bay windows, a canted porch, and a Tudor doorway above which is a plaque with a date and a monogram. The gables have decorated bargeboards and finials. Attached at the left is a coach house with segmental arches, from which a wall leads to an octagonal game larder with a mullioned and transomed window.	II
Underley Bridge; 54.22058°N 2.60094°W		1872–75	The bridge carries a roadway over the River Lune. It is in stone, and consists of two equal segmental arches and a smaller segmental arch to the north. The pier between the equal arches has triangular cutwaters that rise to form pedestrian refuges. The parapets are embattled, those on the main arches being corbelled. On the smaller arch are panels with armorial bearings.	II
Underley Lodge; 54.20905°N 2.60368°W		Late 19th century	The lodge is in brick with sandstone dressings, some applied timber-framing, and a red tiled half-hipped roof. It is in Tudor style. There are two storeys, parts of the upper storey are jettied, and on the front are three gables with pierced bargeboards. The windows have three lights and chamfered surrounds, they contain ornamental lattice glazing, and those in the ground floor are mullioned.	II
Home Farm Stable; 54.21527°N 2.60037°W	—	1882	The stable is in limestone with a slate roof, and has an octagonal plan. There is a doorway with a hood mould in each face. On one face is a gabled dormer and a panel containing a monogram and the date.	II
Kearstwick Institute; 54.21348°N 2.60454°W	—	1902	A memorial hall in free Gothic style, it is in stone and has a hipped slate roof with small gablets. On the front facing the road are two large gabled Gothic windows in the centre, flanked by dissimilar doorways. The windows have arched heads, mullions and transoms, ogee heads, and a circle at the top. The left doorway has a flat head and a trefoil tympanum, and the right doorway has moulded jambs. Beside each doorway is a plaque.	II
Market Cross, Market Place; 54.20183°N 2.59670°W		1905	The building is in Tudor Gothic style, it is built in stone, and consists of an octagonal canopy with a low pyramidal slate roof. There are eight arches with leaf decoration in the spandrels. The piers have stepped buttresses containing round-headed niches, and each is surmounted by an obelisk and a ball. The frieze is inscribed, above it is an embattled parapet, and on the apex of the roof is a large stone cross.	II
Churchyard Gates; 54.20339°N 2.59783°W		Early 20th century	The gates at the entrance to the churchyard of St Mary's Church are in wrought iron. They have two ornate pillars, and there is a central arch with initials and a date.	II
Cross Cottage; 54.20339°N 2.59677°W	—	Undated	A stone house with a slate roof, two storeys and three bays. The windows at the front are sash window, and at the rear is a small Gothic window.	II
Monument to Dorothy Cartwright; 54.20372°N 2.59702°W	—	Undated	The monument is in the churchyard of St Mary's Church, and consists of a table tomb.	II

== Notes and references ==
=== Sources ===
- Historic England, "Church of St Mary, Kirkby Lonsdale (1145774)", National Heritage List for England
- Historic England, "Market Cross, Mill Brow, Kirkby Lonsdale (1145765)", National Heritage List for England
- Historic England, "High Biggins Old Hall, Kirkby Lonsdale (1145801)", National Heritage List for England
- Historic England, "Devil's Bridge, Kirkby Lonsdale (1086899)", National Heritage List for England
- Historic England, "Devil's Bridge, Kirkby Lonsdale (1007209)", National Heritage List for England
- Historic England, "Nos. 5, 7 (Kings Arms) and 9 Market Street, Kirkby Lonsdale (1145759)", National Heritage List for England
- Historic England, "Deans Biggin farmhouse, Kirkby Lonsdale (1318967)", National Heritage List for England
- Historic England, "Low Biggins (Nether Riggs), Kirkby Lonsdale (1145800)", National Heritage List for England
- Historic England, "Nos. 54 and 56 Main Street, Kirkby Lonsdale (1146364)", National Heritage List for England
- Historic England, "Abbot Hall, Kirkby Lonsdale (1311673)", National Heritage List for England
- Historic England, "Scar Brow, Kirkby Lonsdale (1145755)", National Heritage List for England
- Historic England, "Sun Inn and block to rear now part of Sun Inn, Kirkby Lonsdale (1145761)", National Heritage List for England
- Historic England, "Summerhouse to south of Green Close, Kirkby Lonsdale (1311887)", National Heritage List for England
- Historic England, "Tearnside Hall and attached stable and barn, Kirkby Lonsdale (1145782)", National Heritage List for England
- Historic England, "Old Manor House, Kirkby Lonsdale (1145766)", National Heritage List for England
- Historic England, "Nos. 40, 42A, 42B and 44 Main Street, Kirkby Lonsdale (1146348)", National Heritage List for England
- Historic England, "Fell Side farmhouse, Kirkby Lonsdale (1145783)", National Heritage List for England
- Historic England, "Red Dragon Hotel, Kirkby Lonsdale (1145796)", National Heritage List for England
- Historic England, "Snooty Fox Tavern, Kirkby Lonsdale (1145793)", National Heritage List for England
- Historic England, "Monument to John Dent in the churchyard to east of Church of St Mary, Kirkby Lonsdale (1158139)", National Heritage List for England
- Historic England, "Monument to Rowland Tarham in the churchyard to east of Church of St Mary, Kirkby Lonsdale (1318940)", National Heritage List for England
- Historic England, "No. 2 Mill Brow and attached stable, Kirkby Lonsdale (1318937)", National Heritage List for England
- Historic England, "No. 8 Market Street, Kirkby Lonsdale (1157934)", National Heritage List for England
- Historic England, "No. 3 Beck Head and workshop at rear, Kirkby Lonsdale (1318926)", National Heritage List for England
- Historic England, "No. 1 Fairbank, Kirkby Lonsdale (1311967)", National Heritage List for England
- Historic England, "No. 3 Fairbank, Kirkby Lonsdale (1145808)", National Heritage List for England
- Historic England, "No. 3 Horse Market, Kirkby Lonsdale (1318941)", National Heritage List for England
- Historic England, "Nos. 29 and 31 Main Street, Kirkby Lonsdale (1145792)", National Heritage List for England
- Historic England, "Nos. 32 and 34 Main Street, Kirkby Lonsdale (1146322)", National Heritage List for England
- Historic England, "No. 36A Main Street, Kirkby Lonsdale (1145786)", National Heritage List for England
- Historic England, "No. 41 Main Street, Kirkby Lonsdale (1145794)", National Heritage List for England
- Historic England, "Nos. 63 and 65 Main Street, Kirkby Lonsdale (1145753)", National Heritage List for England
- Historic England, "No. 4 Market Street, Kirkby Lonsdale (1311720)", National Heritage List for England
- Historic England, "Nos. 2 and 8 Vicarage Lane, Kirkby Lonsdale (1145738)", National Heritage List for England
- Historic England, "Monument to the Burrow Family in the churchyard east of Church of St Mary, Kirkby Lonsdale (1158113)", National Heritage List for England
- Historic England, "Gatepiers to Cemetery north of Cockpit Hill, Kirkby Lonsdale (1145775)", National Heritage List for England
- Historic England, "Fleece Inn, Kirkby Lonsdale (1318929)", National Heritage List for England
- Historic England, "Fountain House, Kirkby Lonsdale (1145799)", National Heritage List for England
- Historic England, "Kearstwick Hill, Kirkby Lonsdale (1145781)", National Heritage List for England
- Historic England, "Unknown Monument to south of monument to the Burrow Family in the churchyard east of Church of St Mary, Kirkby Lonsdale (1145732)", National Heritage List for England
- Historic England, "Rose Cottage, Kirkby Lonsdale (1145805)", National Heritage List for England
- Historic England, "Royal Hotel, Kirkby Lonsdale (1318948)", National Heritage List for England
- Historic England, "Wood End farmhouse, Kirkby Lonsdale (1318928)", National Heritage List for England
- Historic England, "Monument to Christopher Preston 1763 and Achilles Preston 1814 in the churchyard and to the south of the Church of St Mary, Kirkby Lonsdale (1158155)", National Heritage List for England
- Historic England, "Nos. 16 and 16A Main Street, Kirkby Lonsdale (1318947)", National Heritage List for England
- Historic England, "Nos. 2 and 4 Beck Head with barn attached at rear, Kirkby Lonsdale (1145797)", National Heritage List for England
- Historic England, "Monument to Thomas Newby in the churchyard south of Church of St Mary, Kirkby Lonsdale (1311635)", National Heritage List for England
- Historic England, "No. 18 Main Street, Kirkby Lonsdale (1138361)", National Heritage List for England
- Historic England, "No. 17 Michelgate, Kirkby Lonsdale (1145771)", National Heritage List for England
- Historic England, "Fairbank Cottage and wall between Fairbank Cottage and No. 4 Fairbank, Kirkby Lonsdale (1311947)", National Heritage List for England
- Historic England, "Town End House and The Courts, Kirkby Lonsdale (1145784)", National Heritage List for England
- Historic England, "Monument to Thomas Tiffin in the churchyard to the west of the Church of St Mary, Kirkby Lonsdale (1145733)", National Heritage List for England
- Historic England, "Rectory and St Mary's Lodge, Kirkby Lonsdale (1318959)", National Heritage List for England
- Historic England, "Monument to Richard Turner and family in the churchyard and to the south of the Church of St Mary, Kirkby Lonsdale (1318955)", National Heritage List for England
- Historic England, "No. 4 Horse Market, Kirkby Lonsdale (1145776)", National Heritage List for England
- Historic England, "No. 9 Main Street, garden wall and gate piers fronting road immediately to north, Kirkby Lonsdale (1146420)", National Heritage List for England
- Historic England, "No. 4 Church Street, Kirkby Lonsdale (1145806)", National Heritage List for England
- Historic England, "Nos. 4 and 6 Fairbank, Kirkby Lonsdale (1318931)", National Heritage List for England
- Historic England, "Nos. 6 and 8 Horse Market, Kirkby Lonsdale (1145777)", National Heritage List for England
- Historic England, "Nos. 10 and 12 Horse Market, Kirkby Lonsdale (1318942)", National Heritage List for England
- Historic England, "Nos. 14 and 16 Horse Market, Kirkby Lonsdale (1145778)", National Heritage List for England
- Historic England, "No. 35 Main Street, Kirkby Lonsdale (1146463)", National Heritage List for England
- Historic England, "No. 37 Main Street, Kirkby Lonsdale (1318949)", National Heritage List for England
- Historic England, "Nos. 47 and 49 Main Street, Kirkby Lonsdale (1318950)", National Heritage List for England
- Historic England, "No. 51 Main Street, Kirkby Lonsdale (1146491)", National Heritage List for England
- Historic England, "No. 67 Main Street, Kirkby Lonsdale (1145754)", National Heritage List for England
- Historic England, "No. 3 Mill Brow, Kirkby Lonsdale (1311683)", National Heritage List for England
- Historic England, "No. 2 Michelgate, Kirkby Lonsdale (1158008)", National Heritage List for England
- Historic England, "No. 4 Michelgate, Kirkby Lonsdale (1145768)", National Heritage List for England
- Historic England, "Nos. 6 and 8 Michelgate, Kirkby Lonsdale (1145769)", National Heritage List for England
- Historic England, "No. 10 Michelgate, Kirkby Lonsdale (1158021)", National Heritage List for England
- Historic England, "No. 14 Michelgate, Kirkby Lonsdale (1145770)", National Heritage List for England
- Historic England, "No. 16 Michelgate, Kirkby Lonsdale (1158041)", National Heritage List for England
- Historic England, "Biggins Cottage and attached outbuilding, Kirkby Lonsdale (1145803)", National Heritage List for England
- Historic England, "Cherkeby Cottages, Kirkby Lonsdale (1138141)", National Heritage List for England
- Historic England, "Gazebo in Churchyard to north of Church of St Mary, Kirkby Lonsdale (1145739)", National Heritage List for England
- Historic England, "Milestone immediately south-east of Town End House, Kirkby Lonsdale (1145789)", National Heritage List for England
- Historic England, "Rose Tree Cottage, Kirkby Lonsdale (1138306)", National Heritage List for England
- Historic England, "The Courtyard, Kirkby Lonsdale (1138174)", National Heritage List for England
- Historic England, "Mill Brow House, Kirkby Lonsdale (1145767)", National Heritage List for England
- Historic England, "Monument to Edward Theobalds in the churchyard west of the Church of St Mary, Kirkby Lonsdale (1158166)", National Heritage List for England
- Historic England, "Library, Kirkby Lonsdale (1138114)", National Heritage List for England
- Historic England, "Monument entitled Obelisk, in the churchyard to the west of the Church of St Mary, Kirkby Lonsdale (1318956)", National Heritage List for England
- Historic England, "Nos. 1, 3, 5, 7, 9, 13 and 15 Market Square, Kirkby Lonsdale (1145756)", National Heritage List for England
- Historic England, "Abbeyfield Lodge, Kirkby Lonsdale (1145811)", National Heritage List for England
- Historic England, "The Gables, Kirkby Lonsdale (1318930)", National Heritage List for England
- Historic England, "No. 5 Beck Head, Kirkby Lonsdale (1145798)", National Heritage List for England
- Historic England, "No. 11 Fairbank, Kirkby Lonsdale (1138186)", National Heritage List for England
- Historic England, "No. 13 Fairbank, Kirkby Lonsdale (1145809)", National Heritage List for England
- Historic England, "No. 15 Fairbank, Kirkby Lonsdale (1138195)", National Heritage List for England
- Historic England, "No. 10 Main Street, Kirkby Lonsdale (1311895)", National Heritage List for England
- Historic England, "Nos. 11 and 13 Main Street, Kirkby Lonsdale (1145790)", National Heritage List for England
- Historic England, "Nos. 17 and 19 Main Street, Kirkby Lonsdale (1146433)", National Heritage List for England
- Historic England, "Nos. 20 and 22 Main Street, Kirkby Lonsdale (1145785)", National Heritage List for England
- Historic England, "Nos. 21 and 23 Main Street, Kirkby Lonsdale (1145791)", National Heritage List for England
- Historic England, "No. 32 Main Street and No. 1 New Street, Kirkby Lonsdale (1145772)", National Heritage List for England
- Historic England, "No. 39 Main Street, Kirkby Lonsdale (1146469)", National Heritage List for England
- Historic England, "Nos. 48, 50 and 52 Main Street, Kirkby Lonsdale (1145787)", National Heritage List for England
- Historic England, "No. 58 Main Street, Kirkby Lonsdale (1145788)", National Heritage List for England
- Historic England, "No. 62 Main Street, the cottage behind No. 62, and Nos. 64 and 66, Kirkby Lonsdale (1311821)", National Heritage List for England
- Historic England, "No. 2 Market Square, Kirkby Lonsdale (1318968)", National Heritage List for England
- Historic England, "No. 1 Market Street, Kirkby Lonsdale (1318969)", National Heritage List for England
- Historic England, "Nos. 10 and 12 Market Street and outbuildings backing onto churchyard, Kirkby Lonsdale (1318936)", National Heritage List for England
- Historic England, "No. 11 Market Street, Kirkby Lonsdale (1157884)", National Heritage List for England
- Historic England, "Nos. 19 and 21 Mitchelgate, Kirkby Lonsdale (1158051)", National Heritage List for England
- Historic England, "No. 31 Mitchelgate, Kirkby Lonsdale (1318938)", National Heritage List for England
- Historic England, "Nos. 3, 5, 7, 9 and 11 New Road, Kirkby Lonsdale (1158086)", National Heritage List for England
- Historic England, "No. 13 New Road, Kirkby Lonsdale (1318939)", National Heritage List for England
- Historic England, "No. 12 Queen's Square, Kirkby Lonsdale (1158103)", National Heritage List for England
- Historic England, "Biggins House, Kirkby Lonsdale (1145804)", National Heritage List for England
- Historic England, "Biggins Lodge farmhouse with barn attached at rear, Kirkby Lonsdale (1145802)", National Heritage List for England
- Historic England, "Church Brow Cottage, Kirkby Lonsdale (1311544)", National Heritage List for England
- Historic England, "Ivy Cottage and Keeper's Cottage, Kirkby Lonsdale (1145779)", National Heritage List for England
- Historic England, "Spital farmhouse, Kirkby Lonsdale (1318946)", National Heritage List for England
- Historic England, "Tearnside Cottage and attached barn, Kirkby Lonsdale (1138314)", National Heritage List for England
- Historic England, "Gatepiers at Underley Lodge, Kirkby Lonsdale (1158258)", National Heritage List for England
- Historic England, "Kearstwick Cottages, Kirkby Lonsdale (1138300)", National Heritage List for England
- Historic England, "Underley Hall School, Kirkby Lonsdale (1311597)", National Heritage List for England
- Historic England, "Jingling End, Kirkby Lonsdale (1318943)", National Heritage List for England
- Historic England, "Nos. 17 and 19 Fairbank, Kirkby Lonsdale (1145810)", National Heritage List for England
- Historic England, "Nos. 5 and 7 Queen's Square, Kirkby Lonsdale (1145773)", National Heritage List for England
- Historic England, "Biggins Hall farmhouse, Kirkby Lonsdale (1138063)", National Heritage List for England
- Historic England, "Hawes Cottage, Kirkby Lonsdale (1311609)", National Heritage List for England
- Historic England, "Schoolroom at Queen Elizabeth Grammar School, Kirkby Lonsdale (1318927)", National Heritage List for England
- Historic England, "Trustee Savings Bank, Kirkby Lonsdale (1145757)", National Heritage List for England
- Historic England, "No. 1 Beck Head, Kirkby Lonsdale (1318951)", National Heritage List for England
- Historic England, "Nos. 8 and 12 Fairbank, Kirkby Lonsdale (1138219)", National Heritage List for England
- Historic England, "Nos. 14 and 16 Fairbank, Kirkby Lonsdale (1145812)", National Heritage List for England
- Historic England, "No. 18 Fairbank and smithy, Kirkby Lonsdale (1138258)", National Heritage List for England
- Historic England, "No. 25 Main Street, Kirkby Lonsdale (1311805)", National Heritage List for England
- Historic England, "No. 45 Main Street, Kirkby Lonsdale (1146476)", National Heritage List for England
- Historic England, "No. 57 Main Street, Kirkby Lonsdale (1146494)", National Heritage List for England
- Historic England, "No. 69 Main Street and adjoining range along Mill Brow, Kirkby Lonsdale (1318966)", National Heritage List for England
- Historic England, "No. 2 Market Street, Kirkby Lonsdale (1145760)", National Heritage List for England
- Historic England, "No. 13 and 15 Market Street, Kirkby Lonsdale (1318970)", National Heritage List for England
- Historic England, "No. 14 Market Street, Kirkby Lonsdale (1157950)", National Heritage List for England
- Historic England, "Nos. 16 and 18 Market Street and outbuildings along east side of yard and backing onto churchyard, Kirkby Lonsdale (1145762)", National Heritage List for England
- Historic England, "No. 20 Market Street, Kirkby Lonsdale (1157959)", National Heritage List for England
- Historic England, "No. 4 Mill Brow, Kirkby Lonsdale (1145763)", National Heritage List for England
- Historic England, "No. 6 Mill Brow, Kirkby Lonsdale (1311708)", National Heritage List for England
- Historic England, "No. 10 Mill Brow, Kirkby Lonsdale (1311713)", National Heritage List for England
- Historic England, "Laundry Cottage, Kirkby Lonsdale (1138095)", National Heritage List for England
- Historic England, "Milestone approximately 650 yards north-west of Tearnside Hall, Kirkby Lonsdale (1138325)", National Heritage List for England
- Historic England, "Underley Home Farm Farmyard (front range), Kirkby Lonsdale (1145734)", National Heritage List for England
- Historic England, "Former Weigh-house, Kirkby Lonsdale (1157985)", National Heritage List for England
- Historic England, "Market House, Kirkby Lonsdale (1311751)", National Heritage List for England
- Historic England, "National Westminster Bank, Kirkby Lonsdale (1145795)", National Heritage List for England
- Historic England, "Kearstwick Lodge, Kirkby Lonsdale (1145780)", National Heritage List for England
- Historic England, "Dutch Barn (approximately 100 metres north-east of Home Farm farmhouse), Kirkby Lonsdale (1158193)", National Heritage List for England
- Historic England, "Dutch Barn (approximately 50 metres south-west of Home Farm farmhouse), Kirkby Lonsdale (1318957)", National Heritage List for England
- Historic England, "High Moorgate, Kirkby Lonsdale (1311914)", National Heritage List for England
- Historic England, "Low Moorgate, Kirkby Lonsdale (1318945)", National Heritage List for England
- Historic England, "Stables to south-east at The Gables, Kirkby Lonsdale (1138200)", National Heritage List for England
- Historic England, "Home Farm cottage, Kirkby Lonsdale (1158213)", National Heritage List for England
- Historic England, "Game larder adjacent to Home Farm cottage, Kirkby Lonsdale (1145736)", National Heritage List for England
- Historic England, "Home Farm farmhouse, attached game larder and coach-house, Kirkby Lonsdale (1145735)", National Heritage List for England
- Historic England, "Underley Bridge, Kirkby Lonsdale (1086923)", National Heritage List for England
- Historic England, "Underley Lodge, Kirkby Lonsdale (1145737)", National Heritage List for England
- Historic England, "Home Farm stable (approximately 75 metres north-east of Home Farm cottage), Kirkby Lonsdale (1311590)", National Heritage List for England
- Historic England, "Kearstwick Institute, Kirkby Lonsdale (1318944)", National Heritage List for England
- Historic England, "Market Cross, Kirkby Lonsdale (1145758)", National Heritage List for England
- Historic England, "Churchyard Gates, Kirkby Lonsdale (1145807)", National Heritage List for England
- Historic England, "Cross Cottage, Kirkby Lonsdale (1145764)", National Heritage List for England
- Historic England, "Monument to Dorothy Cartwright in the churchyard to east of Church of St Mary, Kirkby Lonsdale (1145731)", National Heritage List for England
- Historic England, Listed Buildings
- Hyde, Matthew; Pevsner, Nikolaus (2010) [1967], Cumbria, The Buildings of England, New Haven and London: Yale University Press, ISBN 978-0-300-12663-1
