= Firbank =

Village in Cumbria, England

Coordinates: 54.342°N 2.578°W

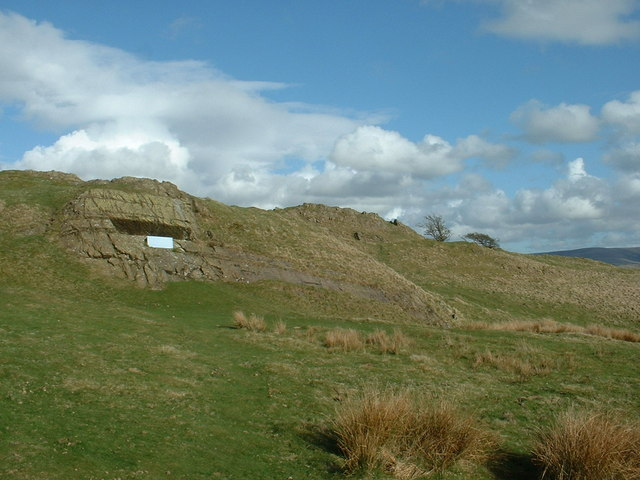
- Fox's Pulpit

- Location within Cumbria
- Population: 97 (2001)
- OS grid reference: SD6293
- Civil parish: Firbank
- Unitary authority: Westmorland and Furness
- Ceremonial county: Cumbria
- Region: North West
- Country: England
- Sovereign state: United Kingdom
- Post town: SEDBERGH
- Postcode district: LA10
- Dialling code: 01539
- Police: Cumbria
- Fire: Cumbria
- Ambulance: North West
- UK Parliament: Westmorland and Lonsdale

Firbank is a village and civil parish in the Westmorland and Furness district of the English county of Cumbria. It has a population of 97. As Firbank had a population of less than 100 at the 2011 Census, details are included in the parish of Killington. In 1652, George Fox preached to about 1,000 people at Fox's Pulpit, at one of the meetings which brought about the Quaker movement.

The poet Catherine Grace Godwin is buried at St John the Evangelist Church.

== See also ==
- Listed buildings in Firbank
