= St Mary's Church, Kirkby Lonsdale =

Coordinates: 54.2037°N 2.5975°W

St Mary's Church
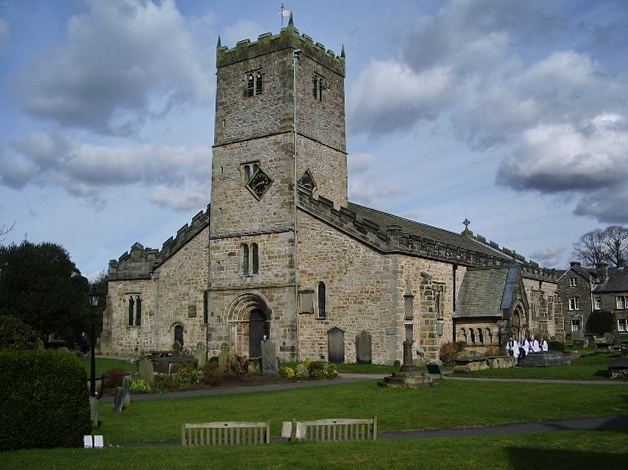
- St Mary's Church from the southwest

- Location in South Lakeland Location in Cumbria
- OS grid reference: SD 611 788
- Location: Kirkby Lonsdale, Cumbria
- Country: England
- Denomination: Anglican
- Website: St Mary, Kirkby Lonsdale

History
- Status: Parish church

Architecture
- Functional status: Active
- Heritage designation: Grade I
- Designated: 12 February 1962
- Architect(s): Francis Webster; E. G. Paley (restorations)
- Architectural type: Church
- Style: Norman, Gothic

Specifications
- Materials: Stone, slate roofs

Administration
- Province: York
- Diocese: Carlisle
- Archdeaconry: Westmorland and Furness
- Deanery: Kendal
- Parish: Kirkby Lonsdale

Clergy
- Vicar: Revd Richard John Snow

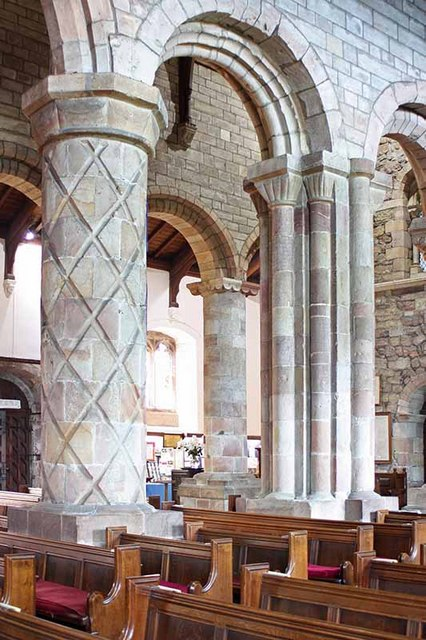
Norman column in the north arcade

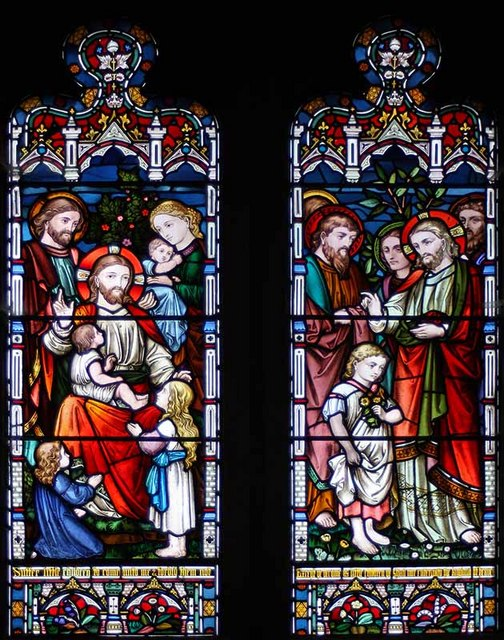
Stained glass window

St Mary's Church is in the town of Kirkby Lonsdale, Cumbria, England. It is an active Anglican parish church in the deanery of Kendal, the archdeaconry of Westmorland and Furness, and the diocese of Carlisle. Its benefice is united with those of six local churches to form the Kirkby Lonsdale Team Ministry. The church contains Norman architecture and is recorded in the National Heritage List for England as a designated Grade I listed building.

== History ==
The oldest parts of the church are Norman. Three doorways and the inner north arcades date from the early 12th century, and the base of the tower and the south arcade are from the later part of that century. In the 14th century (or possibly about 1400) the north and south walls of the church were demolished and were rebuilt further outwards, the new south wall incorporating the earlier south doorway. A chantry chapel was added to the northeast of the church in 1486. In the 16th century a new clerestory, pinnacles and battlements were added, and in 1574 an additional aisle was built further north of the existing north aisle. The top of the tower was rebuilt in 1705, and the chantry chapel was demolished at that time. In 1807 the clerestory, battlements and pinnacles were removed by Francis Webster, who added an overall roof. The church was restored in 1866 by E. G. Paley. He raised the roof, giving the outer north aisle a separate roof, reseated the church, re-floored the chancel, added a south porch and installed a screen and a font.

== Architecture ==
=== Exterior ===
St Mary's is constructed in stone with slate roofs. It is a wide church with a rectangular plan, apart from the south porch. It has a nave and a chancel, one south and two north aisles, a south porch and a west tower embraced by the aisles. There are three Norman doorways, one at the base of the tower, the other two on the south side of the church.

The tower is in four stages; the parapets of the tower and the body of the church are embattled. The top stages of the tower are perpendicular. The tower features an oddly-placed clock, which notably wrecks the symmetry of the tower, and is presumed to be a 19th-century addition.

The 19th-century south porch is in Neo-Norman style. The windows along the side of the church are square-headed and contain differing numbers of lights. The east window consists of three lancets with a vesica above.

=== Interior ===
The west part of the arcade between the nave and the inner north aisle is early Norman with round arches; some of its piers have incised decoration similar to that on the piers in Durham Cathedral. The south arcade is later and simpler. To the east ends of the arcades, the arches are pointed. The easternmost pier of the south arcade contains a piscina. The outer north arcade is in Perpendicular style. The pulpit is dated 1619, but has been reduced in size since. The font has been moved from a 14th-century chapel at Killington and is set on a 19th-century base. The reredos is in alabaster with mosaic decoration. Most of the stained glass is by Lavers, Barraud and Westlake, but there are also windows by Heaton, Butler and Bayne (designed by Henry Holiday), by Shrigley and Hunt and by William Wailes. The oldest monument is a tomb chest with an alabaster effigy dating from the 15th century. The two-manual pipe organ was built in the 1860s by Forster and Andrews and rebuilt and enlarged in 1925 by Jardine and Company. It was extensively rebuilt in 1972 by Laycock and Bannister. There is a ring of six bells, all cast in 1825 by Thomas Mears II of the Whitechapel Bell Foundry.

== External features ==
In the churchyard are ten monuments that have been listed at Grade II. To the east of the church is a monument to the Burrow family, dating from the middle of the 18th century. To the south of this is a table tomb from the early 18th century. Also to the east of the church is a monument to John Dent dated 1709, and a table tomb to Rowland Tarham dated 1716. To the south of the church is a monument to two members of the Preston family, the table tomb dated 1775 of Thomas Newby, and a table tomb to members of the Turner family dated in the 1790s. To the west of the church is the table tomb of Thomas Tiffin dated 1787, and a table tomb dated 1818 to Edward Theobalds. Also to the west of the church is a memorial to five women who died in a fire in the Rose and Crown Inn in 1820. To the north of the church is a gazebo, which was formerly in the garden of the vicarage. It is a two-storey octagonal stone structure with round-headed doors and windows, but has lost its former roof.

== See also ==
- Grade I listed churches in Cumbria
- Grade I listed buildings in Cumbria
- Listed buildings in Kirkby Lonsdale
- List of ecclesiastical works by E. G. Paley
