= Docker, Cumbria =

Coordinates: 54.354°N 2.667°W

Docker
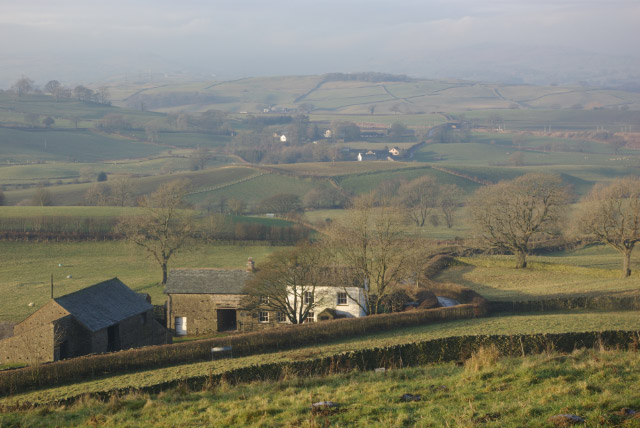
- Haygarth

- Location within Cumbria
- Population: 299 (2024, including Lambrigg)
- OS grid reference: SD5695
- Civil parish: Docker
- Unitary authority: Westmorland and Furness
- Ceremonial county: Cumbria
- Region: North West
- Country: England
- Sovereign state: United Kingdom
- Post town: KENDAL
- Postcode district: LA8
- Dialling code: 01539
- Police: Cumbria
- Fire: Cumbria
- Ambulance: North West
- UK Parliament: Westmorland and Lonsdale

Docker is a civil parish in the Westmorland and Furness district of the English county of Cumbria. Docker is 4.3 miles north east of the market town of Kendal. At the 2011 census Docker was grouped with Lambrigg giving a total population of 260.

In 1870–1872, John Marius Wilson from the Imperial Gazetteer of England and Wales described Docker as: "a township in Kendal parish, Westmoreland; near the river Mint and the Lancaster and Carlisle railway 3 miles ENE of Kendal"

== Toponymy ==
Diana Whalley's A Dictionary of Lake District Place-Names (English Place Name Society 2006) has this name either as meaning "the shieling at the hollow" or "the shieling where the plant called dock grows" (from Old Norse erg = "summer pasture", taken from Irish airge), or as a personal name which "may have been a link with the family traced in Parker 1918" (Parker C.A. A pedigree of the family of Docker. CW2 18, 161–73). Whalley also refers to "the same problematic syllable in Dockray and ... Dockray Nook" (NY3921 & NY0820).

== Demography ==
=== Population statistics ===
The population in 2001 was 55. In the in 2011 census the parish was grouped with Lambrigg, the total population more than quadrupled. The population fluctuations in Docker can be seen in the graph showing the census data every 10 years since 1801. There was no census taken in 1941. This is most likely to have been down to a change in the boundaries of the Parish. It may have been thought having a parish with a population of 55 was not significant enough and as a result the council may have changed the boundaries to even out the distribution.

The male population for Docker and Lambrigg was slightly higher than the female population according to 2024 estimates. There was 157 males to 142 females.

The number of people aged 16 and over with 5 or more GCSEs grade A–C (or equivalent) was 10.63%, 4.67% lower than the national average.

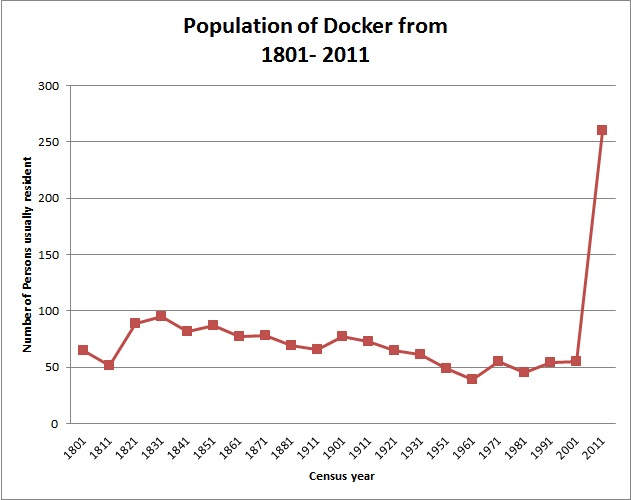
Population of Docker from 1801 to 2011

=== Occupational statistics ===
In 2011 there were 161 residents in the two parishes that were between the ages of 16 and 74 and in employment. The occupations of the people usually resident at the time of the 2011 census between the ages of 16 and 74 are shown in the pie chart for 2011. The largest population percentage is Professional Occupations category with 23%. The percentage of Skilled Trades Occupations is well above the average for England of 11.4% compared to 17.4% in Docker. Docker is in the countryside so this is due to the thriving agricultural industry in the area. As a result, higher qualifications may be unnecessary for the industry in Docker.

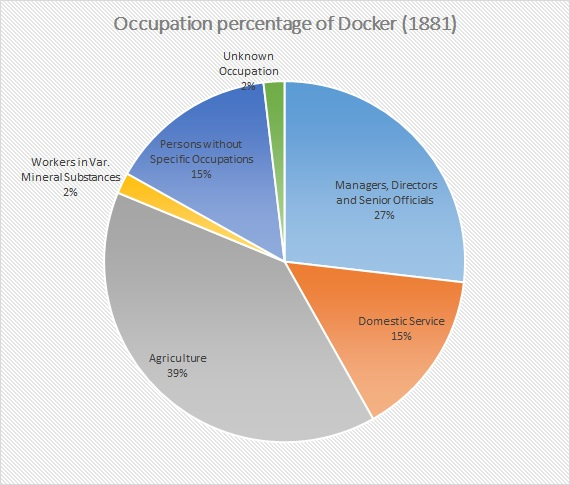
Graph of Occupations for Docker as of the 1881 census

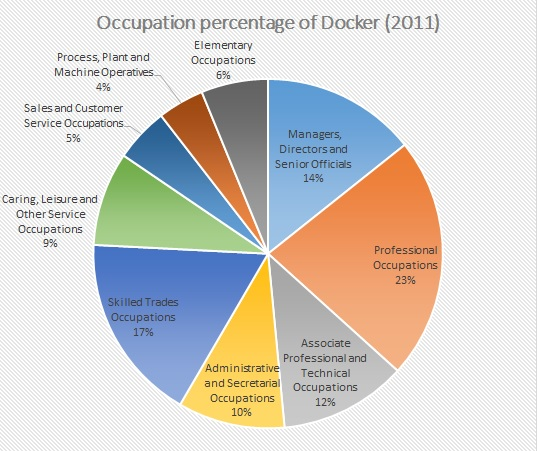
Occupational graph For Docker 2011

== Transport ==
=== Roads ===
The A65 road runs through Docker, connecting the A6 and the M6. The A65 runs North West from Leeds in Yorkshire through Ilkley and Skipton before terminating at Kendal in Cumbria.

The M6 Motorway runs from east of Docker from Rugby via Stoke-on-trent, Liverpool and Manchester terminating at Gretna Junction.

=== Railway line ===
The nearest railway station to Docker is Kendal station which is 4.7 miles away. The TransPennine Express runs through Kendal from Windermere to Oxenholme. Although Docker does not have its own railway station, the West Coast Mainline runs through Docker from London Euston to Glasgow. The line runs along the Docker viaduct.

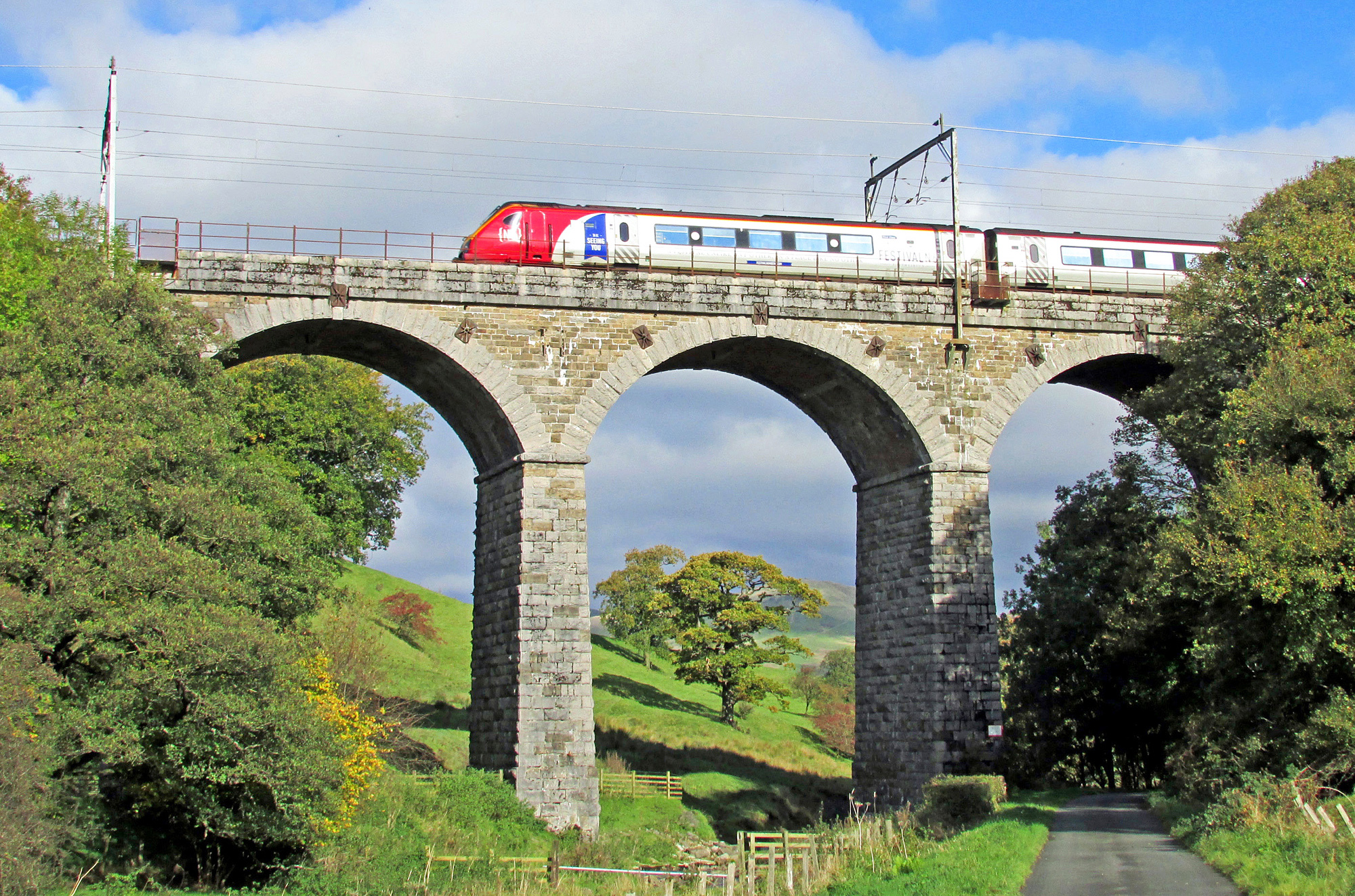
The Docker Viaduct on the West Coast Main Line

On 24 February 2007 the 17:15 Virgin train travelling from London Euston to Glasgow Central was derailed 2 miles from Docker near the village of Grayrigg. Several carriages were turned on their side. Cumbria Ambulance service were alerted to the crash at 8.16 pm near Little Docker Cottage. An inquiry found the "immediate cause" of the Grayrigg derailment was a "degraded and unsafe" set of points known as Lambrigg 2B. The train was reported to have lurched side to side in "a very dramatic way"; the train then careered down an embankment, killing 84-year-old Margaret Masson and injuring 22 others. As the rear of the train was crossing the Docker Viaduct, the front of the train was derailed, just beyond the bridge. Thermal imagery equipment was used to detect any trapped survivors. Following the crash, the points that caused the derailment were removed and the line is now welded continuously including the segment on the Docker Viaduct.

== Local amenities ==
The closest primary school to Docker is the Grayrigg Church of England school, 1.5 miles to the north west. The nearest secondary school is the Queen Katherine School in Kendal, a coeducational academy for 11- to 16-year-olds, 3.1 miles away.

The nearest hospital is Westmorland General Hospital, 6.3 km away on Burton Road in Kendal.

The nearest major shopping area to Docker is the Westmoreland Shopping Centre in Kendal, 4.7 miles south west.
