= Lambrigg =

Civil parish in Cumbria, England

Coordinates: 54.353°N 2.626°W

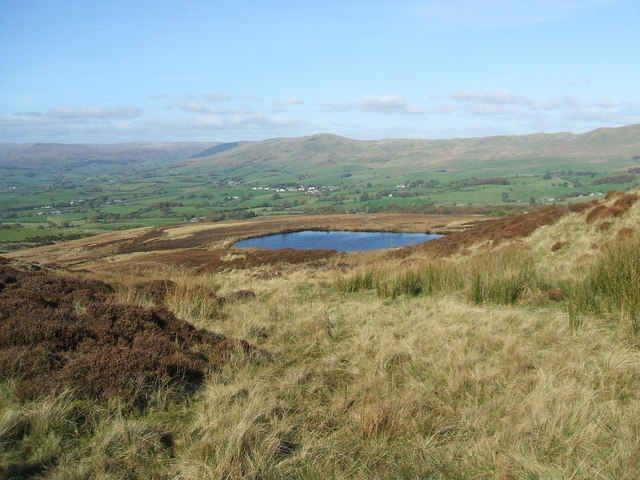
- Reservoir on Lambrigg Fell

- Location within Cumbria
- Population: 90 (2001)
- OS grid reference: SY5995
- Civil parish: Lambrigg
- Unitary authority: Westmorland and Furness
- Ceremonial county: Cumbria
- Region: North West
- Country: England
- Sovereign state: United Kingdom
- Post town: KENDAL
- Postcode district: LA8
- Dialling code: 01539
- Police: Cumbria
- Fire: Cumbria
- Ambulance: North West
- UK Parliament: Westmorland and Lonsdale

Lambrigg is a civil parish in the Westmorland and Furness district of the English county of Cumbria. It includes the hamlets of Cross Houses and Lambrigg Head, and the hill of Lambrigg Fell. The parish has a population of 90. As the population taken at the 2011 Census was less than 100, data was included with the parish of Docker.

== See also ==
- Listed buildings in Lambrigg
