= Listed buildings in Lambrigg =

Lambrigg is a civil parish in Westmorland and Furness, Cumbria, England. It contains three listed buildings that are recorded in the National Heritage List for England. All the listed buildings are designated at Grade II, the lowest of the three grades, which is applied to "buildings of national importance and special interest". The parish is almost entirely rural, and the listed buildings consist of two houses and a railway viaduct.

== Buildings ==
Name and location	Photograph	Date	Notes
Bracken Hall; 54.35845°N 2.66060°W	—	Early to mid 18th century (probable)	A roughcast stone house with a slate roof. It has two storeys with an attic, an east front of four bays, and a rear outshut. On the front is a gabled porch with a segmental arched opening. Most of the windows are cross-mullioned, with hood moulds over the ground floor windows.
Bracken Hall Cottage; 54.35832°N 2.66063°W	—	18th century (probable)	A roughcast stone house with a slate roof. two storeys, an east front of two bays, the right bay originally a stable, and a rear lean-to outshut. On the front is a gabled porch with a segmental arched opening, and the windows are varied.
Docker Viaduct; 54.35523°N 2.66857°W		1846	The viaduct was built to carry the Lancaster and Carlisle Railway (now the West Coast Main Line) over the valley of Flodder Beck. It was designed by Joseph Locke, and is in limestone with some brick. It consists of six segmental arches on tapering piers with impost bands, and has projecting parapets with iron railings.
