= John Edward Errington =

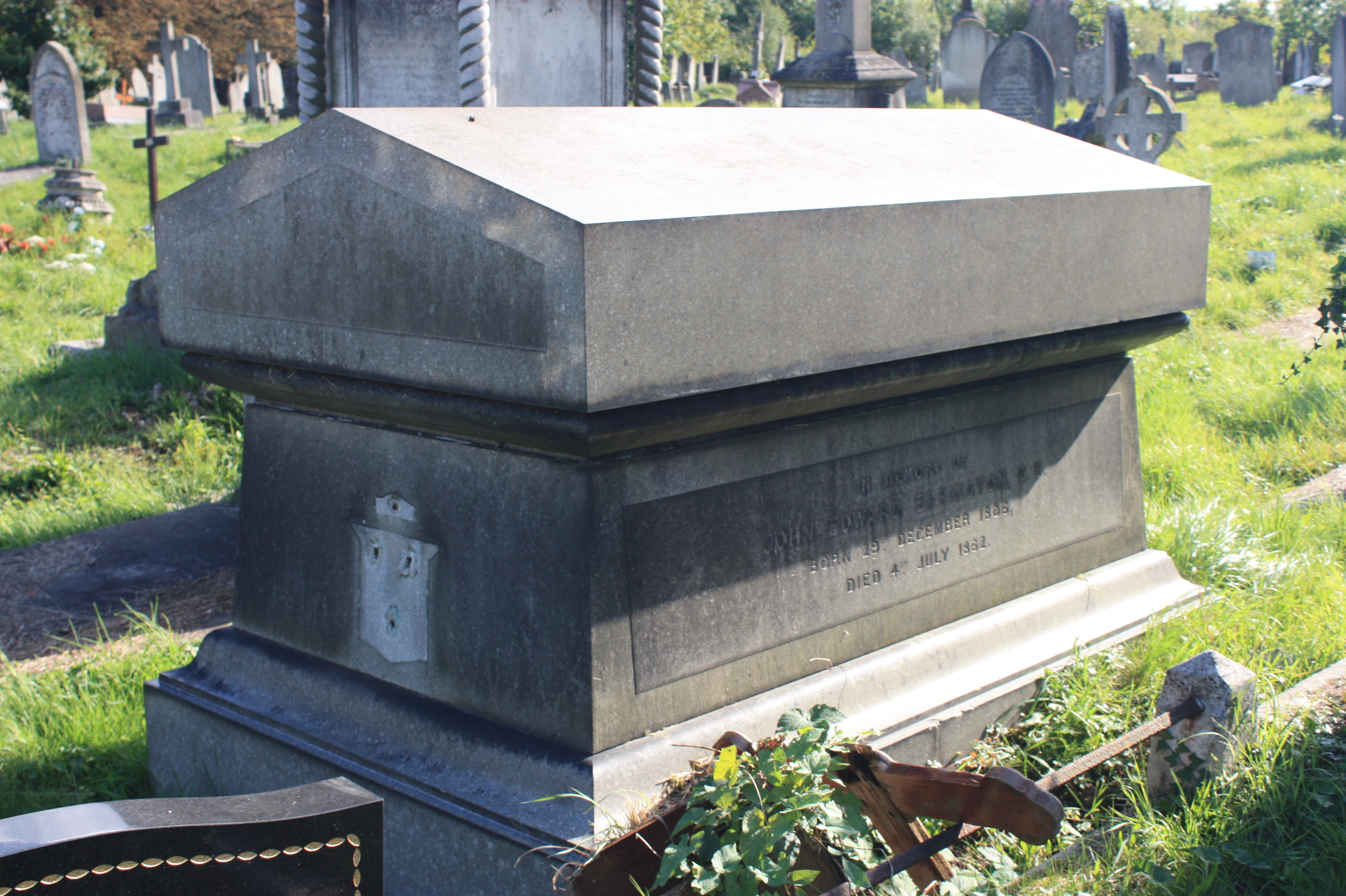
The grave of John Edward Errington, Kensal Green Cemetery

John Edward Errington (29 December 1806 – 4 July 1862) was an English civil engineer, particularly noted for his work on railway construction in the United Kingdom.

== Biography ==
Errington, eldest son of Captain John Errington and Harriet – of the gentry branch of Walwick Grange, Northumberland -, was born at Hull on 29 December 1804. At an early age he was placed with an engineer officer then conducting extensive public works in Ireland. After a time he became assistant to Mr. Padley in the surveys which he made in the early stages of railways in England. This employment brought him into connection with Mr. Rastick, C.E., by whom he was engaged to help in the preparation of the plans for the Birmingham end of the Grand Junction Railway. At this period he first met Joseph Locke.

When the Grand Junction railway came under the sole direction of Locke, he gave Errington an appointment as resident engineer, and entrusted to him the superintendence of the construction of a portion of the line. After the completion of that railway in 1837, he took charge of the line from Glasgow by Paisley to Greenock, and in 1841 laid out and constructed the harbour works of the latter seaport. In 1843, in conjunction with Locke, he made the plans for the Lancaster and Carlisle Railway, the works on which were carried out under his sole charge.

He also constructed the Caledonian Railway, 1848, the Clydesdale Junction Railway, the Scottish Central Railway, the Scottish Midland Junction Railway, and the Aberdeen Railway; and he either brought forward or was consulted about the entire system of railways from Lancaster to Inverness.

After the commencement of the larger works in Scotland he removed to London, and devoted his attention to the various additions and branches made to the railways constructed under his own and Locke's superintendence. He joined the Institution of Civil Engineers as an associate in 1831, and became a member on 22 January 1839; he was a member of the council in 1850, and a vice-president 1861–2, and bequeathed £1,000 to the institution.

During his career he was engaged in various parliamentary contests, when the conscientious and clear manner in which he gave his evidence had always great weight with the committees. He endeavoured to make railways commercially successful, and at the same time to combine elegance with strength and economy of design. His bridges on the Lancaster and Carlisle and the Caledonian railways, and those across the Thames at Richmond, Kew and Kingston, show his success.

Latterly he was appointed engineer to the London and South Western Railway Company, and his plan for the line from Yeovil to Exeter was accepted in 1856. The works were immediately commenced, and after great difficulties, owing to the heavy tunnels at Crewkerne and Honiton, the line was opened in 1860. Several branches of this line were also constructed under his direction.

After the completion of this work his health failed, and he died at his residence, 6 Pall Mall East, London, on 4 July 1862, aged 57, and was buried in Kensal Green Cemetery, south-east of the central chapel, near his friend and associate, Joseph Locke.

== Sources ==
- This article incorporates text from a publication now in the public domain: "Errington, John Edward". Dictionary of National Biography. London: Smith, Elder & Co. 1885–1900.
