= Grayrigg =

Village and civil parish in Cumbria, England

Coordinates: 54.367°N 2.650°W

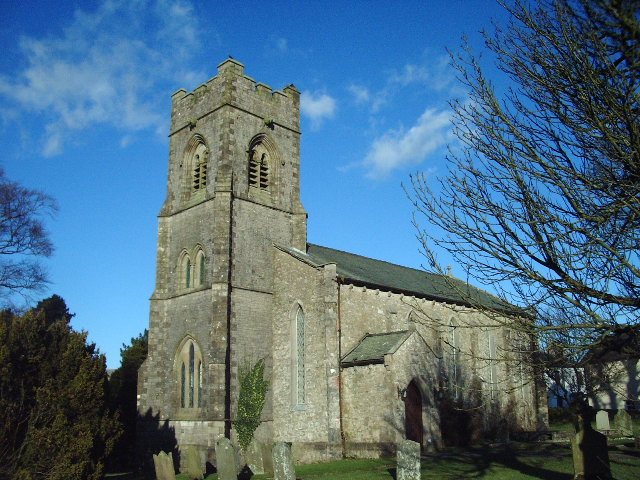
- St John the Evangelist Church

- Location within Cumbria
- Population: 200
- OS grid reference: SD5797
  - London: 224 mi (360 km) SSE
- Civil parish: Grayrigg
- Unitary authority: Westmorland and Furness
- Ceremonial county: Cumbria
- Region: North West
- Country: England
- Sovereign state: United Kingdom
- Post town: KENDAL
- Postcode district: LA8
- Dialling code: 01539
- Police: Cumbria
- Fire: Cumbria
- Ambulance: North West
- UK Parliament: Westmorland and Lonsdale

Grayrigg is a small village and civil parish in the Westmorland and Furness district of Cumbria, England. In the 2001 census the parish had a population of 223, increasing at the 2011 census to 242. It lies on undulated and partly mountainous land, 4.9 miles (8 km) north east of Kendal, on the north side of the West Coast Main Line, and west side of the M6 motorway.

== History ==
Historically a part of Westmorland, Grayrigg and its surrounding area have provided evidence of an ancient Roman camp. During the Middle Ages Grayrigg formed a chapelry and township centred on the chapel dedicated to St John the Evangelist, which is still in use. It also used to have a Quaker meeting house, now known as the Beckhouse which is just outside of Grayrigg. It was originally built in 1696 before being extended in 1713 and it was closed in 1846; but it was reopened in 1871 before closing for the last time in 1952.

== Railway accidents ==
Grayrigg's 20th and 21st century history is marked by two high-profile major train crashes.

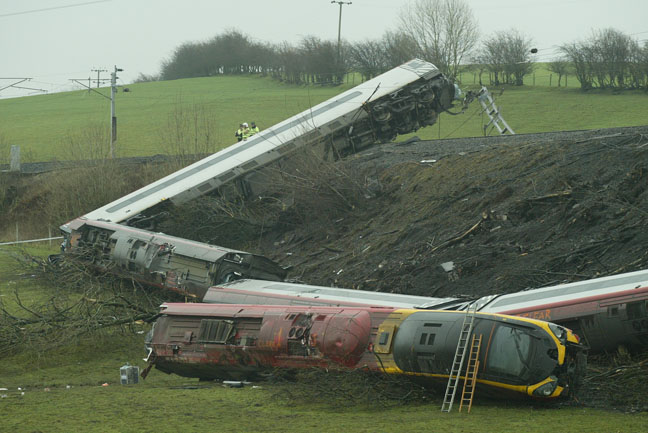
The Grayrigg derailment was a rail accident in 2007, in which a passenger was fatally injured.

On 18 May 1947, a 13-carriage London Midland & Scottish Railway service from Glasgow Central to London Euston failed to stop at the signals for Lambrigg Crossing and collided with a locomotive with 33 people injured, three seriously.

On 23 February 2007, Lambrigg Crossovers (54.358507,-2.655958), south of Grayrigg was the site of the Grayrigg derailment, a fatal derailment involving a Virgin Trains West Coast service from London Euston to Glasgow Central.

== Grayrigg CE Primary School ==
Grayrigg School was opened some time in the 1800s and has been in operation since. As of 2025, it has 67 pupils although it only has a capacity of 56 and is located at Grayrigg, Kendal, Cumbria, LA8 9BU. It has classes ranging from Nursery to Y6 (3-11 Years) and is run by the Headteacher Mrs Kirsty Cooper.

== See also ==
- Listed buildings in Grayrigg
- Grayrigg Forest
