= Kirkby Lonsdale =

Town and civil parish in Cumbria, England

- Town and civil parish
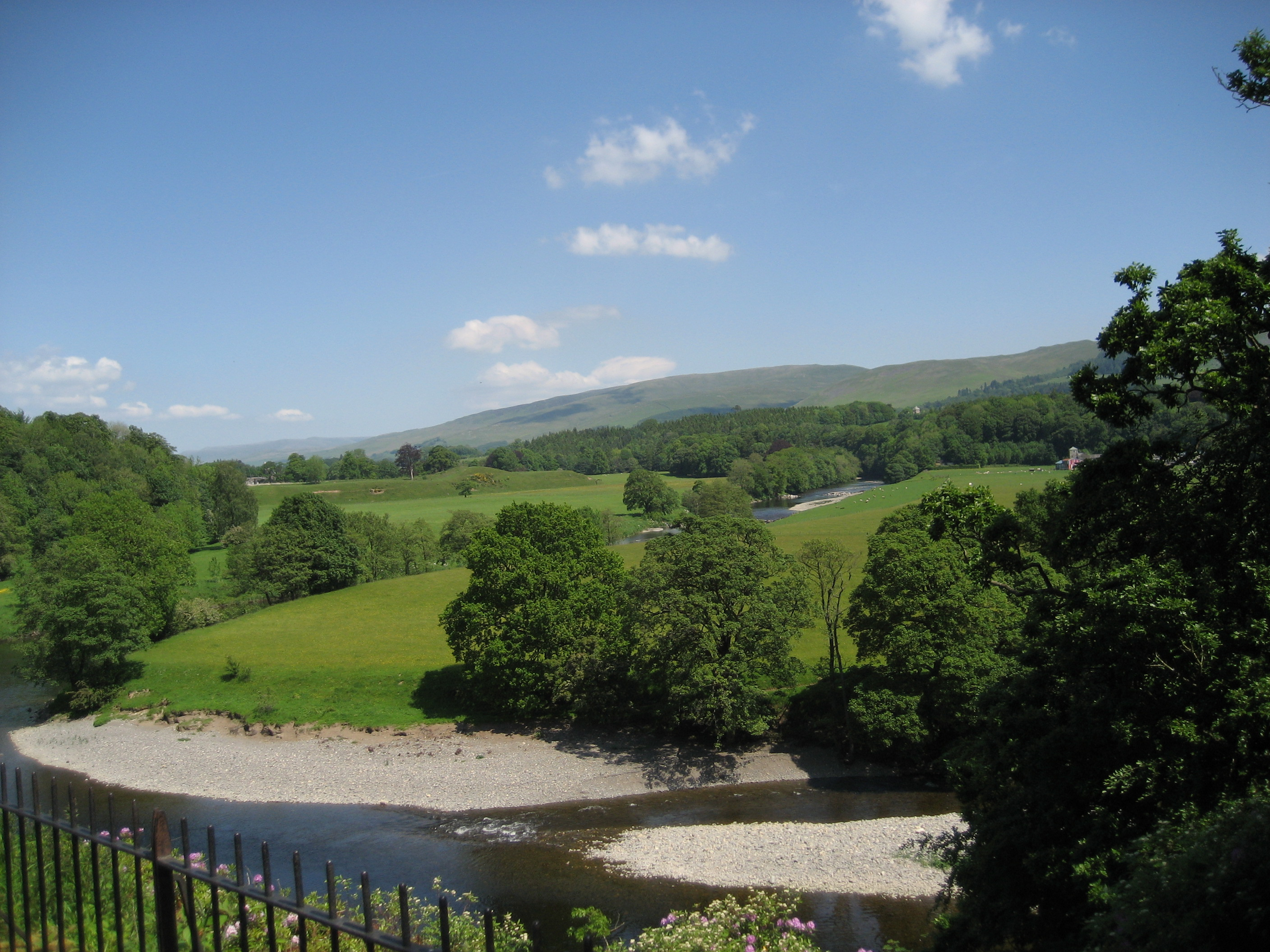
- Ruskin's View

- Location in the former South Lakeland district Location within Cumbria
- Population: 1,843 (2011 Census)
- OS grid reference: SD6178
- Civil parish: Kirkby Lonsdale
- Unitary authority: Westmorland and Furness
- Ceremonial county: Cumbria
- Region: North West
- Country: England
- Sovereign state: United Kingdom
- Post town: CARNFORTH
- Postcode district: LA6
- Dialling code: 015242
- Police: Cumbria
- Fire: Cumbria
- Ambulance: North West
- UK Parliament: Morecambe and Lunesdale

Kirkby Lonsdale (/ˈkɜːrbi ˈlɒnzdeɪl/) is a town and civil parish in the Westmorland and Furness district of Cumbria, England, on the River Lune. Historically in Westmorland, it lies 13 miles (21 km) south-east of Kendal on the A65. The parish recorded a population of 1,771 in the 2001 census, increasing to 1,843 at the 2011 Census.

Notable buildings include St Mary's Church, a Norman building with fine carved columns. The view of the River Lune from the churchyard is known as Ruskin's View after John Ruskin, who called it one of the loveliest in England. It was painted by J. M. W. Turner.

== Governance ==
Kirkby Lonsdale is in the Morecambe and Lunesdale parliamentary constituency; Lizzi Collinge of the Labour Party was elected as its Member of Parliament at the 2024 general election.

In local government the town is within Westmorland and Furness. Until 2023 it was in the Kirkby Lonsdale ward of South Lakeland District Council and the Sedbergh & Kirkby Lonsdale Division of Cumbria County Council. It has a parish council, Kirkby Lonsdale Town Council.

== History ==
=== Early history ===
Early signs of occupation include a Neolithic stone circle on Casterton Fell and remains of Celtic settlements at Barbon, Middleton and Hutton Roof.

During the Roman period, a Roman road followed the River Lune, linking forts at Low Borrow Bridge near Tebay and Over Burrow, south of Kirkby Lonsdale. A Roman milestone unearthed in 1836 and described as "the best in the country" was re-erected on a hill near Hawkin Hall (SD 623 859), close to where it was found.

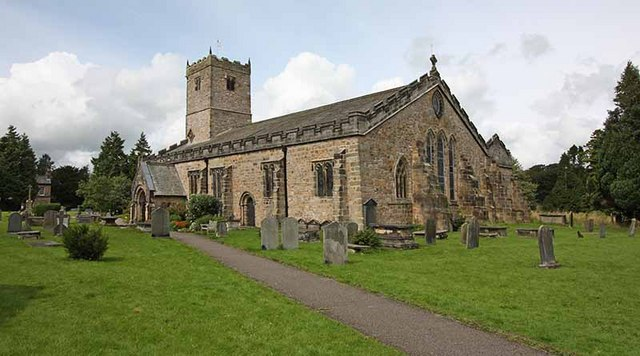
St Mary's Church

Kirkby Lonsdale developed at a crossing over the River Lune, where drovers' and pack-horse routes converged. It is one of few Cumbrian towns mentioned in the 1086 Domesday Book, where it is called Cherchibi (village with a church). An earlier church was rebuilt by the Normans, who erected an artificial mound or motte on nearby glebe land. A wooden tower or keep is thought to have surmounted the stronghold as a base for controlling the surrounding area.

In later years, the mound was used for cockfighting, hence the current name of Cockpit Hill. In 1093, Ivo de Taillebois (Baron of Kendal) granted the church at Kirkby Lonsdale to St Mary's Abbey in York, which held it until the Dissolution of the Monasteries. Thereafter the abbey and its possessions, including St Mary's Church, passed to Trinity College, Cambridge, which retains the patronage to this day.

In 1227, the town gained a market charter and the right to hold an annual fair every September. Each week stallholders gathered in Market Street to sell their wares, as did horse traders in the Horsemarket and pig sellers in Swinemarket. Thursday was as now the scene of great activity. Kirkby has an annual festival called the Victorian Fair.

=== 19th century onward ===
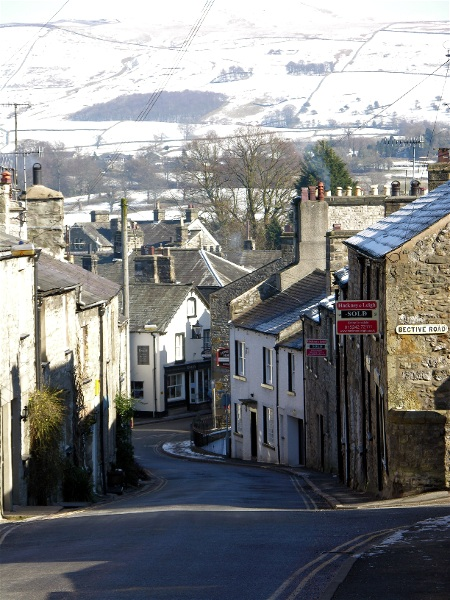
Mitchelgate in Kirkby Lonsdale

The weekly market and daily throughput of drovers and pack-horse carriers created a bustling town, with a total of 29 inns and alehouses, of which eight remain. By the early 19th century, the old market area was becoming too congested and a new market place was built in 1822.

The steep incline of Mill Brow with its fast-flowing, now culverted stream was the industrial heart of Kirkby Lonsdale, with several mills using water power for grinding corn, bark and bone, carding wool, manufacturing snuff, making bobbins and fulling cloth, and sawing timber.

Today Kirkby Lonsdale remains a busy town with a market. The centre has a mixture of elegant 18th-century buildings and stone cottages huddled round cobbled courtyards and narrow alleyways, with names such as Salt Pie Lane and Jingling Lane.

St Mary's Church is an active Anglican parish church in the deanery of Kendal, the archdeaconry of Westmorland and Furness, and the diocese of Carlisle. Its benefice is united with those of six local churches to form the Kirkby Lonsdale Team Ministry. It contains Norman architecture and is recorded in the National Heritage List for England as a designated Grade I listed building.

Kirkby Lonsdale's Queen Elizabeth School on Biggins Road is a secondary school specialising in the performing arts, sports and languages.

A two-day Victorian fair used to be hosted in the town each September. The streets were closed to traffic and filled with traders' stalls, craft demonstrations and entertainment, while visitors were encouraged to wear Victorian dress.

Motorbike enthusiasts meet every Sunday at Devil's Bridge.

== Devil's Bridge ==
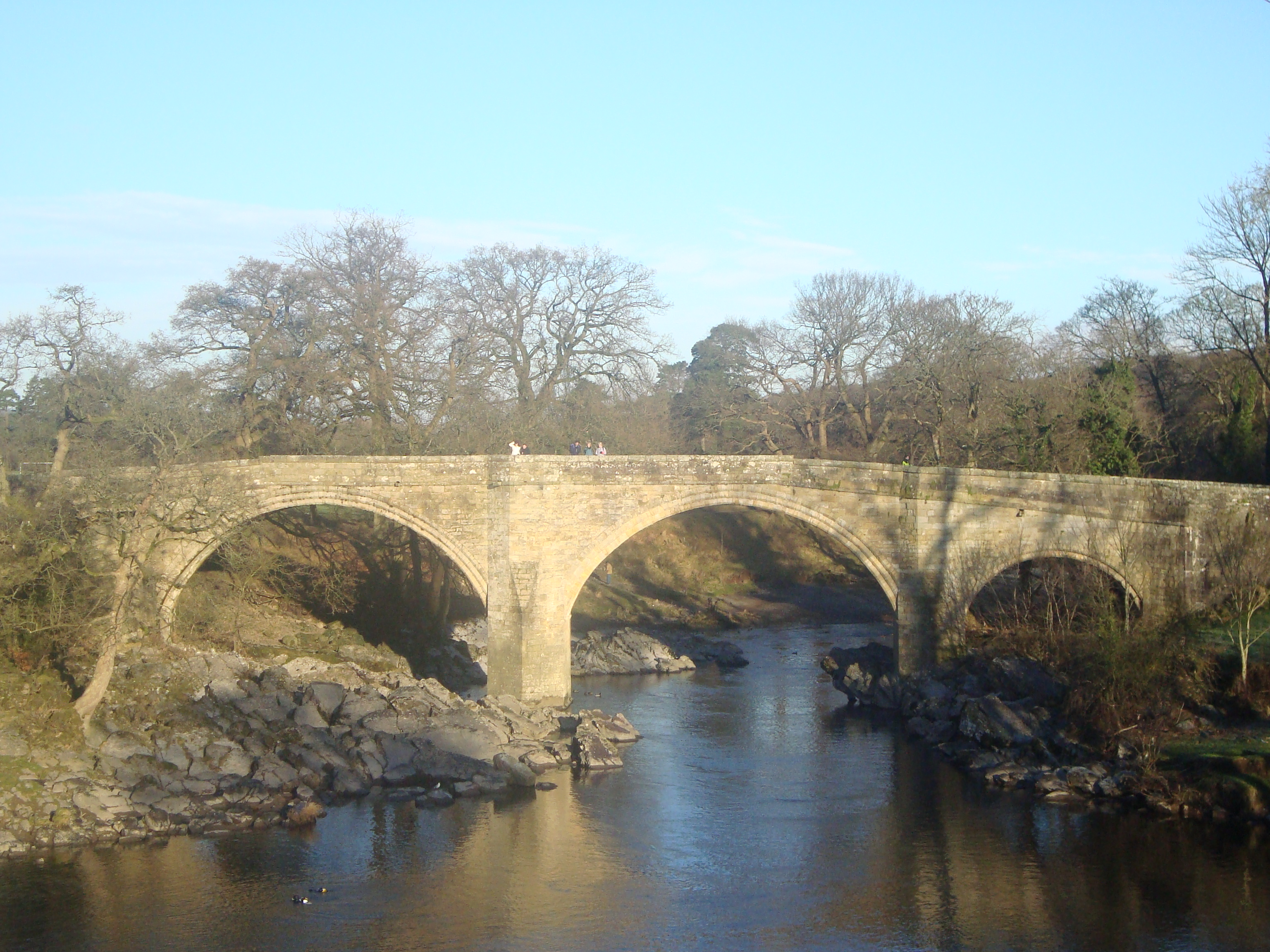
Devil's Bridge over the River Lune in Kirkby Lonsdale

The town is noted for the Devil's Bridge (54.199°N 2.590°W), which at one time carried the Skipton to Kendal road over the River Lune. It dates from around 1370 and is built of fine gritstone ashlar. Of its three spans, the western two measure 54.75 feet (16.69 m) each and the eastern one 29 feet (8.8 m), or 45 feet (14 m) from river to parapet. The piers are hexagonal, 60 feet (18 m) round and extending upwards to provide pedestrian refuges. At the eastern end is a sundial in the form of a square block on an octagonal column. The bridge was probably built by monks of St Mary's Abbey, York.

Like many bridges of the same name, it features a legend that the Devil appeared to an old woman, promising to build a bridge in exchange for the first soul to cross over it. When the bridge was finished, the woman threw bread over the bridge and her dog chased after it, thereby outwitting the Devil. Several large stones in the surrounding area, including the Great Stone of Fourstones, are ascribed to the Devil's purse strings bursting open as he ferried masonry to build it. It was repaired in 1705 and repointed in 1829 using Roman-style cement. The eastern arch was repaired in about 1869.

The roadway on the bridge is only 12 feet (3.7 m) wide, insufficient for modern traffic. As numbers increased the bridge was closed to vehicles in 1932. Traffic instead crosses the river by the Stanley Bridge, 490 feet (150 m) to the south, which was built in the 1930s. Devil's Bridge is a Grade I listed structure and a Scheduled Ancient Monument.

The river beneath Devil's Bridge is popular with scuba divers for its relatively easy access and egress, deep rock pools (about 16 ft in a low swell) and good visibility. The bridge also witnesses illegal "tombstoning" (bridge diving), which has caused at least one death, that of a 22-year-old man in 2012.

== Transport ==
The Keighley and Kendal Turnpike of 1753 passed through Kirkby Lonsdale and met there with a turnpike from Milnthorpe on the coast. In 1818, the two trusts were amalgamated.

Kirkby Lonsdale railway station, 2 miles (3 km) away in Lancashire, opened in 1861 and closed to passengers in 1954. There is no longer a railway station. Kirkby Lonsdale Coach Hire and Stagecoach Cumbria provide bus services.

== See also ==
- Listed buildings in Kirkby Lonsdale
- Lonsdale, South Australia, named after Kirkby Lonsdale
