= Todd Lane Junction railway station =

Former railway station in England

Coordinates: 53.7323°N 2.6821°W

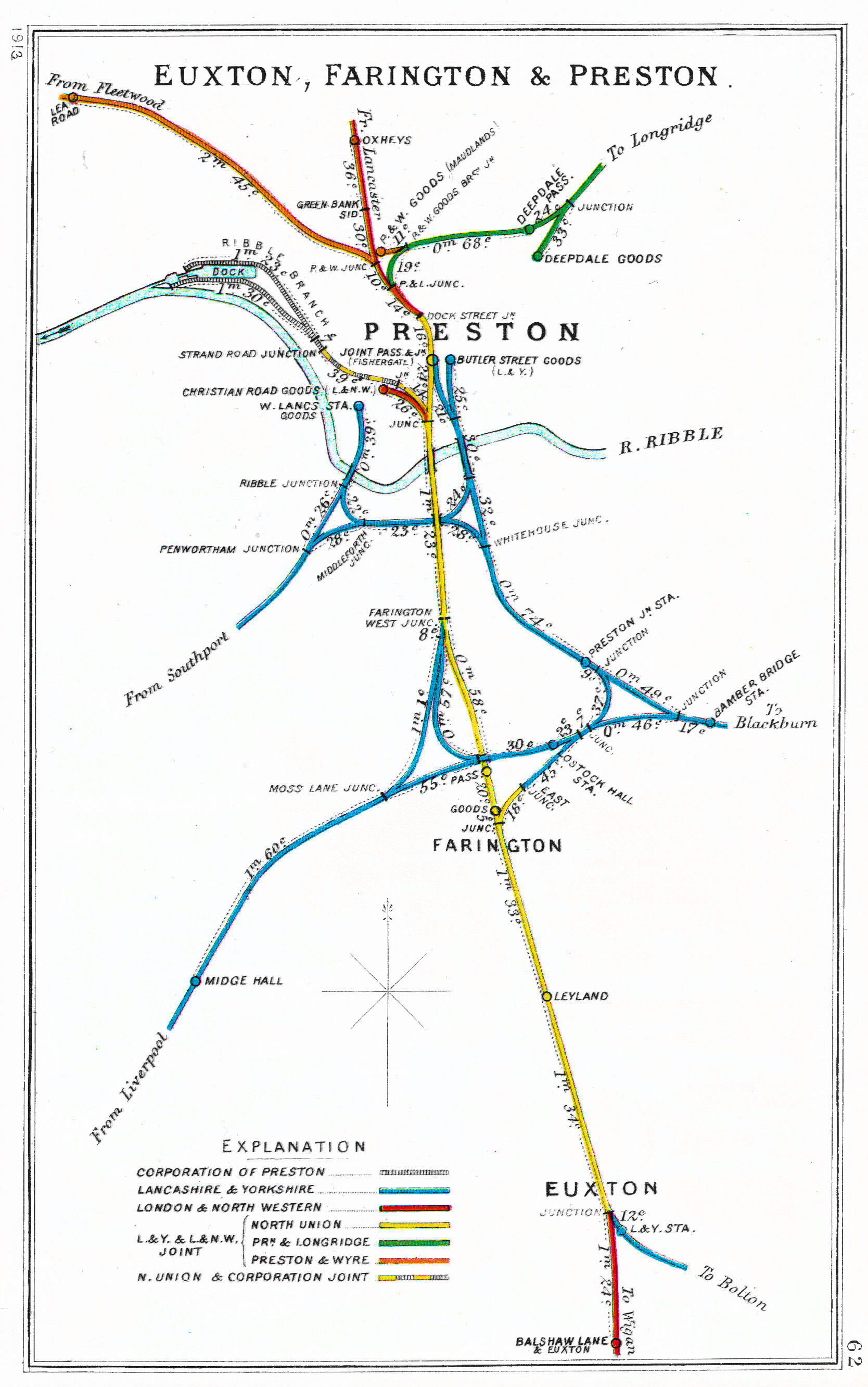
Railways and stations around Preston in 1913

Todd Lane Junction, previously called Preston Junction until 1952, was a railway station between Preston and Bamber Bridge which closed to passenger traffic on 7 October 1968. The station was immediately to the north of a triangular junction between lines from Preston, East Lancashire via Bamber Bridge, and Ormskirk via Lostock Hall. The station served as an interchange between the lines. The line from Preston to Bamber Bridge via Todd Lane remained open for freight trains until 4 September 1972 to serve Lostock Hall Gas Works. The track bed is now a public footpath and cycleway.

This line also connected with the Lostock Hall engine and goods yards on the road between Preston and Leyland, which in their heyday were considered amongst the largest yards of their type in Europe.

On construction, the station had three waiting rooms and porters; parcel and ticket offices. It could be reached via steps that linked it with the Todd Lane (road) bridge over the railway. On the other side of the bridge was the wooden signal box. The line also served the Lostock Hall Gas works and for this purpose was kept open for a number of years after it closed to passenger traffic.

== Accidents and incidents ==
- On 3 August 1896, a passenger train was in collision with a Lancashire and Yorkshire Railway excursion train at Preston Junction, Lancashire due to the driver of the latter misreading signals which resulted in a collision with another train. One person was killed and seven were injured.

Preceding station	Disused railways	Following station
Preston	East Lancashire Railway; Blackburn and Preston Railway	Bamber Bridge
Preston	East Lancashire Railway; Liverpool, Ormskirk and Preston Railway	Lostock Hall
