= Rufford railway station =

Railway station in Lancashire, England

Coordinates: 53.635°N 2.807°W

Rufford
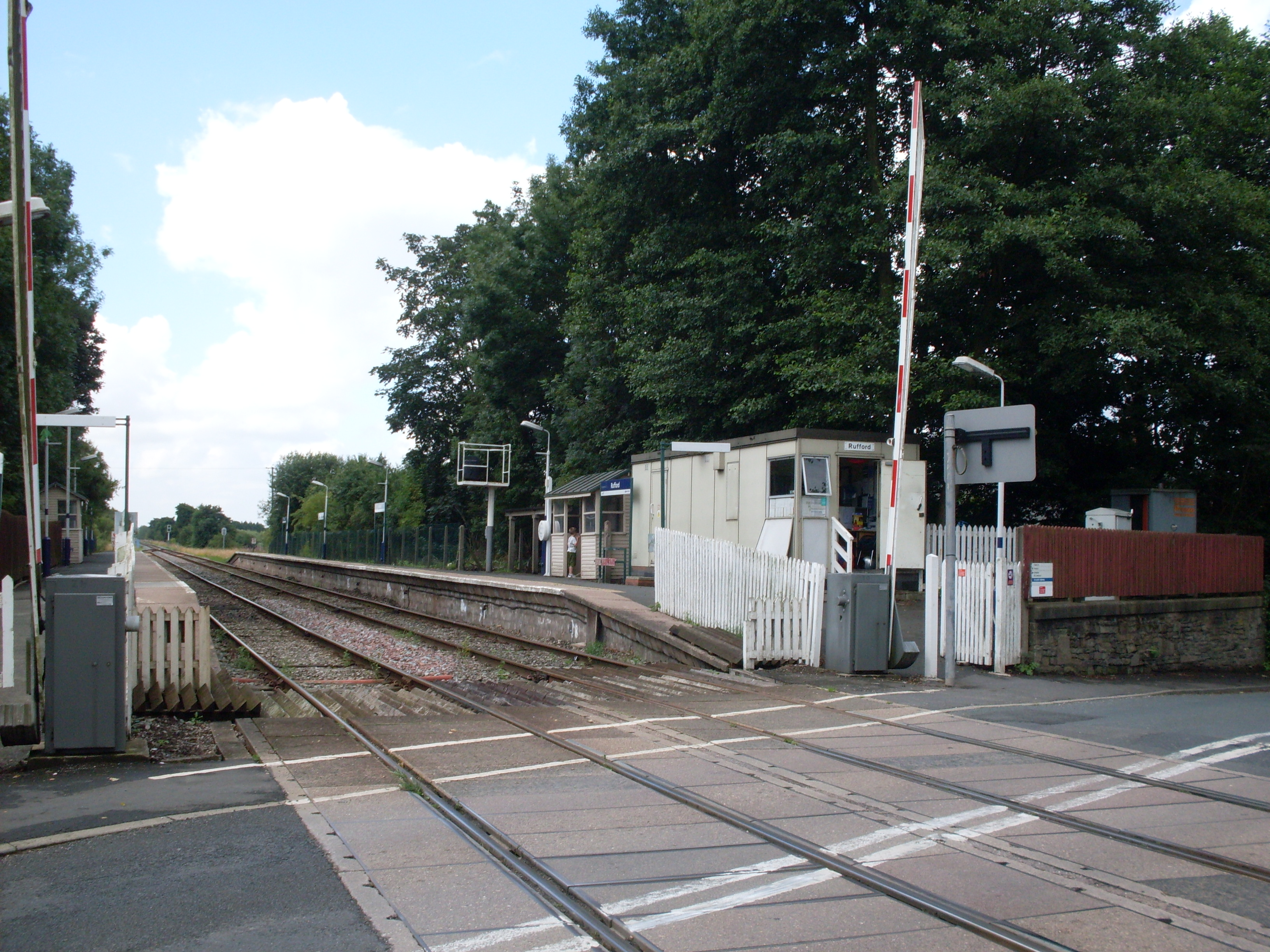

General information
- Location: Rufford, West Lancashire; England
- Grid reference: SD466156
- Manager: Northern Trains
- Platforms: 2

Other information
- Station code: RUF
- Classification: DfT category F2

History
- Opened: 1849

Passengers
- 2021/22: ▲16,060
- 2022/23: ▲17,674
- 2023/24: ▲22,168
- 2024/25: ▲24,438
- 2025/26: ▼23,258
Location
Notes
- Passenger statistics from the Office of Rail and Road

Rufford railway station, opened on 2 April 1849, serves the village of Rufford in Lancashire, England. The station is (9½ miles) south west of Preston on the Preston-Ormskirk branch service. The line was formerly the Liverpool, Ormskirk and Preston Railway, which was quickly merged into the East Lancashire Railway on 3 August 1846; this in turn was merged into the Lancashire and Yorkshire Railway in May 1859.

The level crossing runs across the B5246, the aptly named "Station Road". This is supervised from the nearby signal box, which also controls the only passing loop on the otherwise single track branch line.

== History ==
Direct trains to Liverpool via Ormskirk (and also to Blackburn and East Lancashire) were withdrawn from Rufford station in October 1969, though Liverpool trains continued to run through non-stop until May of the following year. From July 1970, Rufford became the only passing point on the truncated Preston-Ormskirk branch line after the Midge Hall to Ormskirk section was singled. Over that same summer the station was rebuilt, with its wooden platforms and substantial station building demolished and replaced with more functional and basic facilities.

Until the late 1980s, peak-hour trains on the Preston-Ormskirk line continued to cross at Rufford station. Thereafter the timetable was further reduced, leaving the branch line to be operated by a single DMU running essentially along a long siding. Rufford's Victorian signal box was demolished in October 1988 and replaced with a portakabin like structure on the site of the former station building.

Over the past twenty five years, changes in the station's layout and traction have been minimal. The portakabin signal box was due to close, along with that at Midge Hall, in 2017. However as of summer 2023 this has yet to happen. Network Rail plans to automate the crossing here, remove the loop and raise the line speed to 75 mph to allow a more frequent timetable to operate. The crossings trackbed was dug up and re-laid in 2018 in preparation for the automation of the crossing but this has of yet (Summer 2023) to be carried out.

== Service ==
On Mondays to Saturdays there is a service westbound to Ormskirk to connect with the Merseyrail service to Liverpool Central and eastbound to Preston every hour. This is an improvement on the former irregular frequency (twelve per day each way) operated under previous timetables.

There is no Sunday service. A normal service operates on Bank holidays.

Preceding station	National Rail	Following station
Croston	Northern Trains; Ormskirk branch line Mondays-Saturdays only	Burscough Junction
	Disused railways	
Terminus	Lancashire and Yorkshire Railway; Burscough Curves North	Burscough Bridge
