= Burscough Junction rail accident =

1880 railway accident in England

Coordinates: 53.59163°N 2.84758°W

Burscough Junction Station Crash

Details
- Date: 15 January 1880; 18:08
- Location: Burscough, Lancashire
- Country: England
- Line: Lancashire and Yorkshire Railway
- Cause: Human error, Defective signalling, Inadequate track layout

Statistics
- Trains: 2
- Passengers: not known
- Deaths: 9
- Injured: more than 50

The Burscough Junction Station Crash occurred on 15 January 1880 at the Burscough Junction railway station on the Liverpool to Preston railway line in England. The line was operated by the Lancashire and Yorkshire Railway company at the time. There were nine people killed in the accident and more than fifty people were injured.

The cause of the accident was a combination of human error, a defective and inadequate signalling system and an inadequate track layout which could not cope with complex train movements. The Liverpool to Preston line is carried over the Southport to Wigan Line by embankments and a bridge shortly after leaving Burscough Junction Station heading towards Preston, the lines crossing almost at 90 degrees. Two spur lines had been built to connect the Liverpool to Preston railway line to the Wigan to Southport railway line, these spur lines being known as the Burscough Curves. This meant that complicated train movements were being made between the two railway lines, e.g. as both lines were double tracked trains from Southport to Ormskirk, which used the more southerly of the spurs, had first to cross the Wigan to Southport track and then on leaving the spur cross the northbound line from Liverpool to Preston in order to reach the southbound Preston to Liverpool track leading to Ormskirk. At approximately 6:05 pm the southbound train left the station heading for Ormskirk having been turned onto the downline by the signalman on duty at Burscough. 200 yards south of the station, adjacent to the Brickfield (Platts Lane) siding, the train collided with the Liverpool to Preston train which had left Liverpool at 5:30 pm. The northbound train was eventually due to carry on to Fleetwood to disembark passengers for the Belfast steamer ferry.

The first two carriages of both trains were completely shattered and the passengers thrown about in all directions. Those who could, scrambled out of the wreckage to be met by railway officials who had heard the collision and were making their way toward the site of the crash. A number of medical gentlemen arrived by special train and rendered very valuable services. The injured were taken to Preston Infirmary by special train at 10:00pm. The pointsman, Anthony Melia, from Burscough Junction station was taken into custody and appeared at the subsequent inquiry. Anthony Melia was found not guilty, by the inquiry, of criminal negligence

Dr Hall of Preston, who was a passenger on one of the trains rendered valuable assistance at the scene of the accident

== Aftermath ==
As a result of the accident the Lancashire and Yorkshire Railway promised to carry out improvements to the station to prevent a similar disaster occurring. Over the next two years new signal boxes were installed and the entire points system reviewed to allow shunting and local train movements to be independent of main line train operations.

No memorial to the crash exists on the site.

== Victims ==
=== Known Fatalities ===
- Edward Sutton, Ormskirk. Aged 36. Guard, Burscough train.
- Thomas Looney, Ormskirk. Aged 50. Engine driver, Burscough train.
- Robert Sanderson. Aged 20. Fireman, Burscough train.
- Robert Montgomery, Preston. Aged 38. Hatter and clothier.
- Robert Clarkson, Preston Aged 39 Fireman, Liverpool express.
- James Haythornthwaite, Burnley Aged 21 Wholesale potato dealer.
- Michael Boyle, Fleetwood Aged 40 Butcher
- William Rawcliffe, Preston Aged 21 Draper's assistant
- John Henry Crossfield, died 2 February 1880 in Preston Infirmary after having his leg amputated the Sunday prior.

=== Known Injured Persons/Passengers ===
- Frederick Beach, Blackburn (fractured leg)
- Robert Bickerbank, Preston (fractured arm)
- John Bullfield, Preston. Engine driver, Liverpool express.(cuts to head and face, scalded)
- James Brundell, Rufforth. Farmer.(head cuts)
- John Connor, Preston (lacerated ankle)
- Mrs Cropper, Burscough. (badly injured)
- Mr James Culshaw, Liverpool & Southport. Sailor or solicitor. (bad concussion)
- John Dickinson, Croston. Hay & straw dealer.(fracture of left leg)
- James Dixon, Ormskirk. School attendance officer.(fractured ribs, spinal injury, severe concussion)
- Sarah Edmonson, aged 12, stepdaughter to Wm Younds. (leg injury and shock)
- John Graham, Pointsman
- Dr Hall, Preston
- Betsy Hartley, Green Haworth
- Betty Haworth, Accrington
- Rishton Howarth, Accrington. Beer-seller
- Elizabeth Iddon ('otherwise Meadows'), Burscough (dislocation of leg and knee, scalp wound)
- Mrs Kirk, Liverpool
- Mr T. Kissack, Southport. Architect
- Fred Leech, Blackburn (fractured leg)
- Mr Leicester, Ormskirk.
- James Martland, Burscough. Potato dealer.(severe shock)
- Jane McGrovey (McPearcy?), Liverpool
- William Mercer (Jnr), Ormskirk. Brewer (fractured leg)
- John O'Connor, Blackburn (lacerated leg)
- James Orritt, Ormskirk. Butcher, (severely shaken)
- Robert Pickaavant, Preston (fractured arm)
- Anne Price, aged 12, niece of Mrs Iddon (head injury)
- John Proctor, Ainsdale, Southport (fractured leg and severe facial cuts)
- Mrs Rawcliffe, Preston. Hosier (compound leg fracture) - her husband died
- James Rimmer, Aughton Moss (shock)
- Mrs Rimmer, Aughton Moss. (shock)
- William Scott, Skipton (lacerated)
- John Shorrock, Birkdale. Farmer.(injury to ribs and shock)
- Richard Shaw, Scarisbrick. Farmer.(injury to eye, head, leg)
- Moses Smith. Guard on the express. (Nose injury and shock)
- Mary Staniforth, Plough Inn, Preston
- Mr Thomason, Ormskirk (leg badly hurt)
- Mr Thompson, Waterloo, Liverpool (head injuries)
- Henry Thwaites, Preston (both legs broken and collar bone)
- Mr Watson, Halstall-Lane. (shock)
- John Yonds & step-daughter, Liverpool
- William Younds, canal boat captain (severe cuts to face and leg)
- Hannah Younds, wife of William. (fractured ribs)
