= Croston railway station =

Railway station in Lancashire, England

Croston
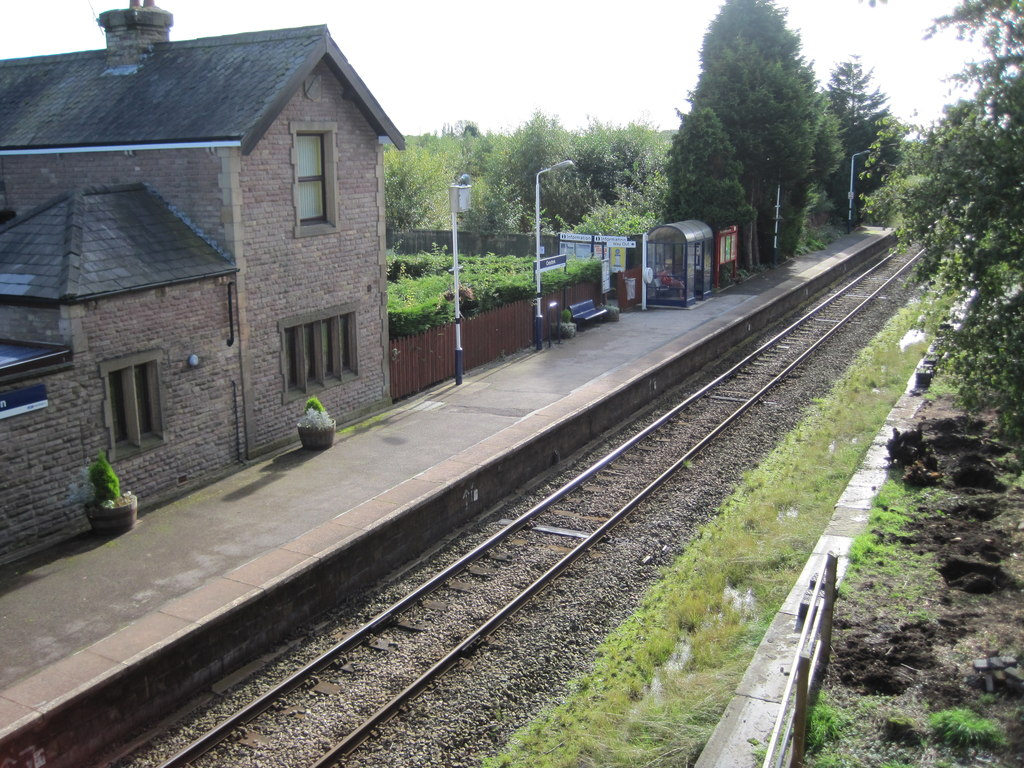

General information
- Location: Croston, Chorley; England
- Coordinates: 53.668°N 2.778°W
- Grid reference: SD487192
- Manager: Northern Trains
- Platforms: 1

Other information
- Station code: CSO
- Classification: DfT category F2

History
- Original company: Liverpool, Ormskirk and Preston Railway
- Pre-grouping: Lancashire and Yorkshire Railway
- Post-grouping: London Midland and Scottish Railway

Key dates
- 2 April 1849: Opened

Passengers
- 2021/22: ▲36,622
- 2022/23: ▲38,758
- 2023/24: ▲45,964
- 2024/25: ▲56,382
- 2025/26: ▲63,564
Location
Notes
- Passenger statistics from the Office of Rail and Road

Croston railway station serves the small village of Croston, near Chorley in Lancashire, England; the station is on the Ormskirk Branch Line 7 miles (11 km) south west of Preston. It is unstaffed and the old station buildings are now privately occupied.

The station was built & opened by the Liverpool, Ormskirk and Preston Railway (later taken over by the Lancashire and Yorkshire Railway) along with the line in April 1849. "Line" is the suitable word here, as along the way are clear signs of the former double track trunk route from Preston to Liverpool Exchange, which was severely rationalised (including the reduction to single line working) in 1970.

The line once carried numerous express trains to Glasgow Central Edinburgh, Blackpool North and the Lake District, though Croston was usually served only by local stopping services from Liverpool to Preston and Blackburn.

Trains connect at Ormskirk with Merseyrail services to Liverpool Central. Croston enjoys bus connections to nearby Leyland, Chorley, Southport, and Preston. It is on the B5247 into Bretherton.

The single platform still in use has a shelter & digital information screen, but has no ticket vending facilities. Step-free access is available for disabled travellers.

== Services ==
Monday to Saturdays sees an hourly service operate each way to Preston and Ormskirk. There is no Sunday service.

Preceding station	National Rail	Following station
Preston	Northern Trains; Ormskirk branch line Mondays-Saturdays only	Rufford
