= Oxheys railway station =

Former station in Preston, Lancashire

Oxheys railway station was a single platform station in Preston, Lancashire, England, on what was then the Lancaster and Preston Junction Railway. The associated signal box was built in the 1920s by the London, Midland and Scottish Railway.

It served Oxheys Cattle Market on Brook Street. It was located 793 yards from Preston railway station and closed in 1925.

Preceding station	Historical railways	Following station
Preston	London and North Western Railway; Lancaster and Preston Junction Railway	Barton and Broughton
