= Bamber Bridge railway station =

Railway station in Lancashire, England

Coordinates: 53.727°N 2.661°W

Bamber Bridge
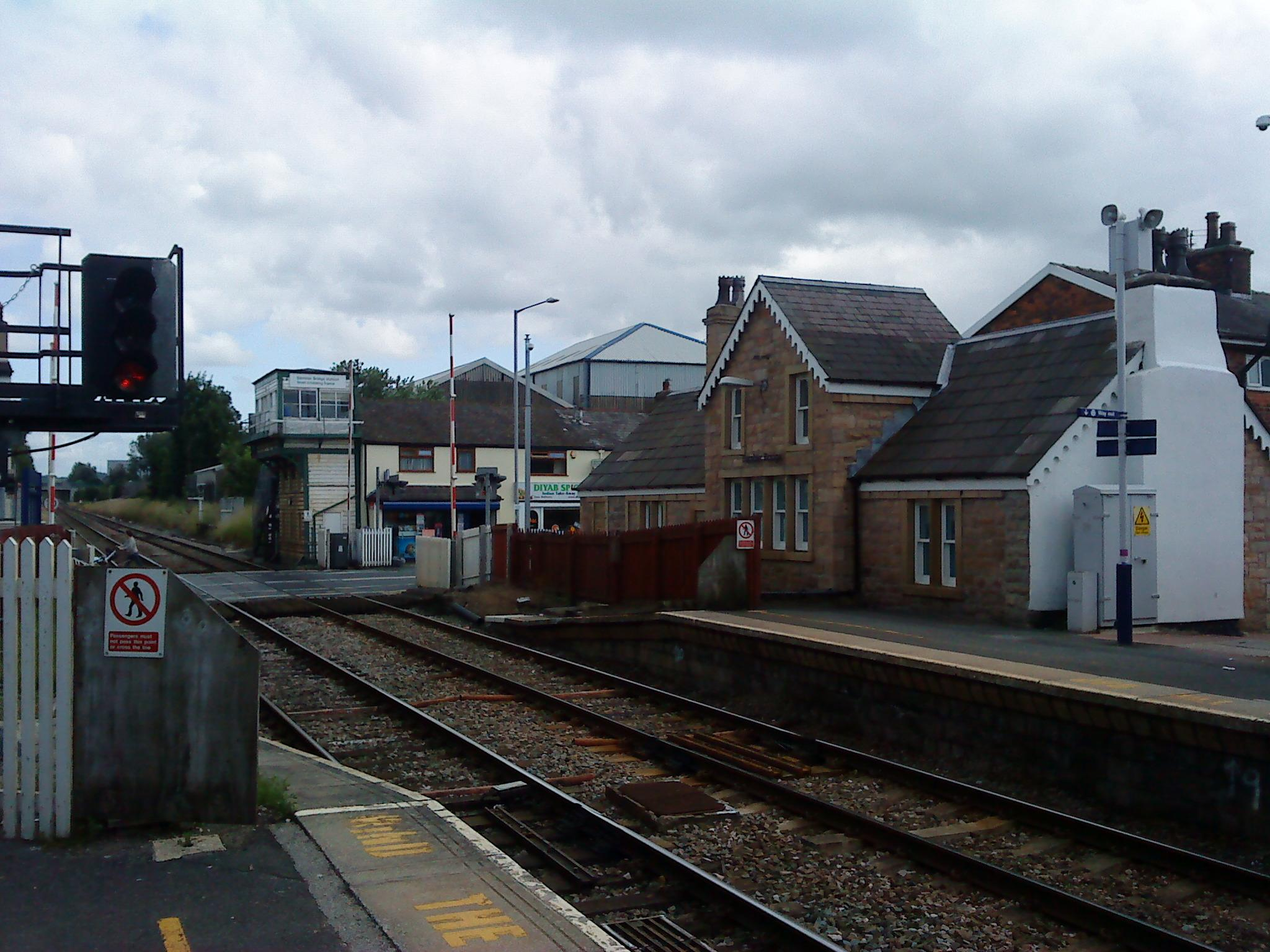
- Bamber Bridge railway station in 2009

General information
- Location: Bamber Bridge, South Ribble; England
- Grid reference: SD564258
- Managed by: Northern Trains
- Platforms: 2

Other information
- Station code: BMB
- Classification: DfT category F2

History
- Opened: 1846

Passengers
- 2020/21: ▼20,844
- 2021/22: ▲67,978
- 2022/23: ▲69,168
- 2023/24: ▲73,916
- 2024/25: ▲75,068
Location
Notes
- Passenger statistics from the Office of Rail and Road

Bamber Bridge railway station serves the village of Bamber Bridge in Lancashire, England. It is situated on the East Lancashire Line and is managed by Northern Trains.

== Description ==
Its railway station, in common with Lostock Hall, was once much larger and used by many more trains than today. Opened in 1846 by the Blackburn & Preston Railway, it became a junction four years later when the B&PR's successor the East Lancashire Railway opened a direct route to Preston that avoided the need to use the North Union Railway between Farington and Preston (and thus pay hefty tolls to the NUR company). The Liverpool, Ormskirk and Preston Railway had in the meantime arrived at Lostock Hall in 1849, putting the village on the main line from Blackburn to Liverpool.

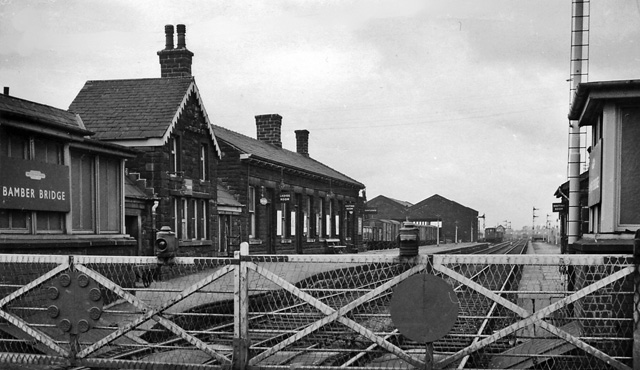
The station in 1963

These newer lines all fell victim to BR economies in the aftermath of the Beeching Axe - the direct line to Preston closing to all traffic in April 1972 (services henceforth reverted to using the original 1846 line through Lostock Hall then the 1908-built Farington Curve to reach the WCML) and the Blackburn to Liverpool trains ending on 6 October 1969. The line was resignalled in 1973 and is now controlled by the power box at Preston, although the distinctive signal box still remains to supervise three level crossings (one here locally and two further east by CCTV).

On the westbound platform, the station building built in 1846 survives but is no longer used as part of the station. The building has been disused recently but is now being converted into a drop-in centre for pensioners. The waiting room on the eastbound platform and the old pedestrian subway linking the two platforms have both been removed.

Bamber Bridge may not strictly be a "one-street village", but each train to pass through stops traffic; the level crossing cuts across the main road. Only Northern trains en route to and from Preston use Bamber Bridge. It has two platforms, but is unstaffed (so tickets must be purchased from the ticket machine or on the train when travelling from here). Passenger information screens are in operation at the station, along with a long-line P.A system to provide train running information.

As of January 2018, along with other Stations on this line, a new touch screen Ticket Machine was added to the Station.

== Services ==
Monday to Saturdays, there is an hourly service from Bamber Bridge towards Preston westbound and Blackburn, Burnley and Colne, eastbound. This drops to two-hourly in each direction on Sundays, with westbound trains running to Blackpool South.

In addition to the basic service, two additional calls are provided by services on the York & Leeds to Blackpool North line during the morning peak period to give additional journey opportunities to Preston for commuters & shoppers. There is also one evening peak additional train from Preston to Blackburn and Leeds/York that stops here.

Preceding station	National Rail	Following station
Lostock Hall	Northern Trains East Lancashire Line	Pleasington
