= Ormskirk railway station =

Railway station in Lancashire, England

Ormskirk
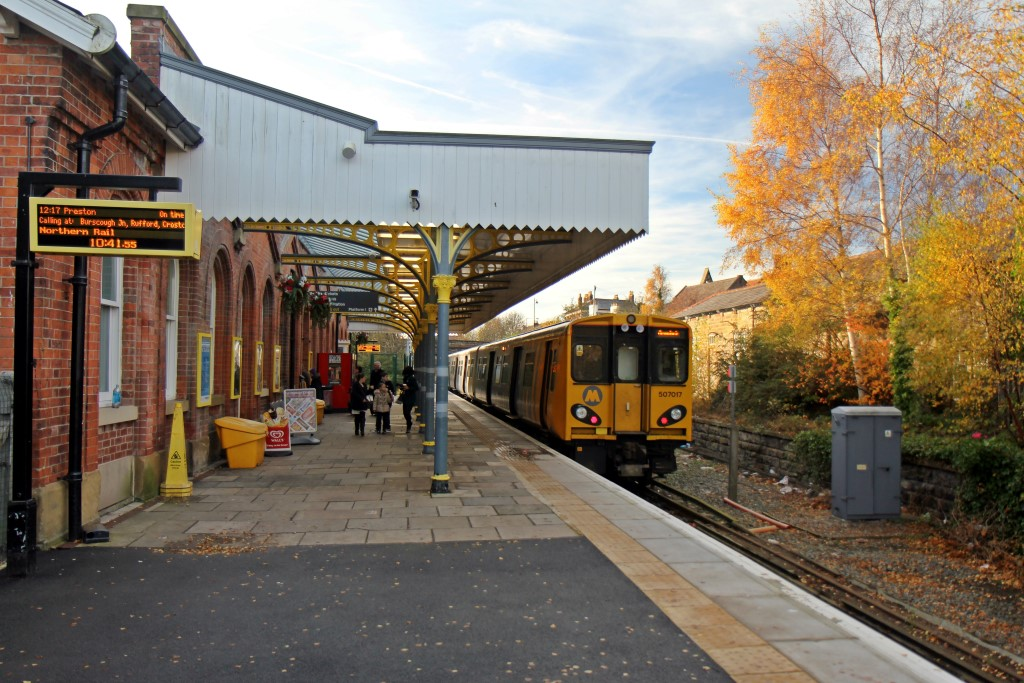
- A view of the Merseyrail end of the platform.

General information
- Location: Ormskirk, West Lancashire; England
- Coordinates: 53.5692°N 2.8811°W
- Grid reference: SD417084
- Manager: Merseyrail
- Transit authority: Merseytravel
- Platforms: 2

Other information
- Station code: OMS
- Fare zone: F
- Classification: DfT category D

History
- Original company: Liverpool, Ormskirk and Preston Railway
- Pre-grouping: Lancashire and Yorkshire Railway
- Post-grouping: London Midland and Scottish Railway

Key dates
- 2 April 1849: Opened

Passengers
- 2020/21: ▼0.549 million
- Interchange: ▼5,148
- 2021/22: ▲1.664 million
- Interchange: ▲17,412
- 2022/23: ▲1.821 million
- Interchange: ▲23,139
- 2023/24: ▲1.964 million
- Interchange: ▼22,927
- 2024/25: ▲2.297 million
- Interchange: ▲24,090
Location
Notes
- Passenger statistics from the Office of Rail and Road

Ormskirk railway station in Ormskirk, Lancashire, England, is a cross-platform interchange between Merseyrail services from Liverpool Central and Northern Trains services from Preston on the Ormskirk branch line, 12 3/4 miles (20.5 km) northeast of Liverpool. The station building and three arch road bridge are both Grade II listed structures.

== History ==
The station was built by the East Lancashire Railway's Liverpool, Ormskirk and Preston Junction section, and opened on 2 April 1849. From 13 May 1859, the station was owned by the Lancashire and Yorkshire Railway. From 1 January 1923 the station was owned by the London, Midland and Scottish Railway. British Railways nationalised all railways on 1 January 1948 and the station became part of the London Midland Region.

A branch line to Rainford Junction via Skelmersdale was opened by the ELR in March 1858 shortly before it was absorbed by the L&YR – this left the main line to Preston just to the north of the station. The line from Liverpool was subsequently electrified in 1913, with the suburban EMUs using a bay platform at the southern end of the station to keep them clear of the busy main line to Preston, which was used as the L&Y's principal route to East Lancashire, the Fylde, Cumbria and Scotland.

=== 1977 ===
The original Liverpool terminus of the line (Liverpool Exchange) was closed in 1977, when the route became one of the three branches of the new Northern Line and trains began running to a new underground terminus at Liverpool Central. Since 1996, it has been part of the Merseyrail franchise currently (2016) run by Serco-Abellio.

== Station layout ==
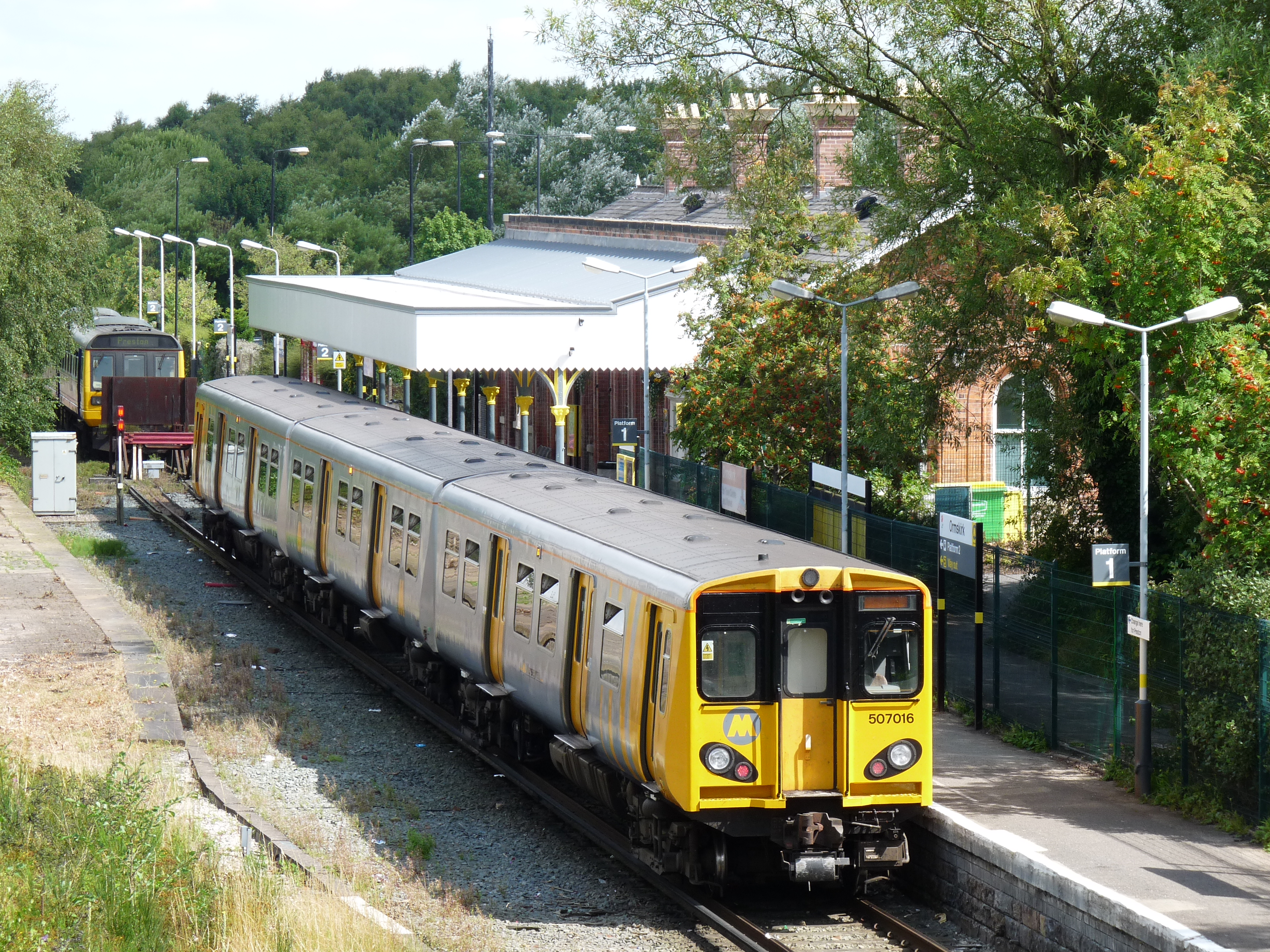
Merseyrail electric and Northern diesel trains wait at the same platform. The trains are separated by buffer stops

The current station consists of a single platform. An interesting characteristic is how the electric Merseyrail track and the unelectrified Northern track is on the same alignment, with electric and diesel trains using opposite ends of the same platform. The line is cut by a large buffer separating the track sections. Passengers wishing to transfer from an electric train to diesel train walk a dozen yards or so along the same platform to move between trains. Until 2023, a similar layout existed at Kirkby station and currently at Headbolt Lane station.

Prior to the Beeching Report of 1963 and the subsequent restructuring of the rail network, there were two main through platforms. The electric Liverpool commuter trains would pull into the southern bay platform. This practice ended following the withdrawal of through trains between Liverpool and Preston via this route. Local services from Preston, East Lancashire and Blackpool towards Liverpool were either withdrawn or terminated at Ormskirk from October 1969 with the last through trains running on 3 May 1970. From 4 May 1970 the line was split, with all trains using the former Liverpool platform (the Preston-bound platform remains, however is disused). The bay platform is now a footpath leading to the bus station.

Only a single Merseyrail third-rail electric line runs into the platform, the route towards Liverpool becomes double immediately outside the station. The line from Ormskirk to Preston has been single track since the summer of 1970, except for a passing loop at Rufford.

The former link between Ormskirk and Southport, via the Burscough Curves, was closed in 1962. The Skelmersdale Branch has also been lost, having closed to passengers in 1956 and to all traffic seven years later. It was lifted in 1968, though the Burscough curves remained extant until the mid-1980s.

== Facilities ==
The station underwent a £1.5 million renovation during 2009. Among the refurbishments include a new booking hall, waiting room, toilet facilities, ticket counters and new automatic swinging doors, as well as a remodelled and landscaped path and bicycle route up to the bus interchange. The station is classed as eco-friendly and gets its green credentials by using a system that harvests rainwater, as well as other various energy-saving measures. During October & November 2018 the height, width and layout of the platforms were adjusted to prepare for Merseyrail's new fleet of trains which are due to be introduced from 2020.

The station is staffed, 15 minutes before the first train and 15 minutes after the last train, and has platform CCTV. There is a payphone, waiting room, booking office and live departure and arrival screens, for passenger information. The station has a free car park, with 108 spaces, as well as a 2-space cycle rack and secure storage for 28 cycles. The station and platforms have full disabled access but the car park has uneven ramp access.

== Services ==
Services to Hunts Cross via Liverpool Central operate frequently, running every 15 minutes during the day (Mon-Sat) and every 30 minutes at other times (evenings and Sundays). Services to Preston now run hourly Monday–Saturday (since the May 2018 timetable change). There is no Sunday service to Preston.

== Future ==
There have been calls from local authorities and the local rail user group to reopen both curves at Burscough to allow the reinstatement of through trains from Ormskirk to Southport, as well as to reinstate through services between Preston and Liverpool via Ormskirk and to rebuild and reopen the Skelmersdale branch. Merseytravel's 2014 Liverpool City Region Long Term Rail Strategy does not back plans for an Ormskirk to Skelmersdale route (instead proposing that the link be provided from the Kirkby to Wigan Wallgate line), but it suggests that a new bi-level interchange at Burscough Bridge could be built, to provide improved interchange facilities between the Ormskirk branch and the Wigan to Southport line, in addition to reopening the curves and extending electrification through to Preston and Southport.

Liverpool City Region Combined Authority, Long Term Rail Strategy document of October 2017, page 37, states a review to introduce new Merseyrail battery trains will be undertaken in 2020, in view to put Preston interchange station onto the Merseyrail network by extending the Merseyrail Northern Line from Ormskirk to Preston. The aim is to have Preston one of the terminals of the Northern Line, with Burscough Junction, Rufford and Croston stations brought onto the Merseyrail network. The document states, "The potential use of battery powered Merseyrail units may improve the business case".

== Gallery ==
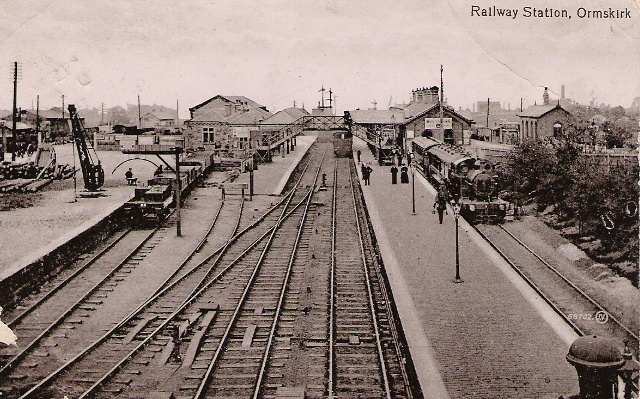
Ormskirk railway station on a postcard dated 1915. The station's layout today is much reduced.

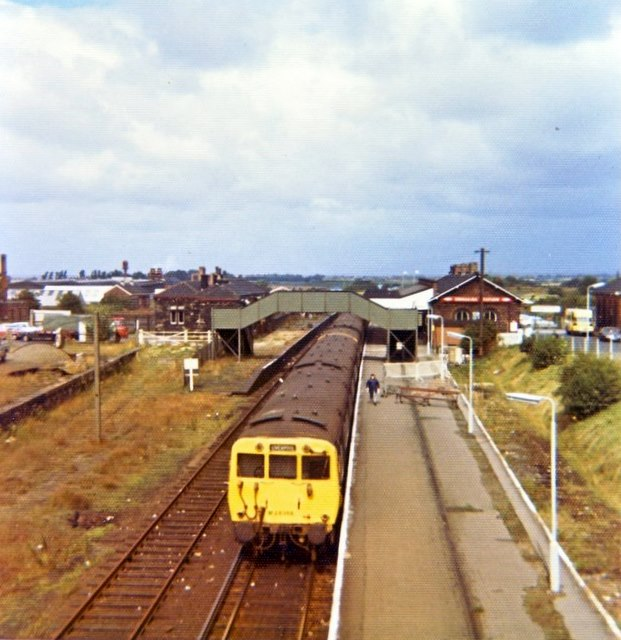
A view of the station in 1973, before a passing loop was removed.

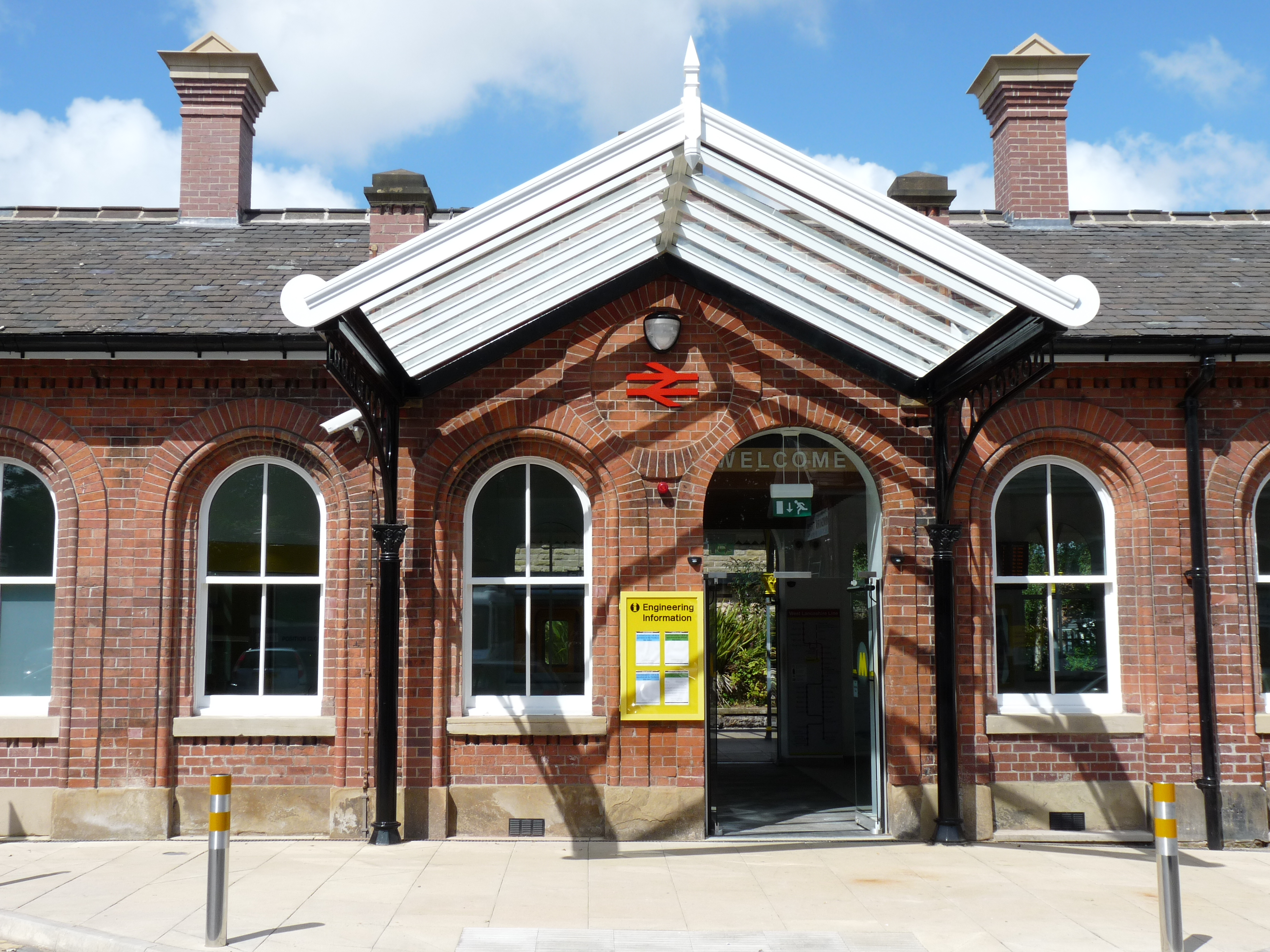
The entrance to the station's ticket hall, which was refurbished in 2009.

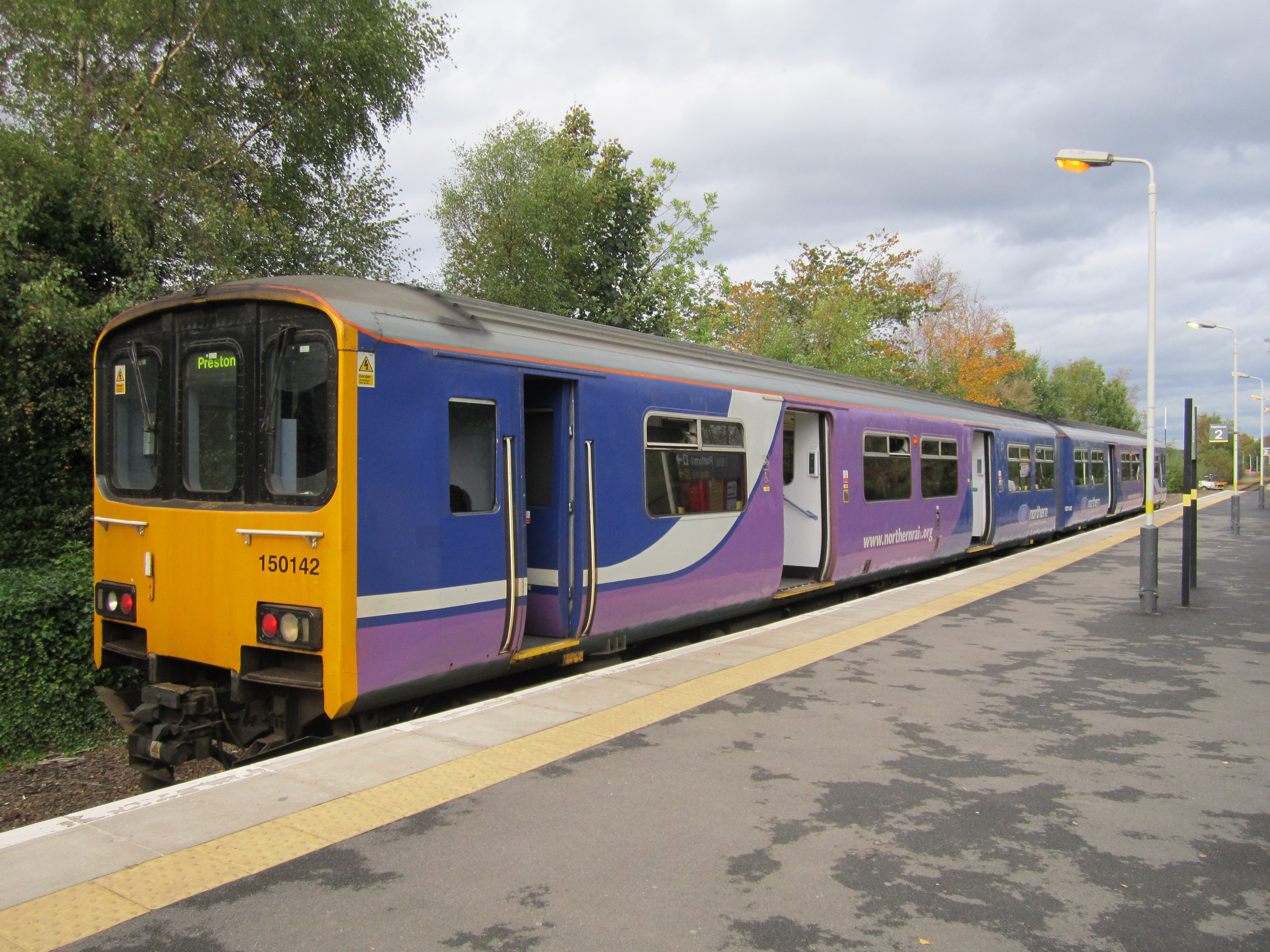
A Northern Rail Class 150 waits with a service to Preston on the Ormskirk branch line.

== See also ==
- Listed buildings in Ormskirk

Preceding station	National Rail	Following station
Terminus	Merseyrail; Northern Line	Aughton Park towards Liverpool Central
Burscough Junction	Northern Trains; Ormskirk branch line	Terminus
	Historical railways	
Burscough Junction	East Lancashire Railway; Liverpool, Ormskirk and Preston Railway	Town Green
	Disused railways	
Westhead Halt	Lancashire and Yorkshire Railway; Skelmersdale Branch	Terminus
