= Burscough Junction railway station =

Railway station in Lancashire, England

Coordinates: 53°35′51.0″N 2°50′26.3″W

Burscough Junction
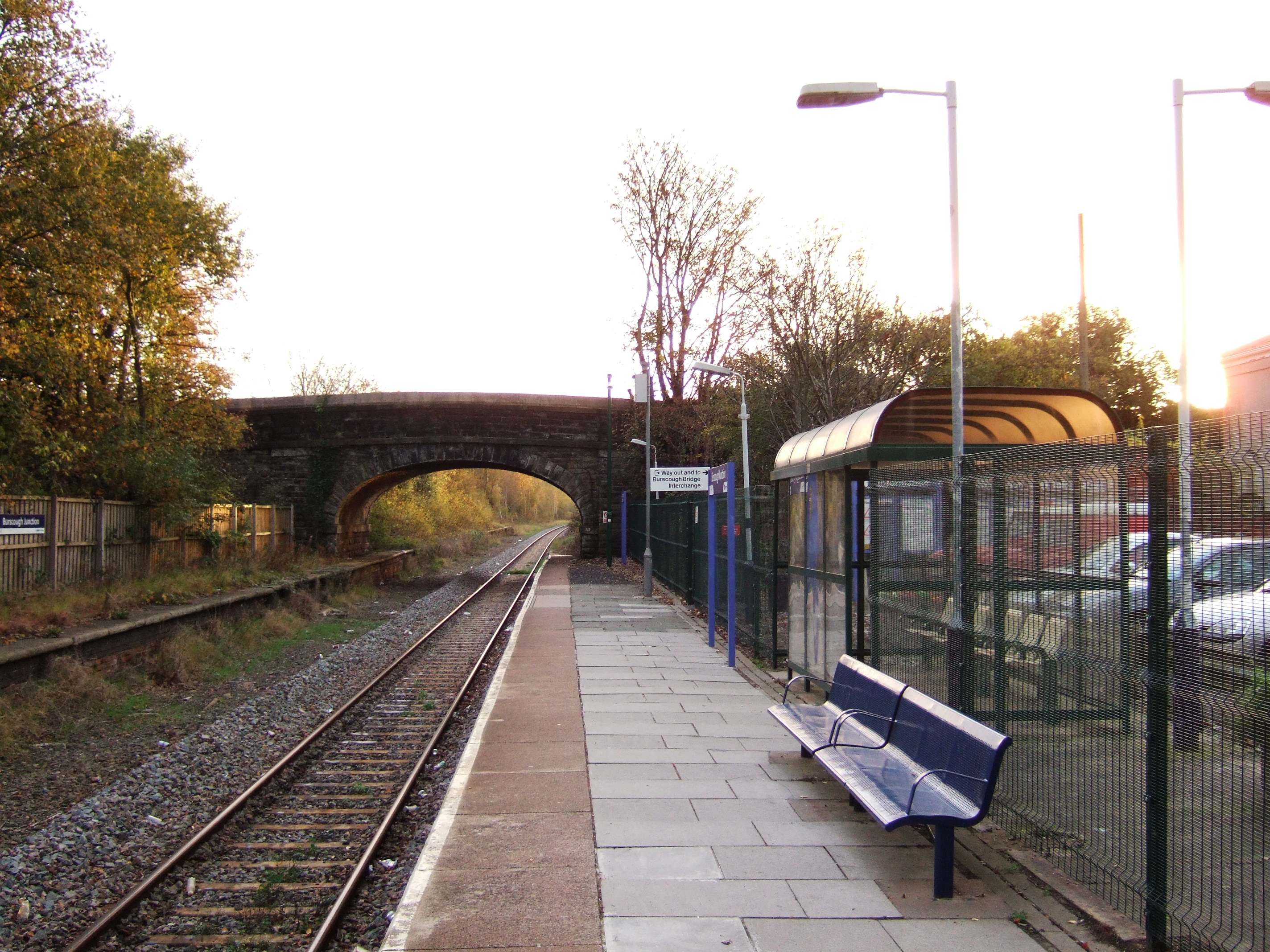

General information
- Location: Burscough, West Lancashire; England
- Grid reference: SD444115
- Manager: Northern Trains
- Platforms: 1

Other information
- Station code: BCJ
- Classification: DfT category F2

History
- Opened: 1849

Passengers
- 2021/22: ▲40,584
- 2022/23: ▼40,270
- 2023/24: ▲47,946
- 2024/25: ▲50,780
- 2025/26: ▲55,568
Location
Notes
- Passenger statistics from the Office of Rail and Road

Burscough Junction pronounced (Burs/co Junction) is one of two railway stations serving the town of Burscough in Lancashire, England. It is sited on the Ormskirk Branch Line, 2 1/2 miles (4 km) north of Ormskirk and is served by Northern Trains. The station was the scene of the Burscough Junction rail accident in 1880.

== Service ==
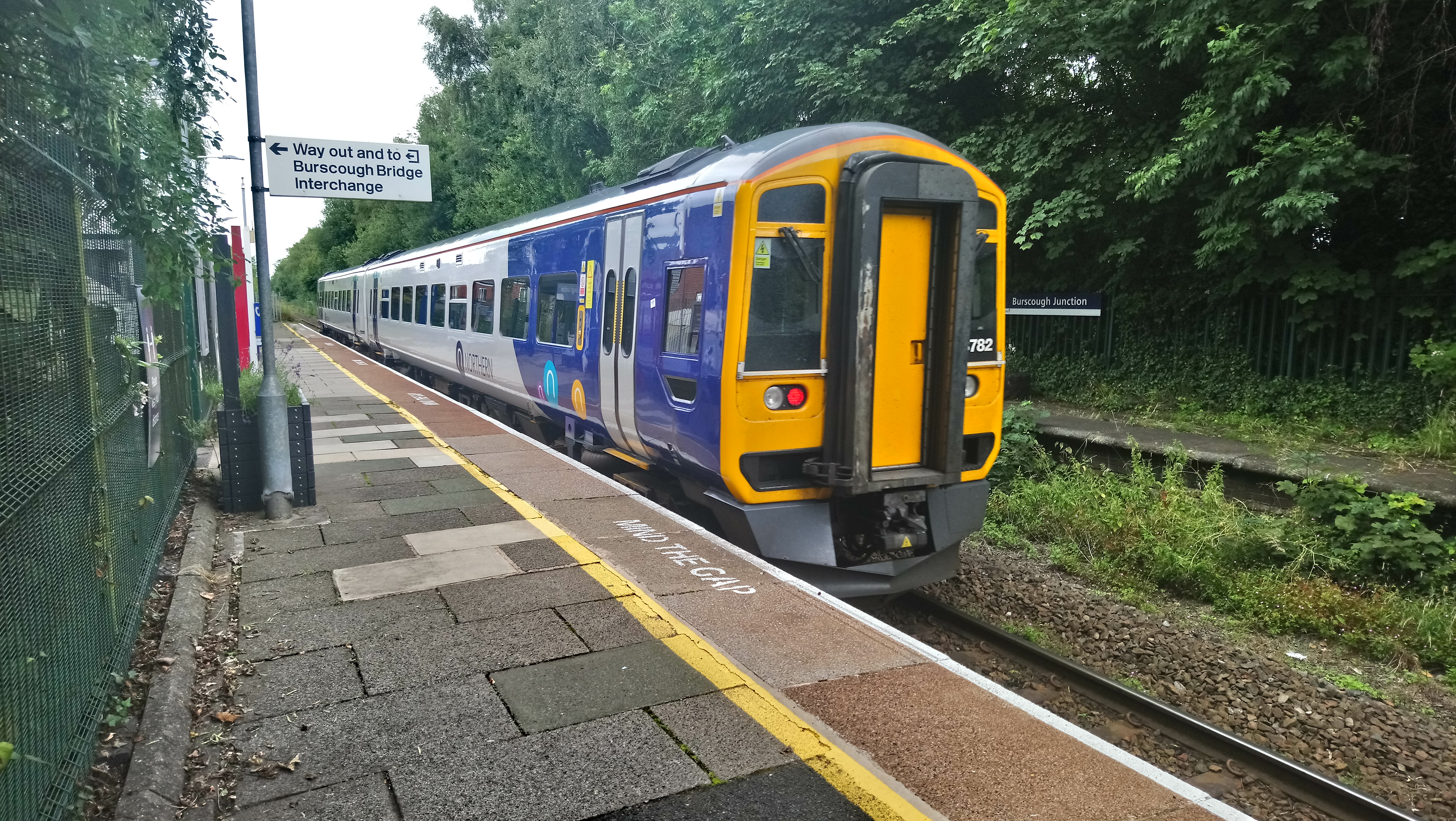
A Northern class 158 stopping at Burscough Junction with a service from Ormskirk to Preston.

The line sees a Monday–Saturday service of approximately every hour each way (since the May 2018 timetable change), with northbound services running through to Blackpool South (though not advertised as such in the timetable). There is no Sunday service.

== History ==
The station opened in April 1849, and enjoyed a regular service to numerous destinations, including Preston, Blackburn, Southport and Liverpool.

A serious railway accident occurred near the station in 1880 (for full details see Burscough Junction rail accident). After the locomotive swapped ends of the train at Burscough Junction it should have swapped line on departure for Liverpool, but the points had not been set to swap tracks, and so it proceeded straight on and it met the express from Liverpool, head on, at some distance down the line.

From the autumn of 1968, stopping express services to Scotland and the Lake District were withdrawn. In October of the following year, through trains to Blackburn also ceased and the remaining Blackpool to Liverpool stopping service was cut back to Ormskirk, leaving only local services and a few non-stop expresses; the line was severed entirely at Ormskirk from 4 May 1970. Singling followed at the end of June 1970. Unlike the other stations at Croston and Rufford, Burscough Junction retained its station buildings for a few years. These were demolished at the end of 1973, and replaced with the current, extremely basic, arrangement.

== Interchange ==
The other station in Burscough is Burscough Bridge, and is only ten minutes away by foot. The name "Junction" is an anachronism: similar to Dalston Junction in London, the station no longer serves such a purpose.

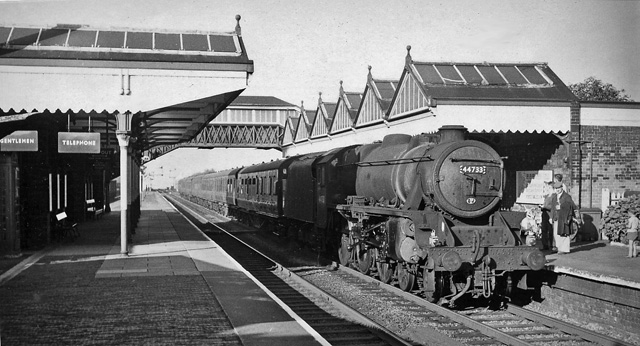
The station in 1964

== Facilities ==
Only one platform remains in use, with basic shelters and a long-line public address system. There are ticket machines which require card, so passengers paying cash will need to pay on the train. The platform is fully DDA-compliant, with step free access from the main entrance on Station Lane.

== Notes ==
Preceding station	National Rail	Following station
Rufford	Northern Trains; Ormskirk branch line Mondays-Saturdays only	Ormskirk
	Disused railways	
Burscough Bridge	Lancashire and Yorkshire Railway; Burscough Curves South	Terminus
