= Farington railway station =

Former railway station in Lancashire, England

Coordinates: 53.7217°N 2.6972°W

Farington
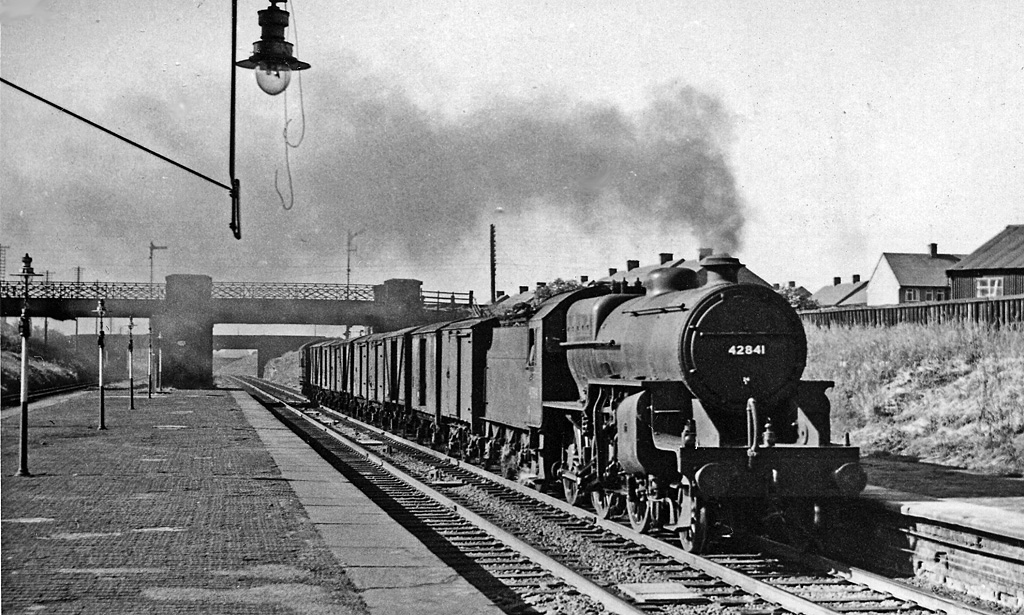
- A freight train passing through in 1957

General information
- Location: Farington, South Ribble; England
- Platforms: 4

Other information
- Status: Disused

History
- Original company: North Union Railway
- Pre-grouping: NUR
- Post-grouping: London, Midland and Scottish Railway

Key dates
- 31 October 1838: Opened as Farrington
- October 1857: Renamed Farington
- 7 March 1960: Station closes to regular traffic
Location

Farington railway station served the village of Farington, south of Preston, in Lancashire, England.

== History ==
The station opened on 31 October 1838 under the ownership of the North Union Railway and was originally named Farrington. In October 1857, it was renamed Farington. It became a junction in 1846 when the Blackburn and Preston Railway opened its line from Blackburn, which joined the main line a short distance to the south. This link only survived in regular use for four years however, as a dispute between the B&PR's successor the East Lancashire Railway and the NUR over access to the main line to Preston and the sizeable tolls the ELR had to pay to use it led to the latter company building its own independent route into the city.

Thereafter, original B&PR link fell into disuse and was severed (though it eventually reopened in 1886 with the main line junction altered to face south), whilst the station reverted to a purely local role, served by stopping trains between Wigan North Western and Preston on the main line. This was quadrupled at the end of the 19th century and the station expanded to four platforms as a consequence.

Preceding station	Historical railways	Following station
Preston; Line and station open	North Union Railway	Leyland; Line and station open

== Closure ==
Farington station was closed by the British Transport Commission on 7 March 1960, before the Beeching Axe of 1963, and was subsequently demolished.

== The site today ==
West Coast Main Line trains run through Farington and still carry many inter-city and semi-local services. The East Lancashire Line crosses over the line close by.

Lostock Hall railway station (on the East Lancashire Line) and Leyland railway station (on the West Coast Main Line) are now the nearest stops to the village.

== Gallery ==
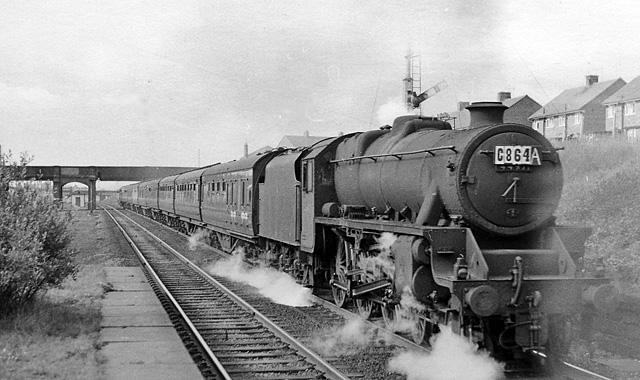
Farington station remains, view northward in 1959

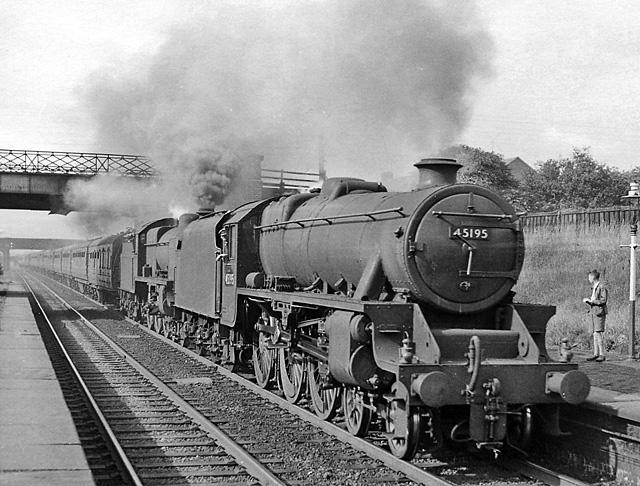
Farington station remains, with a trainspotter, in 1959

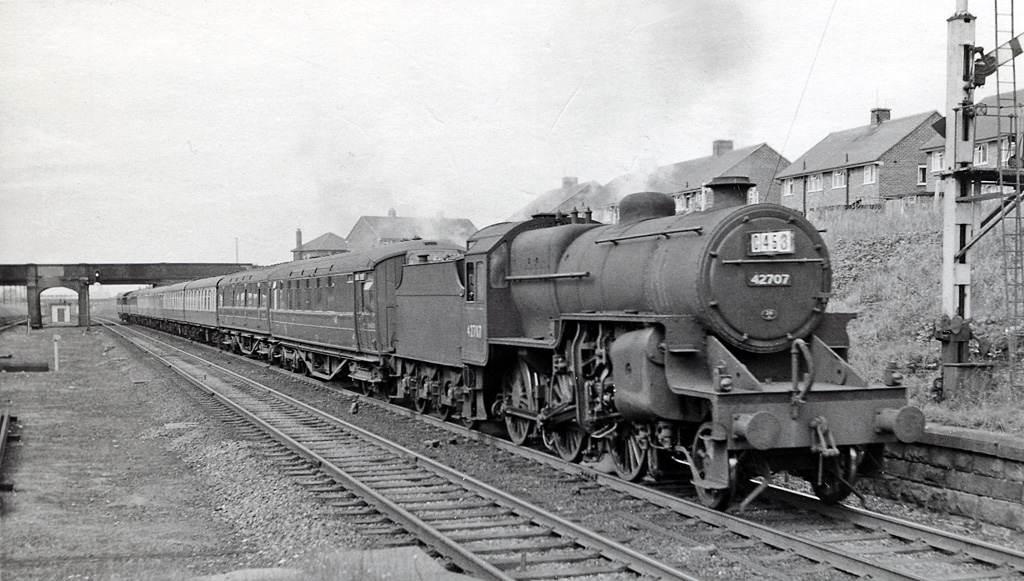
Return holiday express at Farington, in 1959

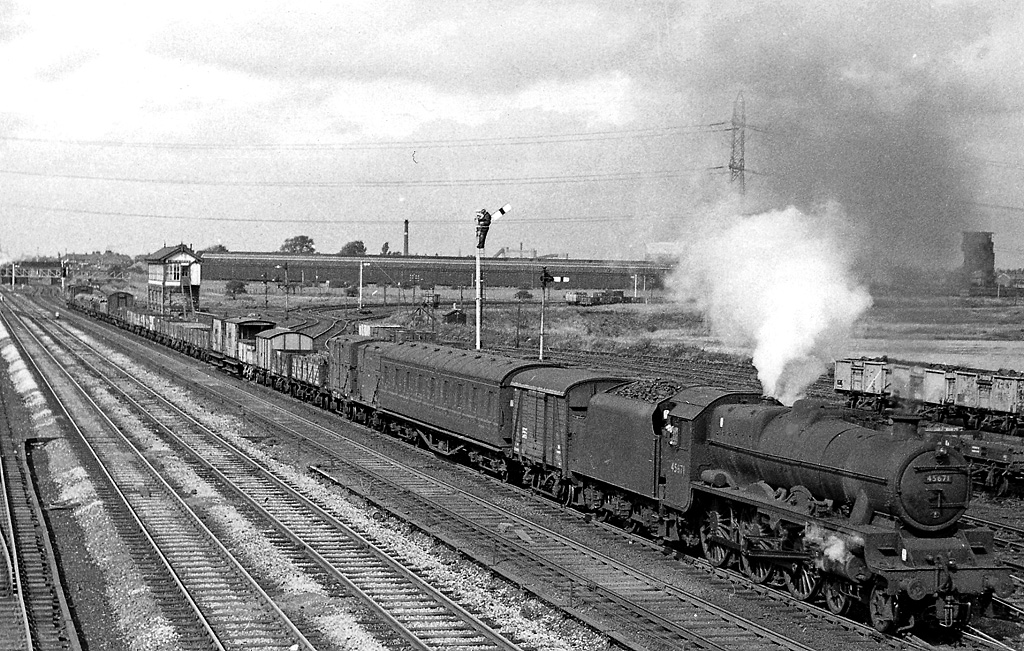
Farington Junction, in 1962

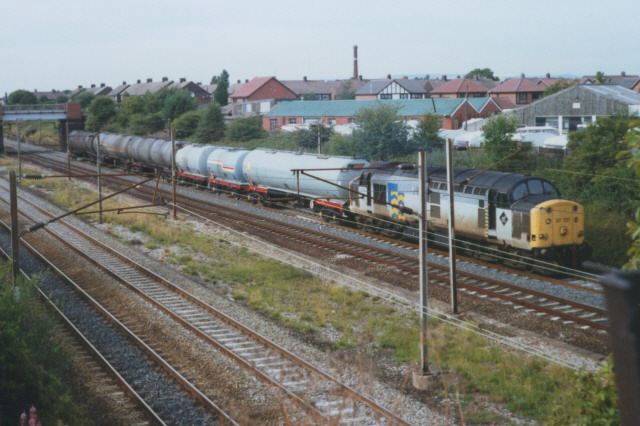
Site of Farington railway station, in 1992
