= Preston railway station =

Grade II listed railway station in Lancashire, England

Preston
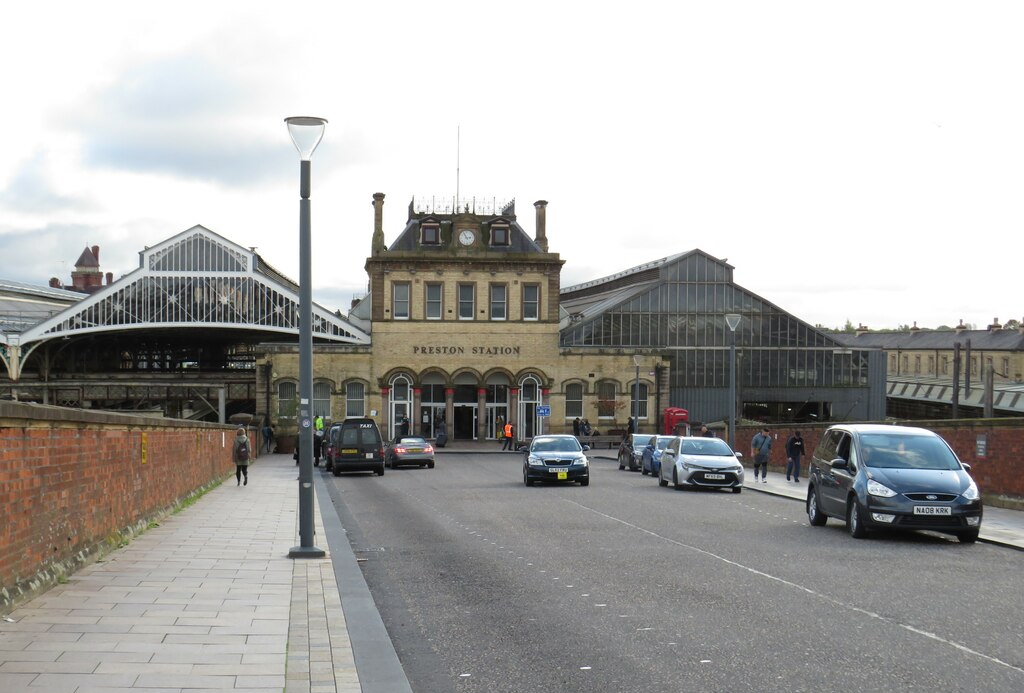
- Main entrance and train sheds.

General information
- Location: Preston, City of Preston, England
- Coordinates: 53.7560°N 2.7072°W
- Grid reference: SD534290
- Manager: Avanti West Coast
- Platforms: 9 (7 in public use)

Other information
- Station code: PRE
- Classification: DfT category B

Key dates
- 31 October 1838: Opened
- 2 September 1850: East Lancashire platforms added
- July 1880: Rebuilt
- 1903: New platforms added to west side
- 1913: New platforms added to east side
- 1972: East Lancashire platforms closed

Passengers
- 2021/22: ▲4.165 million
- Interchange: ▲1.036 million
- 2022/23: ▲4.237 million
- Interchange: ▲1.083 million
- 2023/24: ▲4.835 million
- Interchange: ▲1.247 million
- 2024/25: ▲5.356 million
- Interchange: ▼1.228 million
- 2024/25: ▲5.876 million
- Interchange: ▲1.236 million
Location
- Location within Preston city centre Location within Lancashire
Notes
- Passenger statistics from the Office of Rail and Road

Preston railway station serves the city of Preston, in Lancashire, England. It is an interchange on the West Coast Main Line, which lies approximately half-way between London Euston and Glasgow Central. (Note: The station is 209 miles (336 km) from London Euston and 194 miles (312 km) from Glasgow Central) Inter-city trains to London Euston, Birmingham New Street, Manchester Piccadilly, Liverpool Lime Street, Glasgow Central and Edinburgh Waverley are provided by Avanti West Coast, TransPennine Express and Caledonian Sleeper; Northern Trains operates local services to Cumbria, Greater Manchester, Merseyside, Yorkshire and other parts of Lancashire.

The North Union Railway opened a station on the site in 1838. It was extended in 1850, with new platforms under the separate management of the East Lancashire Railway; by 1863, London-Scotland trains stopped here to allow passengers to eat in the station dining room. The current station was built in 1880; it was extended in 1903 and 1913, when it had 15 platforms. A free buffet for servicemen was provided during both World Wars. The East Lancashire platforms were demolished in the 1970s, following closure of some connecting lines.

== History ==
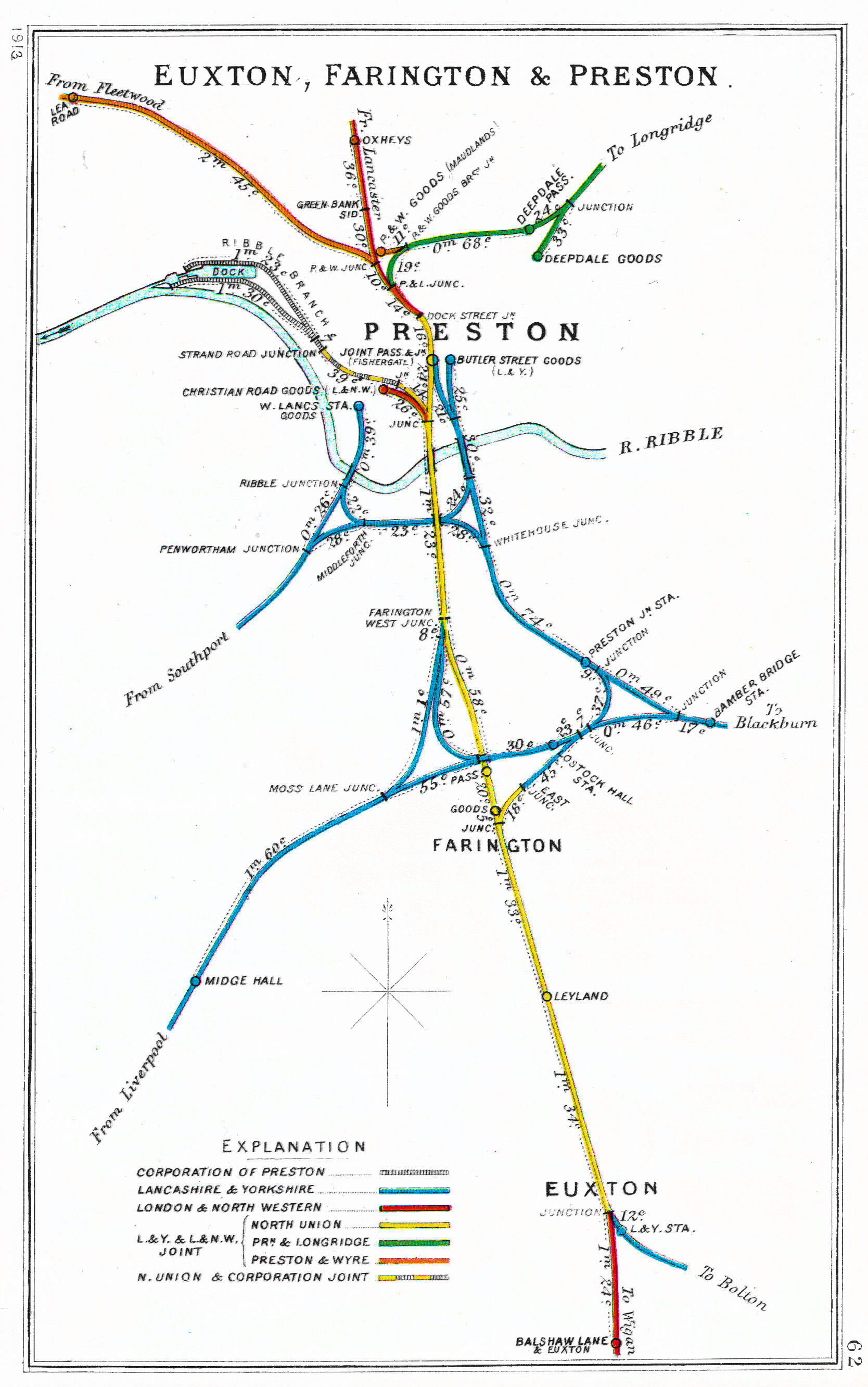
Railways around Preston in 1913

In its coaching days, Preston was an important centre for both passenger and postal traffic. This importance continued into the railway age, both as a major junction and as a stopping point about halfway between London and Glasgow.

=== Preston's railways ===
The first railway lines in Preston were those of the Lancaster Canal Tramroad, a horse-drawn line connecting two parts of the Lancaster Canal. It opened in 1805, but never carried passengers and never converted to steam. It ceased operating in Preston in 1862.

The first steam-hauled passenger railway in Preston was the North Union Railway (NUR). On 31 October 1838, it opened its line from Wigan to a site on the present-day Preston station. This immediately linked the town to the cities of London, Birmingham, Liverpool and Manchester.

Each subsequent line was built by a different company. Rivalry often prevented any co-operation over shared facilities, and so almost every railway line into Preston used its own station. It was not until 1900 that all lines in Preston shared a single station, by which time all the companies had been taken over by one or both of just two companies.

The second passenger railway into Preston was the Preston and Longridge Railway, which opened as another horse-drawn tramway on 1 May 1840, to a terminus in Deepdale Street. It converted to steam in 1848, but did not run its trains into the North Union station until 1885.

The Lancaster and Preston Junction Railway (L&PJR) was the third line, which opened on 25 June 1840, initially using the North Union station. However, relations between the NUR and L&PJR soured; from 1 January 1842, most L&PJR trains used Maxwell House instead, a short distance to the north of the North Union station. A few trains passed through, but the NUR charged a toll of 6d per passenger. Most passengers refused to pay, preferring to alight at Maxwell House and walk the 200 yards (200 m) to the North Union station, but the NUR refused to hold the train to allow passengers to walk and rebook. The NUR advised northbound passengers to travel by the Lancaster Canal rather than the L&PJR. On 1 January 1844, Maxwell House station came into the possession of the NUR, and lack of agreement led to several weeks when hapless L&PJR passengers had to alight on the trackside at nearby Dock Street (off Pitt Street). Lancaster trains were able to use the North Union station from 12 February.

Preston's fourth railway was the Preston and Wyre Joint Railway to Fleetwood, opening, just a few weeks after the L&PJR, on 16 July 1840, to its own terminus at Maudlands in Leighton Street. After 12 February 1844, regular Preston and Wyre trains used the North Union station, along with the L&PJR, although Maudlands continued to be used for excursions for some decades.

The fifth company to run trains into Preston was the Bolton and Preston Railway (BPR), from 22 June 1843. Its line joined the North Union's at Euxton Junction, 5 1/2 miles (9 km) south of Preston, but the company used Maxwell House instead of the North Union's. However, the NUR charged 1s per passenger to BPR trains over its tracks, and eventually the BPR resorted to ferrying its passengers by road between Euxton and Preston. The BPR was driven into submission and was taken over by the NUR from 1 January 1844.

The sixth line into Preston was that of the Preston and Blackburn Railway, which opened on 1 June 1846, joining the North Union line immediately south of Farrington station (respelt Farington from October 1857). The railway company was absorbed into the East Lancashire Railway (ELR) on 3 August 1846. Once again, the NUR charged high tolls for the use of its line which led the ELR to build its own line into Preston. The line was initially opposed by Preston Corporation, but was eventually permitted on condition that the embankment north of the Ribble (which later became the dividing line between Avenham and Miller Parks) be ornamentally laid out, and that a pedestrian path (still in use today) be provided on the river bridge. The line ran into new platforms built on the east side of the North Union station, which were managed and staffed by the ELR, and which had their own booking hall and entrance in Butler Street. The new platforms were effectively a separate station. The new line and station opened on 2 September 1850.

The seventh line in Preston was the North Union's own Victoria Quay Branch to Victoria Quay on the river Ribble (later extended to Preston Docks in 1882 and which now connects to the heritage Ribble Steam Railway). The single-track goods line opened in October 1846 from a south-facing junction immediately south of Preston Station, through a tight curve into a tunnel with a gradient of 1 in 29, emerging north of Fishergate Hill near the riverside.

The eighth line to Preston was the Liverpool, Ormskirk and Preston Railway, owned by the ELR and connected to its Blackburn line into Preston. It opened on 2 April 1849. From 1891, its trains used a new curve at Farington to enter the town via the North Union line.

The ninth and final line into Preston was the West Lancashire Railway (WLR) from Southport. The railway arrived in Preston on 16 September 1882, by which time all the town's other lines were owned by the London and North Western Railway (LNWR) or the Lancashire and Yorkshire Railway (LYR), or jointly by both. The independent WLR built its own Fishergate Hill station. It also built a connecting line to the former ELR (then LYR) line, via which the majority of Southport-to-Preston trains continued to Blackburn. The railway was not a success, and on 1 July 1897 it was taken over by the LYR. This resulted in the diversion of all passenger services to use the East Lancashire platforms at Preston from 16 July 1900.

The network of lines south of Preston allowed great flexibility in the routing of trains. A train approaching the town on any of the lines from the south (except the WLR from Southport) could be routed to enter the station via either the North Union or the East Lancashire line. It was even possible for trains from the north to perform an effective U-turn, a feat sometimes carried out by trains between Scotland and Blackpool that would otherwise have had to reverse.

=== Development ===
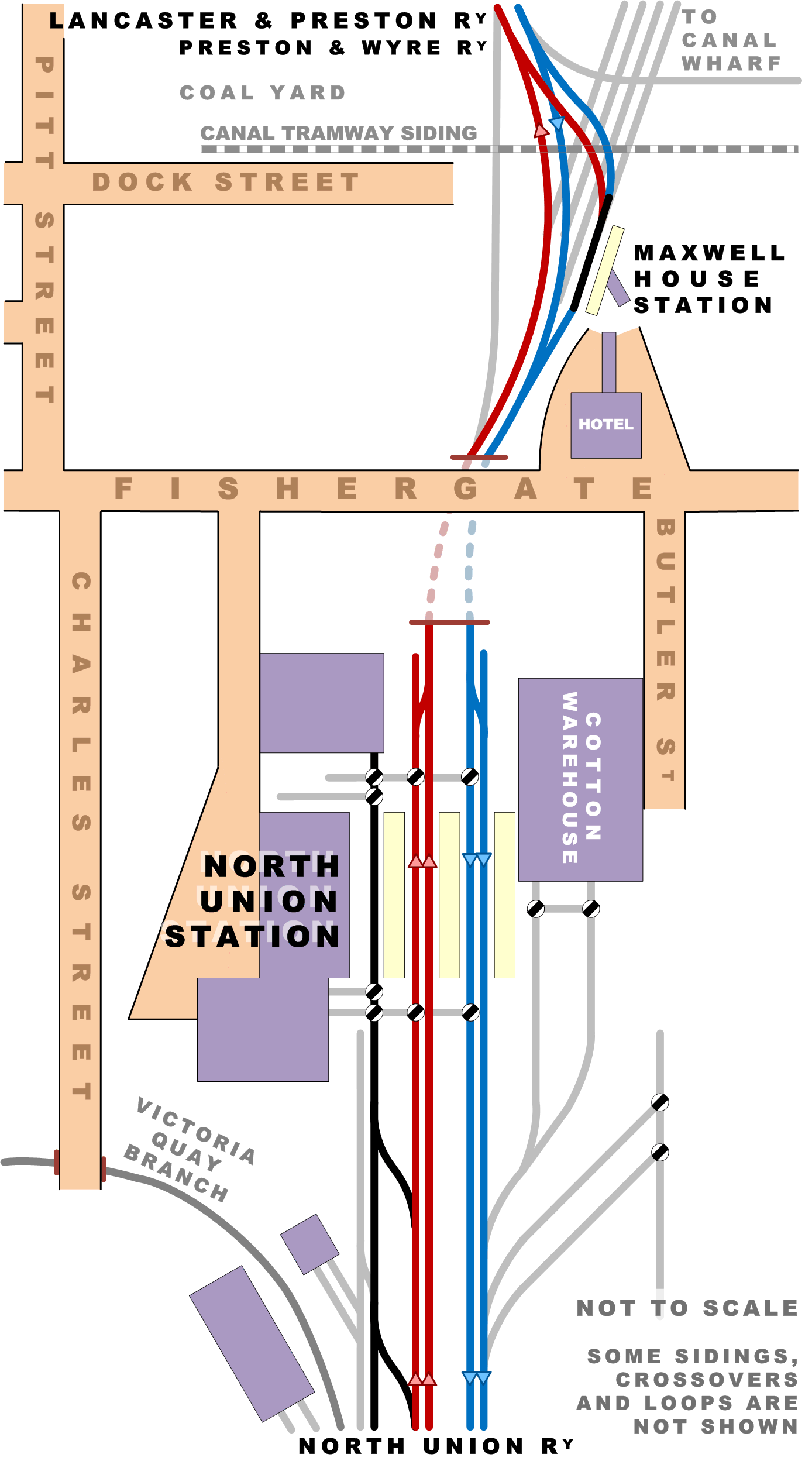
Layout of station until 1850

When the station was first opened in 1838 by the North Union Railway, the line north of the station passed through a tunnel under the west end of Fishergate (then Preston's major thoroughfare). It was on a slope so steep that sometimes station staff had to push trains out of the station.

By 1846, the station was already very busy, handling trains from Wigan and the south, Bolton, Fleetwood, Blackpool, Lancaster and the north, and Blackburn. There were no footbridges; passengers had to cross the lines escorted by station staff. North of the station was a network of goods lines around the end of the Lancaster Canal. The coal yards and sidings here continued to operate long after the canal had fallen into commercial disuse.

The station's first expansion came in 1850 when the new East Lancashire line used new platforms staffed and managed by the East Lancashire Railway, with their own entrance and booking office in Butler Street. From 1863, trains between London and Scotland, having no dining cars, were scheduled to allow 20 minutes at Preston for passengers to eat in the station's dining room. The pressure on catering staff was increased when northbound and southbound trains would often arrive about the same time. The condition of the station deteriorated to the extent that on 18 August 1866 part of the roof on the East Lancashire side collapsed injuring three people, one seriously. By then, 150 trains a day passed through the station.

Eventually the station was rebuilt, at a cost of £250,000,reopening in July 1880, and with seven through platforms and four bay platforms. At this time, both the Ribble bridge and the line as far as Euxton, were widened from two tracks to four. A striking feature of the new station was its long and wide central island platform, 1,225 feet (373 m) long and 110 feet (34 m) wide. It was larger than any of the London terminal station platforms; the longest being Kings Cross at 990 feet (302 m). Along the centre of the platform were refreshment rooms, offices and waiting rooms. A booking hall at the north end of the station was accessed from the middle of a new bridge carrying Fishergate over the railway. A broad ramp led down to the main island platform, with footbridges to smaller platforms on either side. Further south, the platforms were also linked by a passenger subway and a separate subway for luggage, accessed via hoists. At the south end of the main platform, a footbridge led to the nearby Park Hotel, a joint LYR/LNWR property, opened in 1883.

On 30 January 1877, a heavy storm blew the roof completely away from the station, A more serious accident occurred on 13 July 1896, when a London to Glasgow train passed through the station at an estimated 45 mph (70 km/h), despite a 10 mph (16 km/h) speed limit. It was derailed on a tight curve at the north end of the station, killing one person. As a result of this, the tracks were realigned. Charles Street, to the west of the station, was demolished, as were more houses north-west of the station. Fishergate bridge was extended on its west side. This allowed more tracks and platforms to be built on the west side of the station, with gentler curves. The Ribble bridge was widened again, from four to six tracks. These enlargements were completed by 1903. The east side of the station was also extended in 1913.

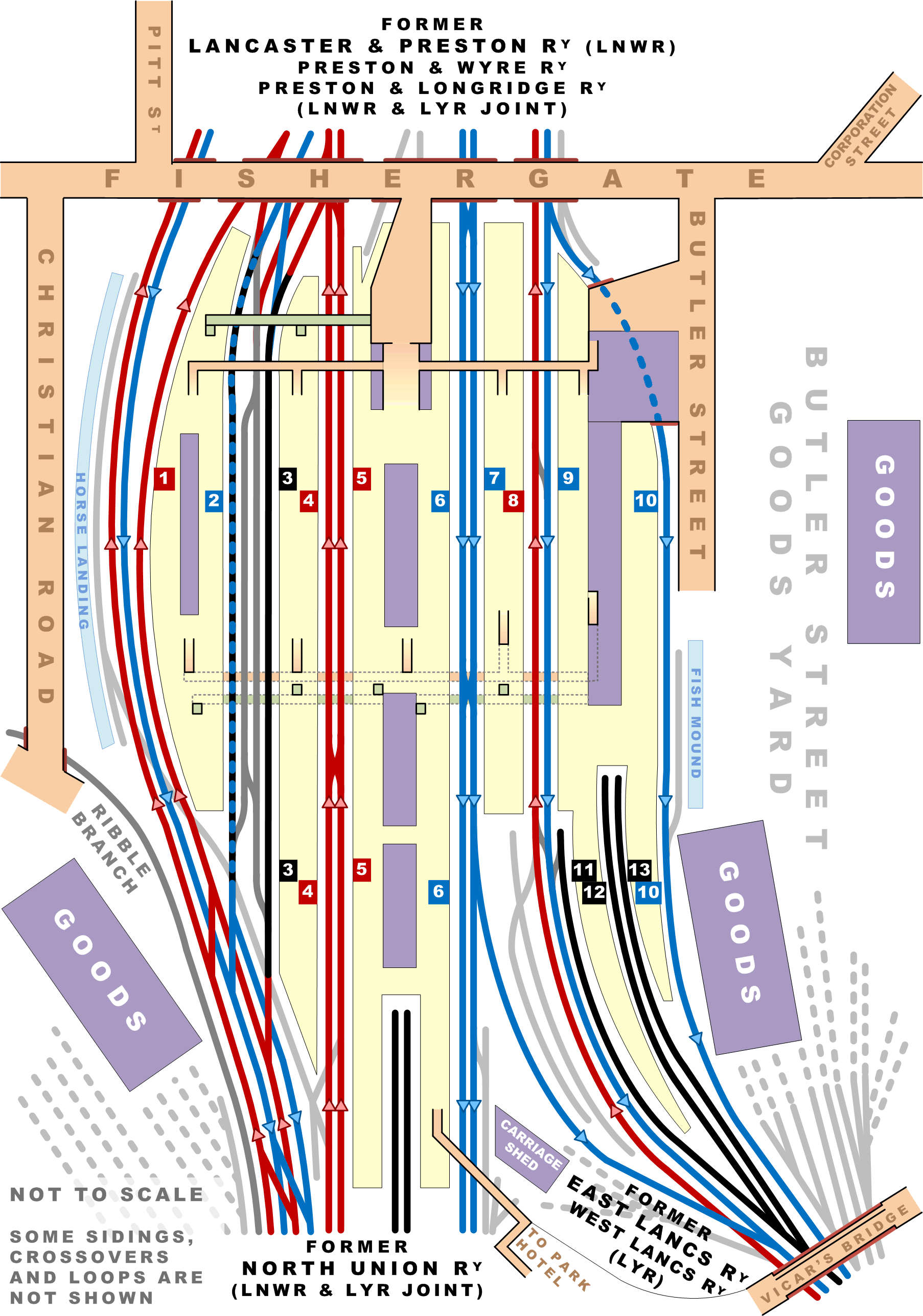
Layout of the station in 1926

By 1926, the lines and platforms were used as follows, from west to east:

- South-west of the station was Christian Road goods station (previously known as Charles Street goods station before 1903).
- Next was the single-track goods line that curved west to enter the tunnel to the docks.
- North of the tunnel was a goods loading platform, added in 1903.
- Then were two through lines for non-stop traffic, added in 1903.
- Platforms 1 and 2 formed a large island platform, added in 1903, with station buildings, handling through traffic to and from Blackpool. Platform 2 was also used as a terminal platform for Longridge trains and as a reversal platform for trains between Lancaster and Blackpool.
- Between platforms 2 and 3 was a centre line, used as a run-around loop.
- Platforms 3 and 4 formed a narrow island platform without buildings. Platform 3 was used for terminal and reversal trains, as platform 2. Platform 4 was a loop for platform 5.
- Platforms 5 and 6 formed the main, wide island platform, with a full set of buildings along its centre. The platforms were used mainly for West Coast Main Line services, northbound and southbound respectively. At the south end were two bay platforms, between platforms 5 and 6, used for short trains and goods vans.
- Platforms 7 and 8 formed another narrow island platform, somewhat shorter than the other platforms. Platform 7 was a loop for platform 6. Platform 8 was the northbound East Lancashire through platform.
- Platform 9 was the main southbound East Lancashire through platform, containing more buildings and linked to the Butler Street station entrance.
- Platform 10 was added in 1913, as another southbound East Lancashire through platform, which trains accessed via a short tunnel underneath a rebuilt Butler Street entrance.
- Platform 11 was a bay platform, set back at the south end of platform 9, and curving sharply to the east.
- Platforms 12 and 13 were bay platforms, between platforms 11 and 10, also curving east. All three bay platforms were for terminating services to and from Southport, Blackburn and Liverpool, via Ormskirk. Platform 13 was added in 1913.
- To the east of the station was Butler Street goods station, with a large number of sidings and two warehouses.

Later, platforms 11, 12, 13 and 10 were renumbered into the more logical sequence 10, 11, 12 and 13.

=== Contraction ===
A number of lines around Preston have closed, including the Longridge line in 1930 and the West Lancashire line in 1964. The old island platforms one and two were closed in 1970 together with the goods lines to the west of the station, but it was then extended northwards to allow platform two to become a dedicated parcels platform. The line towards Liverpool was truncated and singled in summer 1970, with Preston services terminating at Ormskirk. This was followed by the closure of the East Lancashire line, between Preston and Bamber Bridge via its original direct route, in April 1972.

The East Lancashire platforms 10 to 13 were demolished, along with the Butler Street Goods Yard. Their site is now covered by car parks for the station and the adjacent Fishergate Shopping Centre, which was built in the 1980s, partly over the north end of the former goods yard. The remaining platforms 3 to 9 were renumbered 1 to 7. A new Butler Street entrance to platforms was opened in 2017, designed by AHR, and on account of its inept design and confusing and awkward changes of level was short-listed for the annual Carbuncle Cup, awarded UK-wide for architectural bloopers.

Some of the station's heritage can still be seen:

- At the far north end of platform 4 are the remains of the Ladywell Sidings, most of which was lifted to make way for a ring road which was built in the 1990s.
- At the north end of platform 3, a disused bay platform can be seen. It follows the original alignment of the main platform before the 1903 expansion.
- There is a tunnel between platforms 3 and 4, under the station approach. Locomotives and trains are occasionally stored there.
- At the north of platform 7 is the blocked up remains of the tunnel which took the platform 13 (originally number 10) through-line from the north, under the Butler Street entrance.
- At the southern end of platform 7, the platform edge curves away to the east but the line now turns westward to join the main line.
- The former platforms 1 and 2 are also still in existence, but closed to passengers, and was used formerly used Royal Mail Parcelforce services. Old platform 1 and the lines to its west have been broken to form two bay platforms. Network Rail has its offices here.

=== Electrification ===
In 1970, approval was given to electrify the rest of the West Coast Main Line from Weaver Junction through Preston to Glasgow Central. Electric trains began serving Preston in 1973. This was accompanied by new signals on the line and a power signal box was constructed north of the station close by Fylde Junction. An electrification over run also took place at this junction to facilitate electrification to Blackpool at a later date, although it would be over forty years before the line was electrified.

=== Special features ===
A free buffet for servicemen was provided at the station during both World Wars. The Preston Station Free Buffet Association served free hot drinks, biscuits and buns and sold sandwiches at cost price to anyone in uniform 24 hours a day for the duration of the First World War. Four hundred women working 12-hour shifts served over 3 million men between 1915 and 1919. 12 million cups of tea were served between 1939 and 1945. It was funded by subscription and had its own marked crockery. The station was on a major north–south route for troops. There are three commemorative plaques related to the First World War buffet in the waiting room on platforms 3 and 4, the former site of WWI buffet. One of the drama segments of the televised Preston Passion of 2012 was set in the First World War servicemen's buffet. The Second World War buffet was located in the southern building further down platforms 5 and 6 (now platforms 3 and 4).

One of the catenary stanchions on platform 4 is notably better-kept than others; it carries a small plaque detailing the visit of Queen Elizabeth II on 7 May 1974, after the completion of electrification of tracks north of the point where it stands. This was significant because it marked the completion of the total electrification of the West Coast Main Line.

=== Accidents and incidents ===
- On 1 October 1831, some wagons ran away on an inclined plane, worked by a stationary steam engine, at Avenhambrow. The brakesman jumped off but was run over and killed by wagons being drawn up the incline on an adjacent line.
- On 17 August 1845, two passenger trains collided due to one of them having insufficient brakes and passing a signal at danger. Some passengers sustained slight injuries.
- On 16 September 1854, a passenger train collided with some wagons on the line near Preston due to a pointsman's error and his lack of training. Some passengers were injured.
- On 23 July 1855, a passenger was run down and killed by a train whilst crossing the tracks at Preston, no footbridge then being provided.
- On 4 October 1856, a passenger train collided with an empty stock train that was being shunted and had derailed south of Preston due to a pointsman's error.
- On 25 September 1858, a passenger train and a freight train were in a head-on collision near Preston due to the passenger train passing a signal at danger. Two passengers were injured.
- On 26 January 1866, a passenger train collided with some wagons that were being shunted.
- On 8 November 1866, a light engine collided with a freight train near Preston. Both trains were derailed.
- On 18 April 1870, an excursion train collided with a freight train due to a pointsman's error. There were no injuries.
- On 5 February 1871, a cattle train was in a head-on collision with a light engine and was derailed. There were no injuries.
- On 23 November 1871, a passenger train and a freight train collided at Water Lane Junction. One person was killed and fifteen people were injured, twelve seriously.
- On 22 May 1872, a banking engine ran into the rear of the passenger train it had been sent to assist. Seven people were slightly injured.
- On 18 July 1872, two passenger trains collided due to a pointsman's error. A few passengers were slightly injured.
- On 17 April 1873, a passenger train collided with some wagons that were being shunted on the main line. Ten passengers were injured.
- On 7 November 1873, a freight train ran away and collided with some wagons that were being shunted and was derailed.
- On 5 September 1874, collision a passenger train overran signals and ran into the rear of a luggage train. Seven people were injured.
- On 14 December 1880, a passenger train overran signals and ran into the rear of a freight train south of Preston. Four people were slightly injured.
- On 5 February 1881, an express passenger train ran into a rake of wagons on the line. Several passengers were slightly injured.
- On 25 April 1882, Detective Constable George Holland of the Lancashire & Yorkshire Railway Police was crossing railway lines at Butler Street goods yard, adjacent to Preston Railway Station when he was struck and killed by wagons being loose-shunted.
- On 17 October 1885, a passenger train overran signals and collided with a light engine. One person was seriously injured, several sustained slight injuries.
- On 21 April 1888, an express passenger train collided with some carriages that were being shunted; both trains were derailed. One passenger was injured.
- On 21 January 1892, a locomotive ran into the rear of a stationary passenger train due to a signalman's error.
- On 23 July 1892, an express passenger train ran into the rear of another due to a signalman's error. Thirteen passengers were injured.
- On 1 June 1895, an excursion train overran signals and ran into the rear of another excursion train. Seventeen people were injured.
- On 27 October 1895, an express passenger train, hauled by LNWR Renewed Precedent Class 2-4-0 no. 790 Hardwicke, collided with a freight train due to the driver of the freight misreading signals.
- On 13 July 1896, an express passenger train was derailed due to excessive speed. One person was killed.
- On 1 August 1903, an express passenger train ran into the rear of a passenger train due to an error by the driver of the express. One person was killed and 78 were injured.
- On 16 August 1903, a passenger train ran into the rear of another due to a signalman's error. Sixteen passengers were injured.
- On 4 February 1908, a light engine was in a sidelong collision with a passenger train due to a signalman's error. Seven passengers were injured.
- On 4 October 1912, a passenger train overran signals and was in a rear-end collision with an express train. Twenty-six people were injured.
- On 21 July 1919, a light engine ran into the rear of a passenger train due to an error by the driver of the light engine. About 20 people were injured.
- On 16 January 1920, a freight train collided with a light engine near Preston due to errors by the driver of the light engine and a signalman.
- On 27 August 1920, an express passenger train collided with a van at Preston. There were no injuries.
- On 11 February 1929, two locomotives collided whilst shunting. Two people were injured.
- On 12 October 1931, a passenger train was derailed due to a set of points moving under it as it traversed them. Twenty two people were injured. A signal displaying a false "clear" aspect due to a fault was a major contributory factor.
- On 22 September 1934, an excursion train was in a rear-end collision with a passenger train near Preston. The locomotive of the excursion train was derailed. One person was injured.
- On 16 January 1958, a passenger train collided with a light engine which was standing foul of the line and was derailed. The light engine ended up on its side. Thirteen people were injured. A signalman was blamed for the accident as he failed to ensure that the line was clear for the passenger train.
- On 18 January 1986, a Class 104 diesel multiple unit suffered a brake failure, passed three signals at danger and collided with a Class 47 diesel-electric locomotive near Preston. Forty-four people were injured.
- On 1 April 2017, a passenger train operated by a Class 158 diesel multiple unit from York collided with the buffer stops at a speed of 6 mph (9.7 km/h) on arrival; fifteen people were injured. The cause was driver error.

== Layout and facilities ==
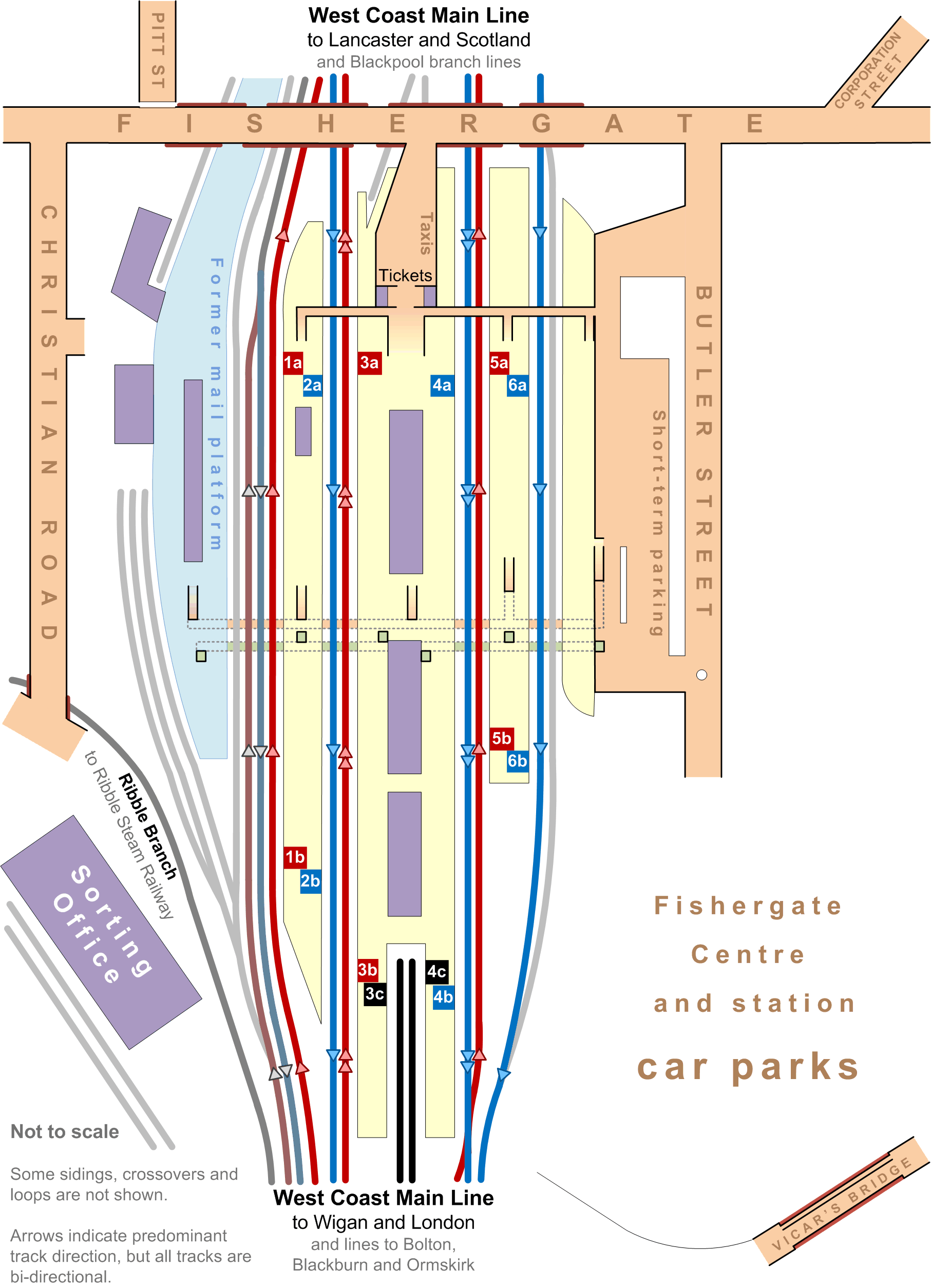
Layout of the station in 2008

The main entrance to the station is at the bottom of the station approach, a ramp off the bridge that carries Fishergate over the railway. The ticket office is located within the small concourse, which provides direct access, down the ramp, to the inter-city platforms 3 and 4. There are footbridges on either side of this ramp to all other platforms. The eastern footbridge ends at an alternative entrance to the station on Butler Street, giving closer access to Preston city centre and the station car park, with 1,001 spaces. There are two subways, one of which provides step-free access to all but one platforms in use at the station; the second, adjacent to the passenger subway, was formerly a freight subway and only had access by staff operated freight lifts; these were converted to passenger operated lifts in the 1990s, giving full step-free access to all platforms for wheelchairs, trolleys and pushchairs. There is another entrance serving the station car park at the south end of platform 7.

There are currently six through and two bay platforms in use at Preston, with two more available for emergency use. The island forming platforms 3 and 4 is a very wide island, with a long series of buildings. Inside these buildings are services and amenities such as a newsagent and several food outlets, including a licensed restaurant. There are also toilets and a large waiting room. A small travel centre on platform 3, near the ramp, is operated by Avanti West Coast staff to give information for passengers on the platform. In addition to these main amenities, there is a small coffee shop outlet on platform 4, as well as an additional shop on platforms 1 and 2.

Passenger information systems were updated during 2007 and now use dot matrix display screens. Preston retained a manual Tannoy system until 30 January 2017, a rarity amongst the larger stations in the UK. An automated announcement system was introduced. In 2009, the station was identified as one of the ten worst category B interchange stations for mystery shopper assessment of fabric and environment, and was set to receive a share of £50 million funding for improvements prior to a public spending review initiated in 2010.

== Services ==
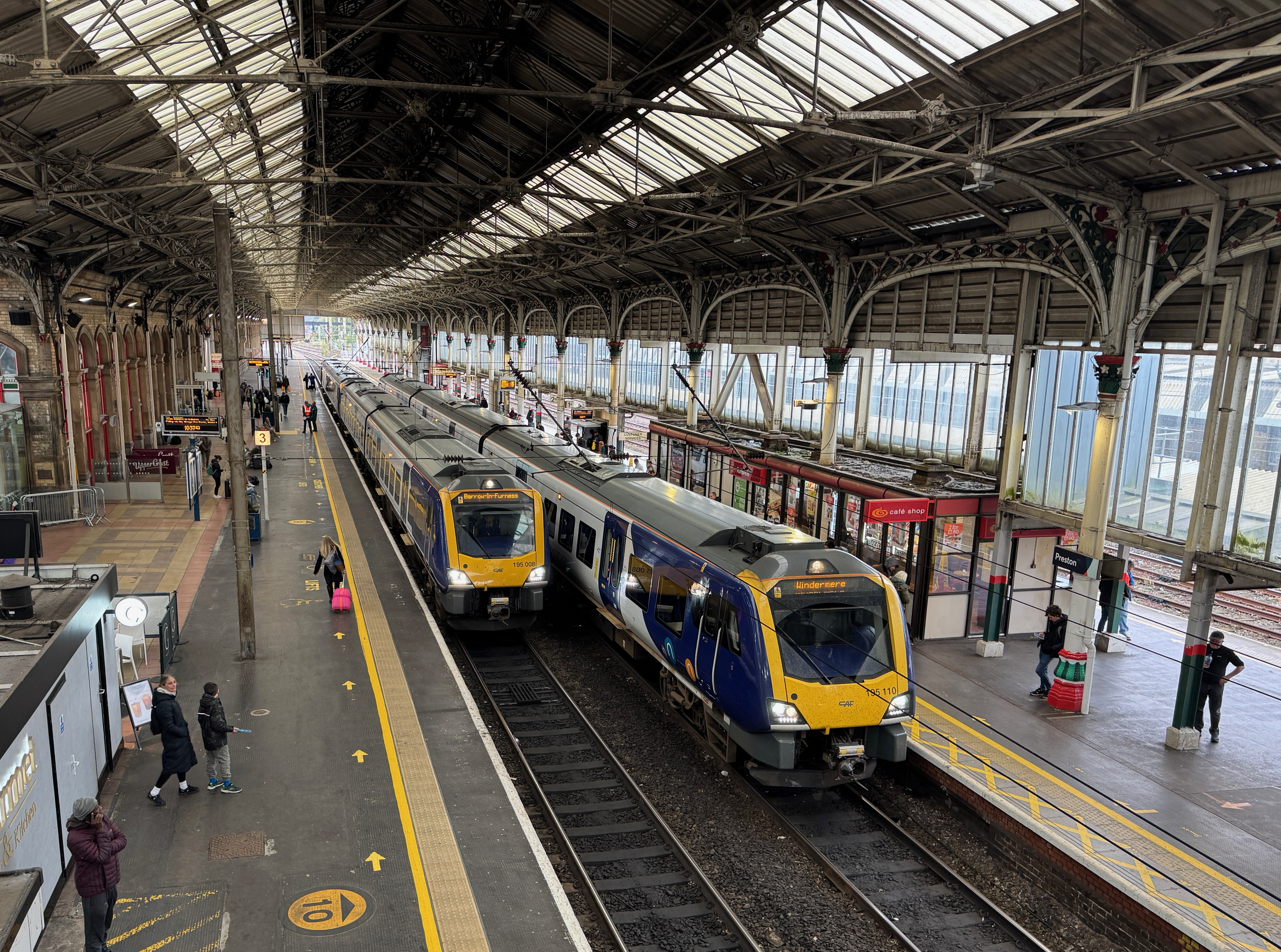
Two Northern Trains Class 195s at platforms 2 and 3, looking south

The station is served by five train operating companies, with general off-peak service patterns in trains per hour/day (tph/tpd):

Avanti West Coast:

- 3 tp2h to Glasgow Central
- 1 tp2h to Edinburgh Waverley
- 2 tph to London Euston; of which:
  - 1 tph travels via the Trent Valley line
  - 1 tph via the Birmingham loop.

Caledonian Sleeper:

- 1 tpd to London Euston
- 1 tpd to Edinburgh Waverley, which then splits to serve Aberdeen, Fort William and Inverness.

Northern Trains:

- 4 tph to Blackpool North
- 1 tph to Blackpool South
- 1 tph to Liverpool Lime Street
- 1 tph to York, via Leeds
- 3 tph to Manchester Airport, via Chorley
- 1 tph to Barrow-in-Furness (11 tpd) or Windermere (4 tpd)
- 1 tph to Colne
- 1 tph to Ormskirk
- 1 tpd to Carlisle, via Whitehaven.

TransPennine Express:

- 1 tph to Manchester Airport
- 1 tph to Glasgow Central or Edinburgh Waverley (alternately)
- 2 tpd to Liverpool Lime Street.

Lumo:

- 5 tpd to London Euston
- 4 tpd to Stirling

Preceding station	National Rail	Following station
Lancaster	Avanti West Coast West Coast Main Line	Wigan North Western
Blackpool North	Avanti West Coast West Coast Main Line	Wigan North Western
Kirkham and Wesham Limited service	Avanti West Coast West Coast Main Line	Wigan North Western
Lancaster	TransPennine Express Anglo-Scottish Route	Bolton
Lancaster	TransPennine Express Anglo-Scottish Route	Wigan North Western
Lancaster	Northern Trains Windermere / Barrow-in-Furness to Manchester Airport	Chorley
Poulton-le-Fylde	Northern Trains Blackpool North to Manchester Airport	Leyland
Kirkham and Wesham	Northern Trains Blackpool North to Manchester Airport	Leyland
Poulton-le-Fylde	Northern Trains Blackpool North to Liverpool Lime Street	Leyland
Kirkham and Wesham Sundays only	Northern Trains Blackpool North to Liverpool Lime Street	Leyland
Kirkham and Wesham	Northern Trains Blackpool South branch line	Terminus
Salwick Limited service	Northern Trains Blackpool South branch line	Terminus
Kirkham and Wesham Monday to Saturday	Northern Trains York to Blackpool North	Blackburn
Poulton-le-Fylde	Northern Trains York to Blackpool North	Blackburn
Terminus	Northern Trains East Lancashire line	Lostock Hall
Terminus	Northern Trains Ormskirk branch line	Croston
Edinburgh Waverley	Caledonian Sleeper Highland Sleeper	Crewe
Carlisle	Lumo; London Euston to Stirling	Crewe
	Historical railways	
Lea Road	Preston and Wyre; Joint Railway	Terminus
Terminus	North Union Railway	Farington
Oxheys	London and North Western Railway; Lancaster and Preston Junction Railway	Terminus
	Disused railways	
Terminus	West Lancashire Railway	Penwortham; Cop Lane
Deepdale	Preston and Longridge Railway	Terminus
Terminus	East Lancashire Railway; Blackburn and Preston Railway & L'pool, Ormskirk & Preston Rly	Preston Junction

== Proposed services ==
In 2017, Liverpool City Region Combined Authority communicated its intention to introduce new battery trains, with view to putting Preston onto the Merseyrail network by extending the Northern Line from Ormskirk to Preston. It stated that "the potential use of battery powered Merseyrail units may improve the business case."

== In popular culture ==
The autobiographical song "Cheap Day Return", on the Jethro Tull album Aqualung (1971), is set on the Preston platform, a transfer stop on the return leg of a trip from London to Blackpool.

== See also ==
- Listed buildings in Preston, Lancashire
