= Liverpool, Ormskirk and Preston Railway =

Railway line in England

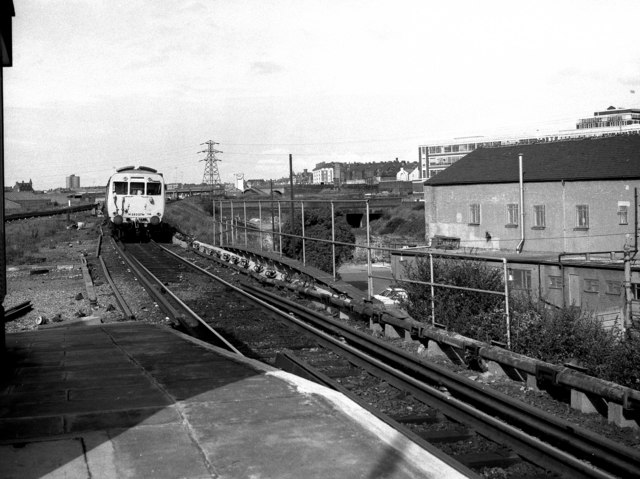
- Approaching Sandhills from the north.

Overview
- Status: Operational (as two separate lines)
- Owner: Network Rail
- Locale: Lancashire; North West England

Service
- System: National Rail
- Operator: Northern

Technical
- Track gauge: 1,435 mm (4 ft 8 1/2 in) standard gauge

Liverpool, Ormskirk, and Preston Railway Act 1846
- Act of Parliament
- Parliament of the United Kingdom
- Long title: An Act for making a Railway from the Liverpool and Bury Railway to the North Union and Blackburn and Preston Railways, with Branches therefrom, to be called "The Liverpool, Ormskirk, and Preston Railway."
- Citation: 9 & 10 Vict. c. ccclxxxi

Dates
- Royal assent: 18 August 1846

Text of statute as originally enacted

The Liverpool, Ormskirk and Preston Railway in north-west England was formed in 1846 by the Liverpool, Ormskirk, and Preston Railway Act 1846 (9 & 10 Vict. c. ccclxxxi). The act allowed it to be purchased by the East Lancashire Railway (ELR), which happened the following year. The line opened to traffic on 2 April 1849.

The railway ran from a junction with the Liverpool and Bury Railway near Walton northwards via Ormskirk to a west-facing junction with the Blackburn and Preston Railway just east of Lostock Hall. Documents from 1847 signed by Joseph Locke, Sturges Meek and Mackenzie, Brassey & Stephenson show elevations, plans and sections for bridges on line. A direct route to Preston from Lostock Hall was opened on 2 September 1850 and a branch line from Ormskirk to Rainford Junction via Skelmersdale on 1 March 1858.

From May 1859, it became part of the Lancashire and Yorkshire Railway (L&YR) system, following the ELR's absorption by that company. Under L&YR ownership, it became the company's main line from Liverpool to Preston and East Lancashire and carried through express trains to Blackpool and Scotland via Blackburn, Hellifield and the Settle-Carlisle Line as well as significant quantities of freight to the docks in Liverpool. From 1891, it was linked directly to the West Coast Main Line by a new connection near Farington built as part of the work to upgrade that part of the route to four tracks. The southern end of the route was subsequently electrified by the L&YR in stages between 1906 (as far as Aintree) and 1913 (through to Ormskirk).

Today the line still operates, though through services between Liverpool and Preston/East Lancashire were withdrawn in 1969/70. The section between Liverpool and Ormskirk forms part of Merseyrail's Northern Line and the section between Ormskirk and Preston forming Northern's Ormskirk Branch Line. The two sections meet at Ormskirk station on the same alignment but are now separated by buffers in a rare type of cross-platform interchange.

== Connections to other railways ==
- Liverpool and Bury Railway at Walton (section from here to Liverpool Exchange was under joint ownership)
- North Mersey Branch and the North Liverpool Extension Line at Aintree
- Manchester and Southport Railway at Burscough Junction (the Burscough Curves)
- East Lancashire Line at Lostock Hall
