= Ormskirk branch line =

Railway line in Lancashire, England

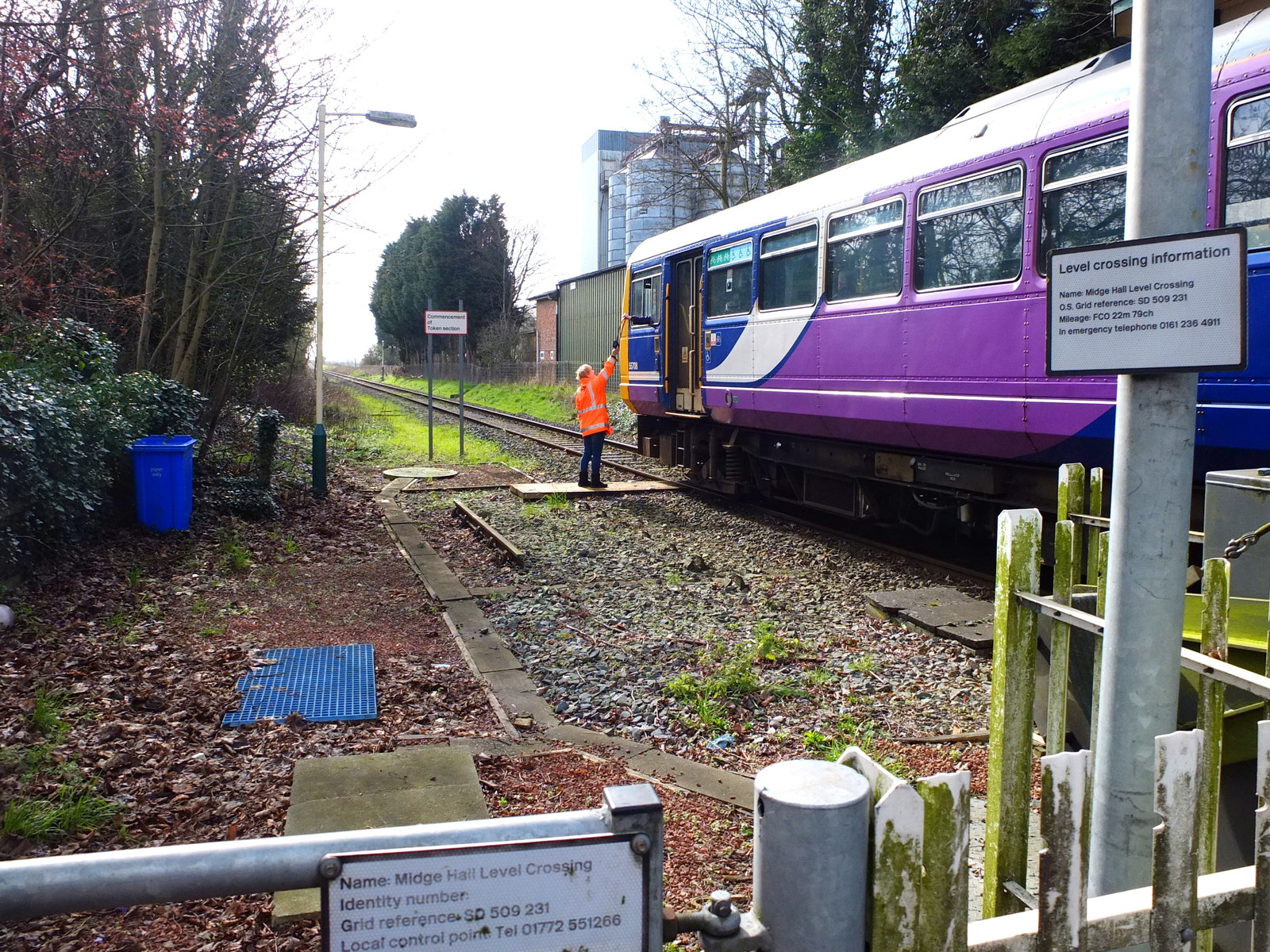
- Exchanging the token at Midge Hall level crossing

Overview
- Status: Operational
- Owner: Network Rail
- Locale: Lancashire; North West England

Service
- System: National Rail
- Operator(s): Northern Trains

Technical
- Track gauge: 4 ft 8 1/2 in (1,435 mm) standard gauge
Route map
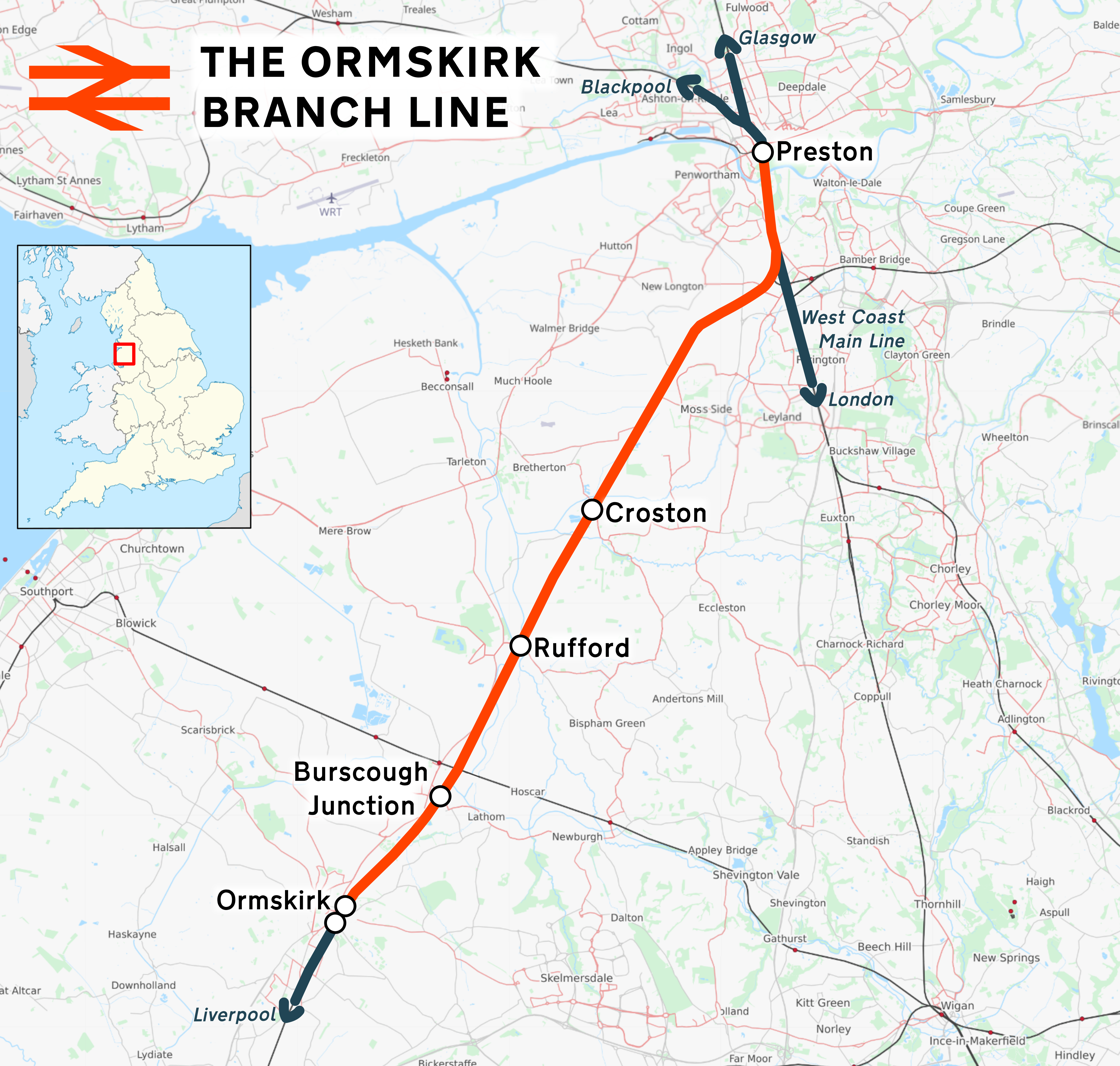
(Click to expand)

The Ormskirk branch line is a railway line in Lancashire, England, running between Preston and Ormskirk. The train service is operated by Northern Trains, who usually operate Class 150 and Class 156, units.The line is the northern section of the former Liverpool, Ormskirk and Preston Railway; the line from Ormskirk to Liverpool is now part of Merseyrail's Northern Line. Prior to the introduction of the 1970–71 London Midland Region timetable, it was a secondary main line from Liverpool to Scotland, Blackpool, and Yorkshire. From 4 May 1970, however, the line was severed at Ormskirk. With express trains eliminated, stopping services at the village stations en route were improved, and have retained a similar frequency to this day.

== Signalling ==
The line is controlled by Preston Power Signal Box (PSB) from where it leaves the West Coast Main Line at Farington Curve Jn by Track Circuit Block signalling regulations until Midge Hall signal box. From here until Rufford signal box, the trains are signalled by Electric Token Block regulations, and from Rufford to Ormskirk the train is signalled by One Train Working (No Staff) regulations (previously worked as One Train Working With Train Staff until 2016). If at any time there is a problem with either the token machine or track circuits showing occupied, then pilotman working must be implemented.

== History ==
The line remained an important passenger artery into the 1960s, though freight had begun to disappear – the goods yards at Croston and Rufford closed around 1964, though that at Ormskirk remained active until 1969. Stopping passenger services were handed over to DMUs from the end of October 1965.

In 1969, the Labour Minister of Transport Richard Marsh refused to agree to British Railways request to withdraw local passenger services between Ormskirk and Preston, and to close the stations at Burscough Junction, Rufford and Croston. The price for the reprieve of the intermediate stations though, was the line's future as a main line. From October 1969 stopping trains from Blackpool and Preston terminated at Ormskirk, and the last through trains from Liverpool to Preston ran on 3 May 1970. Services to and from East Lancashire via Lostock Hall and Blackburn were also withdrawn from 6 October 1969, when the original LO&PR line via Moss Lane Junction and the curve hence to Todd Lane Junction closed to passenger traffic. All services henceforth ran via Farington Curve Junction and the WCML to reach Preston. The line was then singled with the removal of the old Down Main between Midge Hall and Ormskirk in the summer of 1970, and from Midge Hall to Preston in 1983.

== Future ==
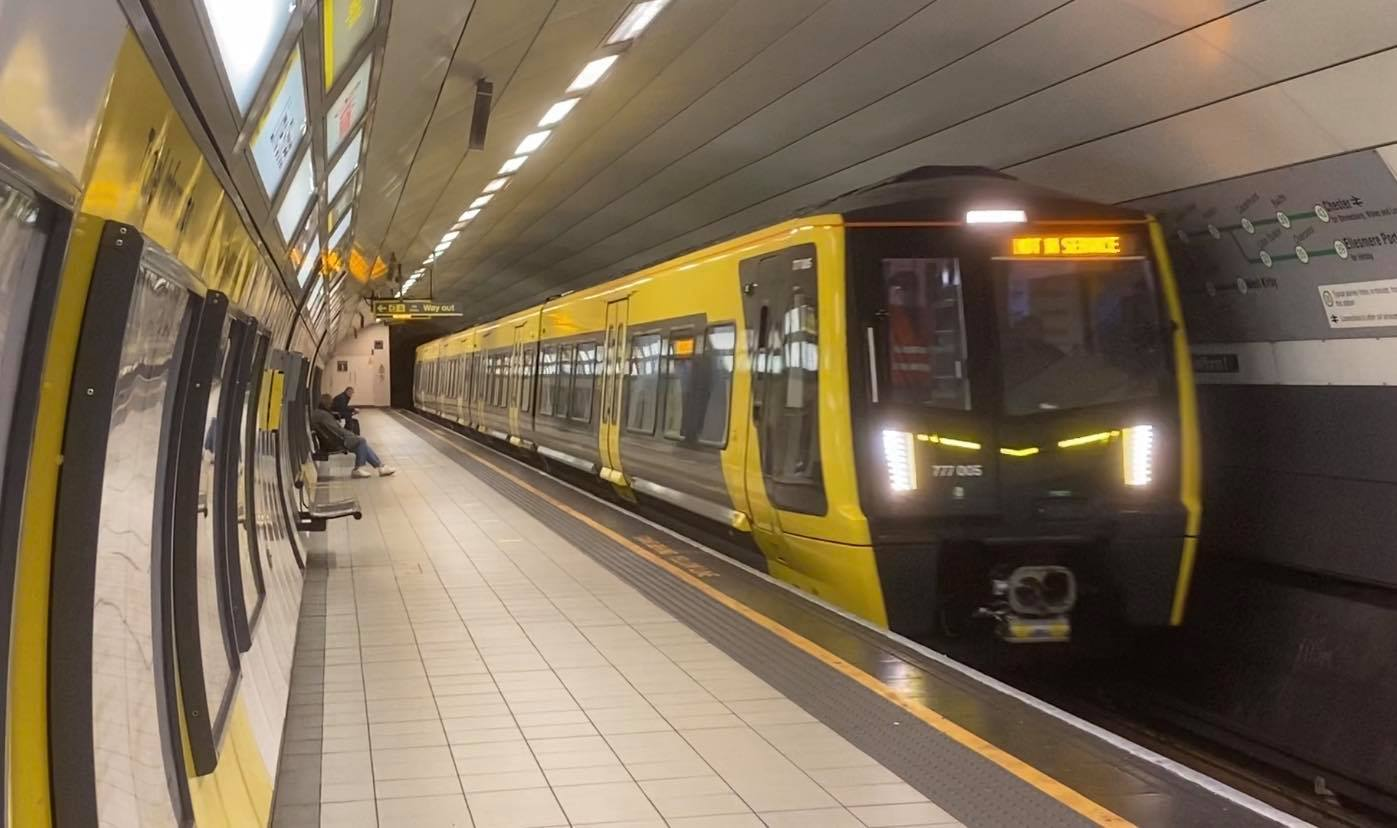
Class 777, Stadler, conducted battery-electric trials in Liverpool.

The Liverpool City Region Combined Authority announced in July 2021 that trials of a BEMU version their new Class 777 on the Merseyrail network had shown that they were capable of travelling up to 20 miles (32 km) without a charge. The battery-electric version of the Class 777 would allow the possibility of Merseyrail services from Liverpool to Skelmersdale, Wrexham, Warrington, Preston and Runcorn, without full line electrification.

The reinstatement of the Burscough Curves has been proposed which would allow services to Southport from Preston and Liverpool via Ormskirk. This could be accompanied by the reopening of Midge Hall station.

Preston – Ormskirk services were increased to hourly all day in May 2018 (apart from Sundays).
