= Lostock Hall railway station =

Railway station in South Ribble, Lancashire, England

Coordinates: 53.724°N 2.687°W

Lostock Hall
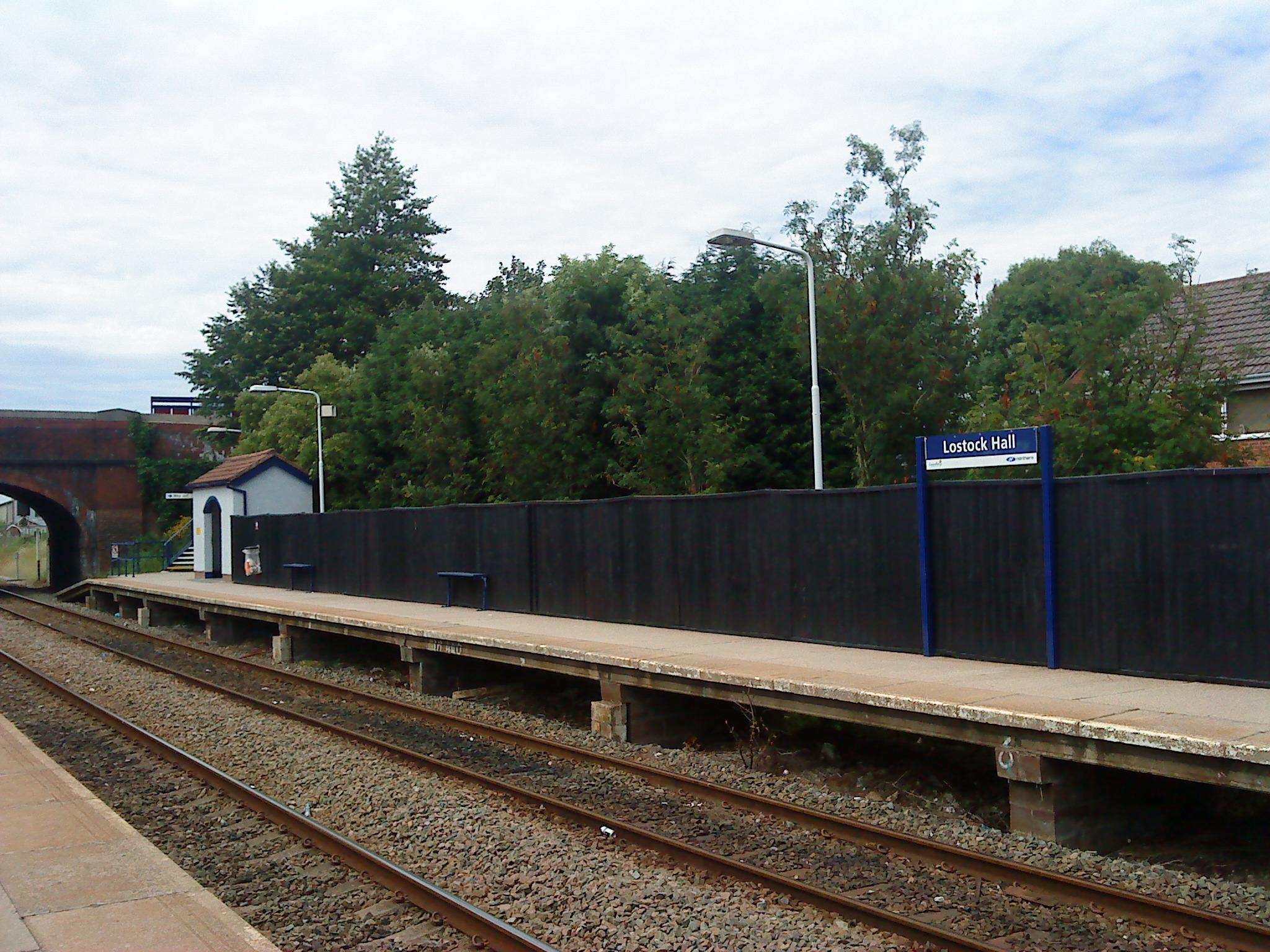
- Lostock Hall railway station in 2009

General information
- Location: Lostock Hall, South Ribble; England
- Grid reference: SD547255
- Manager: Northern Trains
- Platforms: 2

Other information
- Station code: LOH
- Classification: DfT category F2

Key dates
- 1846: first station opened
- 6 October 1969: closed
- May 1984: present station opened

Passengers
- 2021/22: ▲24,042
- 2022/23: ▲25,434
- 2023/24: ▼22,308
- 2024/25: ▲24,366
- 2025/26: ▲30,666
Location
Notes
- Passenger statistics from the Office of Rail and Road

Lostock Hall railway station is a railway station serving the village of Lostock Hall in the South Ribble borough of Lancashire, England. It is on the East Lancashire Line and is managed by Northern Trains, who also provide all passenger trains serving it.

== History ==
The first railway in the area was the Blackburn & Preston Railway, which opened its route from Blackburn to Farington Junction (on the North Union Railway, 3 miles south of Preston) in June 1846. The company was almost immediately taken over by the ambitious East Lancashire Railway, which was undergoing a rapid expansion of its network of routes in the area. The ELR encountered problems almost from the outset over the use of the NUR route between Farington and Preston, with congestion and the high tolls charged by the latter company for access to its metals causing considerable friction between the two. The ELR sought parliamentary permission to build its own route to Preston to resolve this issue, which was granted in 1848 despite initial opposition from Preston Corporation. The following year saw the arrival from the west of the Liverpool, Ormskirk and Preston Railway, which had received parliamentary assent in 1846 but had been bought out by the ELR before construction work had started upon it. This route gave the ELR direct access for its traffic to the docks in Liverpool and joined the B&PR at Lostock Hall by means of a junction facing towards Blackburn. A station was built on this line a short distance to the west of the junction (adjacent to the bridge carrying the main Preston to Wigan across the railway) to serve Lostock Hall village, which had by this time been chosen by the ELR as the site for one its main locomotive depots.

The ELR Preston Extension was finally opened to traffic on 2 September 1850 - this left the original B&PR line at a triangular junction just east of Lostock Hall and ran roughly parallel to the NUR en route to new platforms alongside the latter's station, with a connection to the main line beyond. Thereafter, the old B&P line between Lostock Hall Junction and Farington was rendered redundant before being closed - not seeing regular traffic again until the mid-1880s. Services from the station ran to Liverpool Exchange westbound and to both Preston and Blackburn (with some extensions through to Colne) eastbound. Traffic levels continued to increase in subsequent years, particularly after the ELR's absorption by the Lancashire and Yorkshire Railway in May 1859 - the L&Y then routing significant quantities of trans-Pennine freight over the route to the port of Liverpool.

By 1877 traffic demands had reached the point that the 2-road depot adjacent to the junction was deemed inadequate by the L&Y and work on a new, much larger facility began. This was built on a site between the LO&P and B&P lines immediately south of the passenger station and was opened in 1881, with the old depot then becoming a carriage and wagon repair shop. The new shed would become the L&Y's main loco servicing facility for the entire Preston area (and beyond) and in due course the volume of traffic utilising it and the routes it served became so great that additional trackwork improvements had to be made to alleviate matters. These began with the re-opening of the Farington line in 1886, with the junction there altered to face south rather than north as previously, followed by the construction of two new connections between the East Lancs line and the newly quadrupled (and by now jointly owned) main line from Wigan north of where the two lines crossed each other. The first of these (from west to north) was commissioned in 1891 as part of the main line upgrade works, whilst the second (east to north) followed in May 1908, creating a second triangular junction to the west of the station and a second route to Preston. This complex network of lines allowed for considerable operational flexibility in the years that followed, as both full trains and light locomotives could be routed from there towards either side of Preston station without conflicting with the main line. It was also possible for trains from the north heading towards Blackpool or vice versa to be routed through Lostock Hall to avoid the need for an awkward and time-consuming reversal manoeuvre at Preston station and this became a regular feature of the timetable at peak times during the summer months right up until the closure of the East Lancs side of Preston station in 1972.

The lines would pass briefly into the hands of the London and North Western Railway from January 1922, before the 1923 Grouping saw the London, Midland and Scottish Railway take over. The station and depot then became part of the London Midland Region area of British Railways upon nationalisation in January 1948.

By the 1960s, the loco shed was still a busy location and would remain so right up until the end of steam on the UK rail network in August 1968. The station and LO&PR line by contrast were amongst those planned for closure in the 1963 Beeching Report, the route being considered by Beeching as a duplicate to that via Wigan and St Helens. Public opposition to the plans soon led to the southern portion as far as Ormskirk being safeguarded, but it was not until 1969 that the rest of the line was reprieved by the Labour government of Harold Wilson. Lostock Hall station though was not so fortunate, losing its passenger services on 6 October 1969 when the last few through trains between Blackburn and Liverpool were withdrawn and the other services on the Ormskirk line routed via Farington Curve Junction and the WCML. The connections either side of Lostock Hall toward Todd Lane Jcn (Preston ELR) and Moss Lane Jcn (Ormskirk) were closed at the same time and subsequently dismantled, whilst the station itself was also demolished at some point in the early 1970s.

Services over the ex-ELR Preston extension from the Bamber Bridge direction finally ended in the autumn of 1972, when the line was closed (as a result of the Preston area re-signalling scheme) along with the remaining manual signal boxes in the area (though a short section remained in use for freight to Lostock Hall gas works until 1977). East Lancashire line trains were thereafter routed via the original 1846/49 lines as far as Lostock Hall, then over the 1908 connection to reach the WCML.

The loco depot eventually lost its role as a maintenance facility in 1971, thereafter taking over the role of its predecessor further east as the area carriage and wagon repair shops. It closed altogether in 1988 and was finally demolished in January 1990. The adjacent Lostock Hall Jcn to Farington Jcn line (which has not had a timetabled passenger service since 1850) is still open and sees use by a variety of freight services heading to and from the S&C route and occasional diverted passenger trains and railtours. Part of the old Preston extension route is now a footpath and cycle way, whilst another portion has been utilised for road improvements.

== The current station ==
By the early 1980s, local pressure for a station to serve the Lostock Hall area had become considerable and so on 14 May 1984 a new station was opened on the opposite side of the Watkin Lane bridge by British Rail with financial backing from Lancashire County Council.

The new facility was (and still is) quite basic – there are waiting shelters, a long-line P.A system and passenger information screens on each concrete platform. Step-free access is available to both platforms.

As of January 2018 along with other stations on this line, a modern touch screen ticket machine was added to the Station.

== Services ==
Monday to Saturdays, there is an hourly service from Lostock Hall towards Preston westbound and Blackburn, Burnley and Colne eastbound. There is a two-hourly service in each direction on Sundays, with through running to Blackpool South. In addition there are two additional morning peak services from York and Leeds to Preston that call here, and one extra service in the evening in the opposite direction to Blackburn and York.

Direct bus services between Chorley, Leyland and Preston and beyond run through Lostock Hall on a much more frequent service.

Preceding station	National Rail	Following station
Preston	Northern Trains East Lancashire Line	Bamber Bridge
