= Burscough Curves =

Coordinates: 53.604823°N 2.838668°W

Overview
- Status: Closed
- Locale: Lancashire

History
- Closed: July 1969

Technical
- Track gauge: 4 ft 8 1/2 in (1,435 mm) standard gauge

The Burscough Curves were railway curves in Lancashire, England, that connected the Ormskirk branch line with the Manchester–Southport line. They formed a vital link for passengers and freight between Southport, Preston, and Ormskirk. The curves were gradually closed and lifted between the 1960s and early 1980s as part of nationwide rail restructuring.

== History ==
During the rail restructuring of the 1960s and 1970s, the "Burscough Curves", which formed a link between the Ormskirk-Preston and Southport-Wigan lines were removed, although the formation survives. The North Curve was taken out of use and severed in July 1969, being lifted in 1973: it was last used for a Saturdays only empty train from Blackpool to Southport. The South Curve was singled in 1970, but remained in use to serve the extensive sidings at the MOD depot located just to the north of Burscough Junction station. It saw its last train in 1982.

The passenger service from Ormskirk to Burscough Junction and on to Southport, which used the southern curve, was withdrawn in 1962, as shown in the British Rail London Midland Region Timetable of that year.

== Re-opening proposals ==
Over the years there have been several proposals and pushes to reinstate the curve, but neither Network Rail nor the Department for Transport have approved the plans to date.

Various schemes have been proposed, including the full electrification of the line from Southport via Burscough to Ormskirk using the same third rail system as Merseyrail. This proposal would allow users of the Ormskirk branch of Merseyrail's Northern Line to reach Southport without having to travel via Sandhills.

In 2008 a Route Utilisation Strategy by Network Rail suggests there is support for re-opening the curve.

In June 2009, the Association of Train Operating Companies, in its Connecting Communities: Expanding Access to the Rail Network report, called for funding for the reopening of this line as part of a £500m scheme to open 33 stations on 14 lines closed in the Beeching Axe, including seven new parkway stations. The uses of the curves in a new service pattern has been identified by Network Rail, if electrified along with the through lines.

Additionally, Network Rail has identified electrification of Wigan to Southport, together with the Ormskirk–Preston Line and the Burscough Curves as a possible source of new services.

In a parliamentary debate on 27 April 2011, the transport minister expressed interest in discussing the curves' reinstatement with former Southport MP John Pugh.

The New Merseyrail Fleet A Platform For Future Innovations document, mentions potential Ormskirk–Preston enhancements, that there is the potential to use battery powered Merseyrail units that may improve the business case for opening the curves. The document states there will be a review after the Merseyrail units have been tested for battery operation in 2020.

The new Class 777 Merseyrail trains, capable of battery electric operation, may be considered for use on the Burscough Curves. Merseytravel's Long Term Strategy puts the opening of the curves in Network Rail's CP7 period.

In March 2020, the MPs for Southport, South Ribble, West Lancs and Preston (Damien Moore, Katherine Fletcher, Rosie Cooper and Sir Mark Hendrick) along with Lancashire County Council leader Geoff Driver united in a bid to pressure Network Rail and the Government to reinstate the curves.

In March 2021 the council made a formal application to the Department for Transport for funding to reopen the curves.

In November 2021 it was announced that the bid for £50,000 to fund a feasibility study was rejected by the Department for Transport.
