= List of railway stations in Lancashire =

Railways in Lancashire
Primary route
Secondary route
Rural route
Goods only
Heritage railway
Light rail/tramway
Disused railway

This is a list of railway stations within the county of Lancashire, a ceremonial county in North West England. It includes all Lancashire railway stations that currently have regular timetabled train services.

The West Coast Main Line provides direct rail links with London and other major cities, with stations at Preston and Lancaster. East-west connections are carried via the East Lancashire Line between Blackpool and Colne via Lytham, Preston, Blackburn, Accrington and Burnley. The Ribble Valley Line runs from Bolton to Clitheroe via Darwen and Blackburn. There are also connecting lines from Preston to Ormskirk and Bolton, and from Lancaster to Morecambe, Heysham and Skipton.

== National Rail stations ==
All Lancashire stations are managed by Northern except for the following:

- By Merseyrail:

- Aughton Park
- Ormskirk
- Town Green

- By Avanti West Coast:

- Lancaster
- Preston

Current information						History	
Name	Code	Local government district	Lines served	Platforms	DfT category	Year opened	Previous names
Accrington	ACR	Hyndburn	Caldervale Line • East Lancashire Line	2	E	1848	—
Adlington (Lancs)	ADL	Chorley	Manchester-Preston Line	2	F2	1841	Adlington
Ansdell and Fairhaven	AFV	Fylde	Blackpool Branch Line (S)	1	F2	1872	Ansdell
Appley Bridge	APB	West Lancashire	Manchester to Southport Line	2	F1	1855	—
Aughton Park	AUG	West Lancashire	Northern Line (Merseyrail)	2	E	1907	Aughton Park Halt
Bamber Bridge	BMB	South Ribble	East Lancashire Line	2	F2	1846	—
Bare Lane	BAR	Lancaster	Leeds to Morecambe Line • Morecambe Branch Line • TransPennine North West	2	F1	1864	Poulton-le-Sands
Bescar Lane	BES	West Lancashire	Manchester to Southport Line	2	F2	1855	—
Blackburn	BBN	Blackburn with Darwen	Buxton Line • Caldervale Line • East Lancashire Line • Ribble Valley Line	4	C1	1846	—
Blackpool North	BPN	Blackpool	Blackpool Branch Line (N) • Blackpool-Liverpool Line • Caldervale Line • TransPennine North West • West Coast Main Line	8	C1	1846	Blackpool Talbot Road • Blackpool
Blackpool Pleasure Beach	BPB	Blackpool	Blackpool Branch Line (S)	1	F1	1987	—
Blackpool South	BPS	Blackpool	Blackpool Branch Line (S)	1	F1	1903	Waterloo Road
Brierfield	BRF	Pendle	East Lancashire Line	1	F2	1849	Marsden
Buckshaw Parkway	BSV	Chorley	Manchester-Preston Line • TransPennine North West	2		2011	—
Burnley Barracks	BUB	Burnley	East Lancashire Line	1	F2	1848	Burnley Westgate
Burnley Central	BNC	Burnley	East Lancashire Line	1	E	1848	Burnley Bank Top • Burnley
Burnley Manchester Road	BYM	Burnley	Caldervale Line	2	F1	1866	—
Burscough Bridge	BCB	West Lancashire	Manchester to Southport Line	2	F1	1855	—
Burscough Junction	BCJ	West Lancashire	Ormskirk Branch Line	1	F2	1849	—
Carnforth	CNF	Lancaster	Furness Line • Leeds to Morecambe Line • TransPennine North West	2	F1	1846	Carnforth-Yealand
Cherry Tree	CYT	Blackburn with Darwen	East Lancashire Line	2	F2	1847	—
Chorley	CRL	Chorley	Manchester-Preston Line • TransPennine North West	2	D	1841	—
Church and Oswaldtwistle	CTW	Hyndburn	East Lancashire Line	2	F2	1848	Church
Clitheroe	CLH	Ribble Valley	Buxton Line • Ribble Valley Line	2	F2	1850	—
Colne	CNE	Pendle	East Lancashire Line	1	F1	1848	—
Croston	CSO	Chorley	Ormskirk Branch Line	1	F2	1849	—
Darwen	DWN	Blackburn with Darwen	Ribble Valley Line	2	F1	1847	Over Darwen
Entwistle	ENT	Blackburn with Darwen	Ribble Valley Line	1	F2	1848	—
Euxton Balshaw Lane	EBA	Chorley	Blackpool-Liverpool Line	2	F2	1905	Balshaw Lane and Euxton
Hapton	HPN	Burnley	East Lancashire Line	2	F2	c. 1860	—
Heysham Port	HHB	Lancaster	Morecambe Branch Line	1	F1	1904	Heysham Sea Terminal • Heysham Harbour
Hoscar	HSC	West Lancashire	Manchester to Southport Line	2	F2	c. 1871	Hoscar Moss
Huncoat	HCT	Hyndburn	East Lancashire Line	2	F2	1848	—
Kirkham and Wesham	KKM	Fylde	Blackpool Branch Line • TransPennine North West • West Coast Main Line	2	E	1840	Kirkham
Lancaster	LAN	Lancaster	Buxton Line • Furness Line • Leeds to Morecambe Line • Morecambe Branch Line • TransPennine North West • West Coast Main Line	5	B	1846	Lancaster Castle
Langho	LHO	Ribble Valley	Ribble Valley Line	2	F2	1850	—
Layton (Lancs)	LAY	Blackpool	Blackpool Branch Line (N)	2	E	1867	Bispham
Leyland	LEY	South Ribble	Blackpool-Liverpool Line • Manchester-Preston Line	4	D	1838	Golden Hill
Lostock Hall	LOH	South Ribble	East Lancashire Line	2	F2	1984	—
Lytham	LTM	Fylde	Blackpool Branch Line (S)	1	F2	1863	—
Mill Hill (Lancs)	MLH	Blackburn with Darwen	East Lancashire Line	2	F2	1884	Mill Hill
Morecambe	MCM	Lancaster	Leeds to Morecambe Line • Morecambe Branch Line • TransPennine North West	2	F1	1994	—
Moss Side	MOS	Fylde	Blackpool Branch Line (S)	1	F2	1846	—
Nelson	NEL	Pendle	East Lancashire Line	1	F1	1849	—
New Lane	NLN	West Lancashire	Manchester to Southport Line	2	F2	1855	—
Ormskirk	OMS	West Lancashire	Northern Line (Merseyrail) • Ormskirk Branch Line	2 (end-to-end)	D	1849	—
Parbold	PBL	West Lancashire	Manchester to Southport Line	2	E	1879	Newburgh • Parbold for Newburgh
Pleasington	PLS	Blackburn with Darwen	East Lancashire Line	2	F2	1846	—
Poulton-le-Fylde	PFY	Wyre	Blackpool Branch Line (N) • Caldervale Line • TransPennine North West • West Coast Main Line	2	E	1840	Poulton
Preston (Lancs)	PRE	Preston	Blackpool Branch Line • Blackpool-Liverpool Line • Buxton Line • Caldervale Line • Caledonian Sleeper • East Lancashire Line • Manchester-Preston Line • Ormskirk Branch Line • TransPennine North West • West Coast Main Line	9	B	1838	Preston • Preston Fishergate
Ramsgreave and Wilpshire	RGW	Blackburn with Darwen	Ribble Valley Line	2	F2	1994	—
Rishton	RIS	Hyndburn	East Lancashire Line	2	F2	1848	—
Rose Grove	RSG	Burnley	East Lancashire Line	2	F1	1848	—
Rufford	RUF	West Lancashire	Ormskirk Branch Line	2	F2	1849	—
Salwick	SLW	Fylde	Blackpool Branch Line (S)	2	F2	1842	Salwick Road
Silverdale	SVR	Lancaster	Furness Line • TransPennine North West	2	F2	1857	Knowllys Hill
Squires Gate	SQU	Fylde	Blackpool Branch Line (S)	1	F2	1931	—
St Annes-on-Sea	SAS	Fylde	Blackpool Branch Line (S)	1	E	1863	St Annes-on-the-Sea • Cross Slack
Town Green	TWN	West Lancashire	Northern Line (Merseyrail)	2	E	1849	Town Green and Aughton
Upholland	UPL	West Lancashire	Kirkby Branch Line	2	F2	1848	Up Holland • Pimbo Lane
Wennington	WNN	Lancaster	Leeds to Morecambe Line	2	F2	1849	—
Whalley (Lancs)	WHE	Ribble Valley	Ribble Valley Line	2	F2	1850	Whalley

== Heritage stations ==
Name	Year opened	Local government district	Heritage railway	Platforms
Irwell Vale	1991	Rossendale	East Lancashire Railway	1
Preston Riverside	2005	Preston	Ribble Steam Railway	1
Rawtenstall	1846	Rossendale	East Lancashire Railway	2

== See also ==
- For other stations within the historic county boundaries of Lancashire (pre-1974) see:
  - List of railway stations in Greater Manchester
  - List of railway stations in Merseyside
- For closed stations see:
  - List of closed railway stations in Lancashire
  - List of closed railway stations in Greater Manchester
  - List of closed railway stations in Merseyside
