= Calder Valley line =

Railway line in northern England

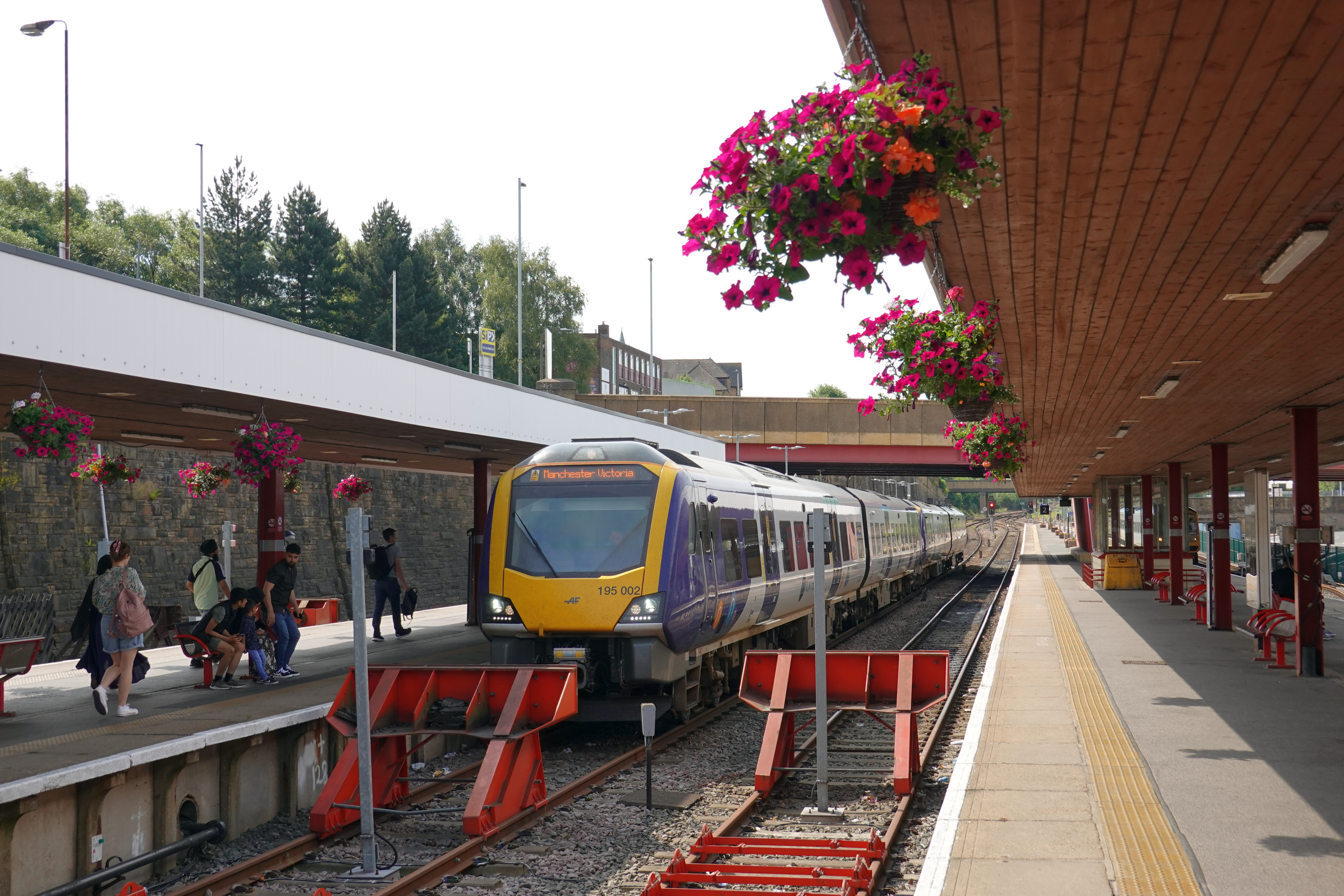
- A Northern Trains Class 195 at Bradford Interchange (2023)

Overview
- Owner: Network Rail
- Locale: West Yorkshire; Greater Manchester; Lancashire
- Termini: Leeds, Manchester Victoria, Blackpool North

Service
- Operator: Northern Trains

Technical
- Num of tracks: 2
- Character: Heavy rail
- Track gauge: 4 ft 8 1/2 in (1,435 mm) standard gauge
Route map
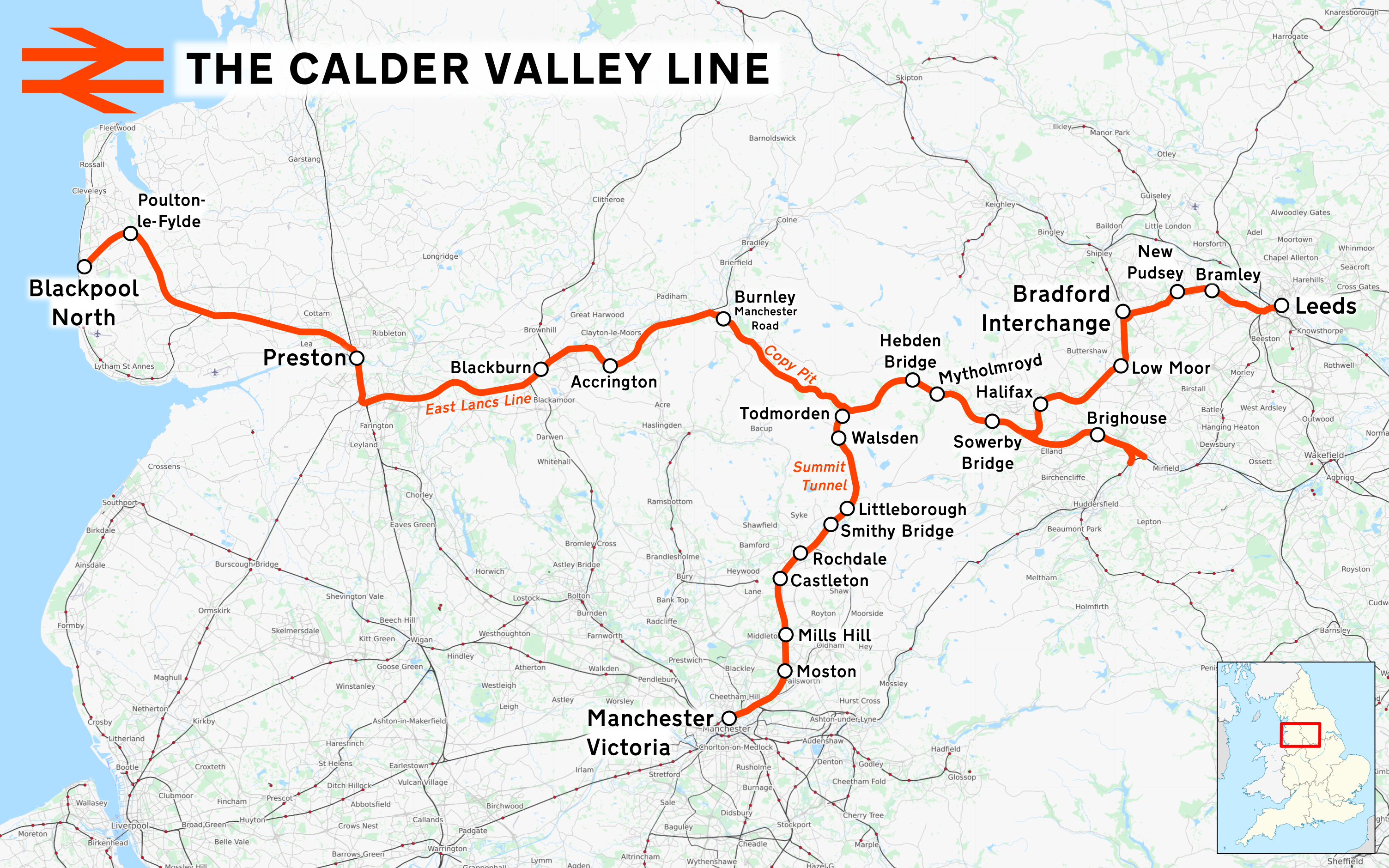
(Click to expand)

The Calder Valley line (also previously known as the Caldervale line) is a railway route in northern England; it connects the large settlements of Leeds, Manchester and Blackpool. It is the slower of the two main railway routes between Leeds and Manchester, (Note: The other is the Huddersfield line.) and is the northernmost of the three main trans-Pennine routes. The line is owned by Network Rail and operated by Northern Trains.

== History ==
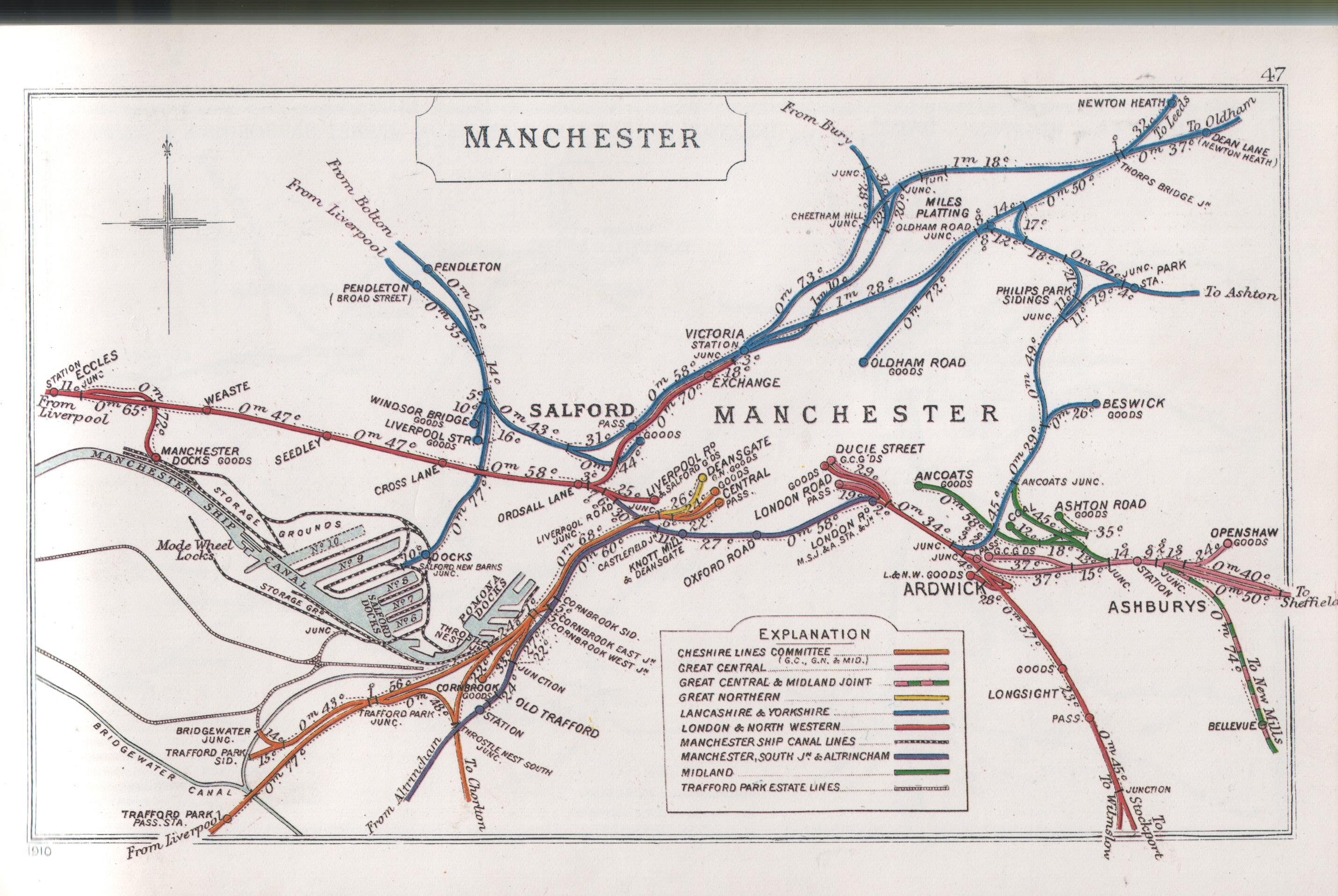
Railway lines around Manchester (1910)

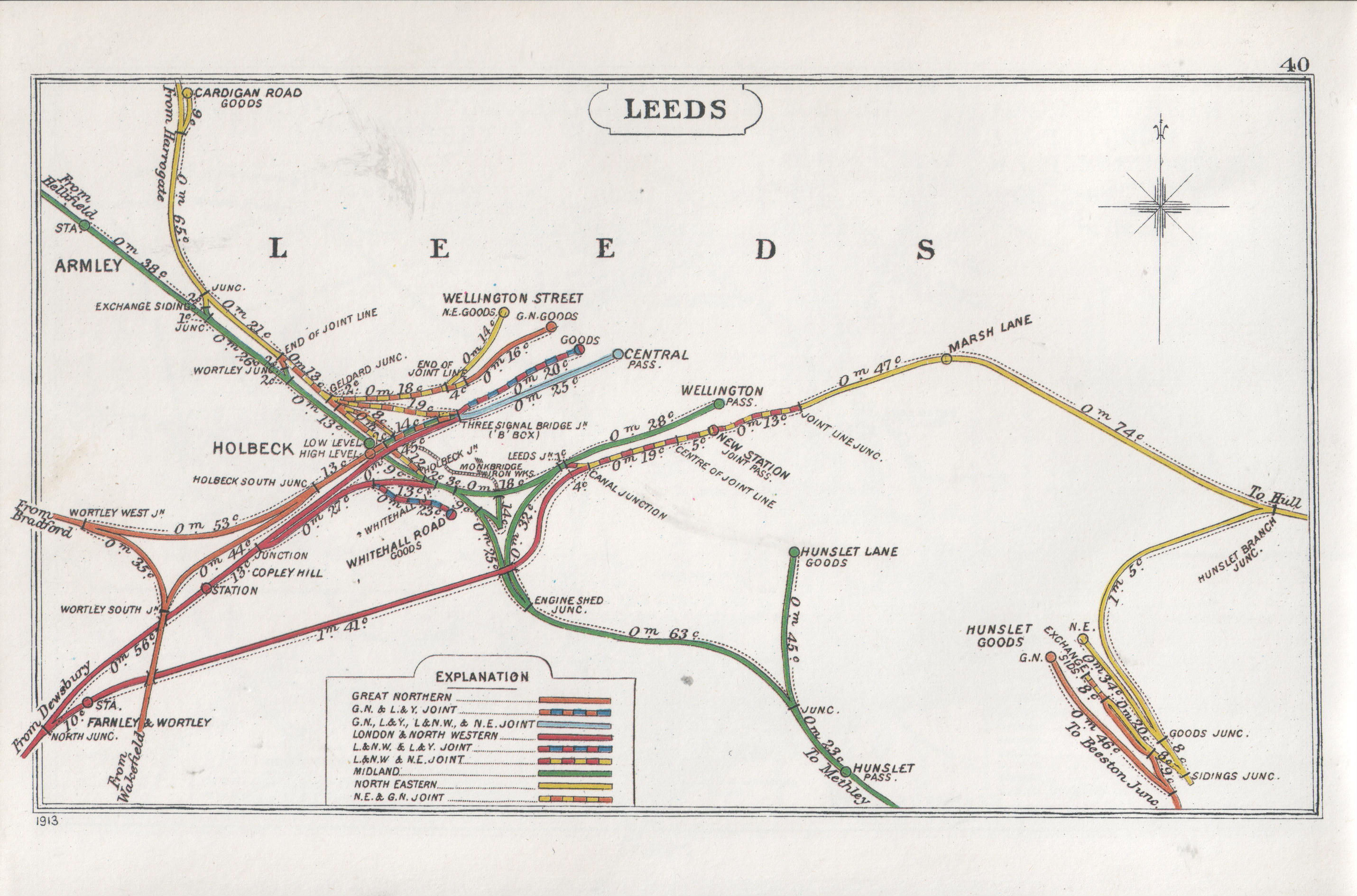
Railway lines in Leeds (1913)

Before the 1923 Grouping, the first section of the line (Leeds–Bradford) was owned by the Great Northern Railway (GNR); and the entire remainder by the Lancashire and Yorkshire Railway (L&YR), apart from the final section of the branch leading into Huddersfield, which was owned by the London and North Western Railway (LNWR).

For the section between Halifax and Burnley, the line uses the valley of the river Calder; this comprises two separate valleys with rivers of the same name: that of West Yorkshire and of Lancashire. It also follows the Rochdale Canal from Todmorden into Manchester. Since the route crosses the Pennines, there are many tunnels to negotiate.

The British Railways Board's Corporate Plan for 1983–88 marked the routes between Milner Royd Junction (east of Sowerby Bridge) and Bowling Junction (south of Bradford Interchange), and Milner Royd Junction and Heaton Lodge Junction (west of Mirfield) to be singled on a list, entitled The Proposed Elimination of Non-Essential Multiple Tracks. A combination of factors meant this was never implemented; the better gradients for freight than the Huddersfield trans-Pennine route and the mid-1980s uncertainty over the Settle-Carlisle line meant that this became the preferred route for goods between Leeds and Preston/Carlisle.

== Route ==
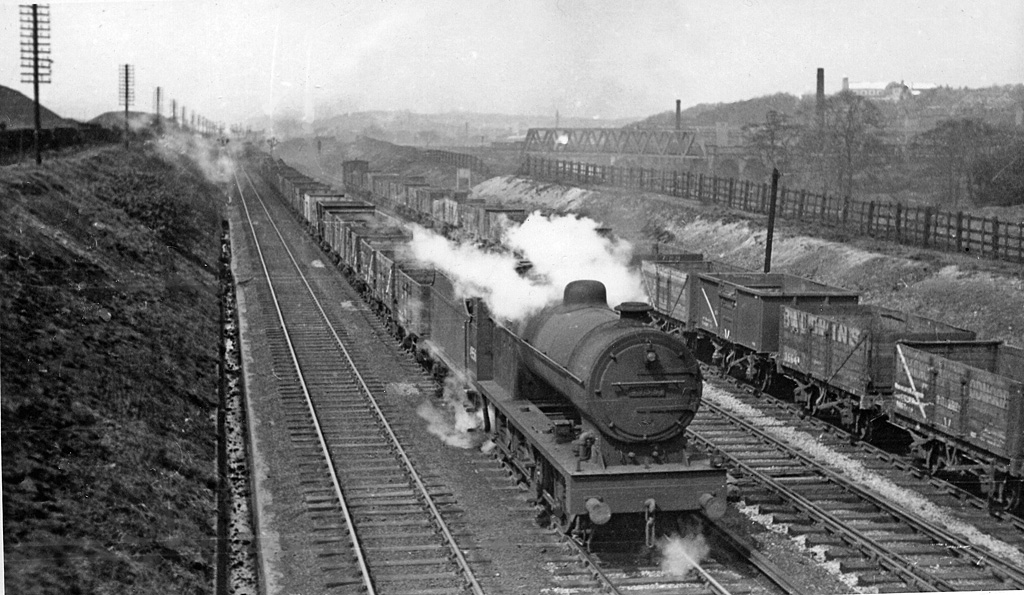
Two eastbound trains west of Mirfield (1950)

The following lists the original places served by the route. Many stations on this route have been closed; those currently open are marked in bold:

=== Leeds–Bradford ===
For the initial section of the route between Leeds and Bradford, see Leeds–Bradford lines.

=== Bradford–Halifax ===
- Bradford Interchange: replaced Bradford Exchange on a site nearby in 1973
- Bowling: previously named Bowling Junction for its link with the GNR at this point
- Bowling Tunnel 1,648 yards (1,507 m)
- Low Moor: a junction with the GNR; closed in 1965 and was reopened in April 2017
- A triangular junction for the L&YR line to Dewsbury
- Two tunnels: New Furnace and Wyke
- Wyke and Norwood Green
- Pickle Bridge junction for the Pickle Bridge Line to Huddersfield, now closed; there were two stations: Bailiff Bridge and Clifton Road
- Lightcliffe
- Lightcliffe Tunnel
- Hipperholme
- Beacon Hill Tunnel, 1,105 yards (1,010 m) in length
- **Halifax**.

On 24 October 1901, as the 18:10 down goods train from Low Moor to Leeds was passing through Bowling Tunnel, the rear section broke loose. It came to a stop in the tunnel and was run into from behind by the 21:05 goods train from Low Moor to Laisterdyke. Wreckage that was partly blocking the up line was then hit by the 21:00 passenger train from Leeds to Manchester. Nobody was killed, but there was extensive damage to the rolling stock.

=== Halifax–Huddersfield ===
This route was reopened to passengers in 2000, when Brighouse station was reopened; two short lengths of line were relaid, after being out of use for 15 years, to enable trains to reach Huddersfield.

- At Dryclough Junction, the Huddersfield route leaves the main line
- Greetland: closed in 1962
- Elland: closed in 1962, but is expected to reopen
- **Brighouse**
- Bradley: closed in 1950
- Deighton: only used by trains on the Huddersfield line
- **Huddersfield**.

=== Halifax–Manchester Oxford Road ===
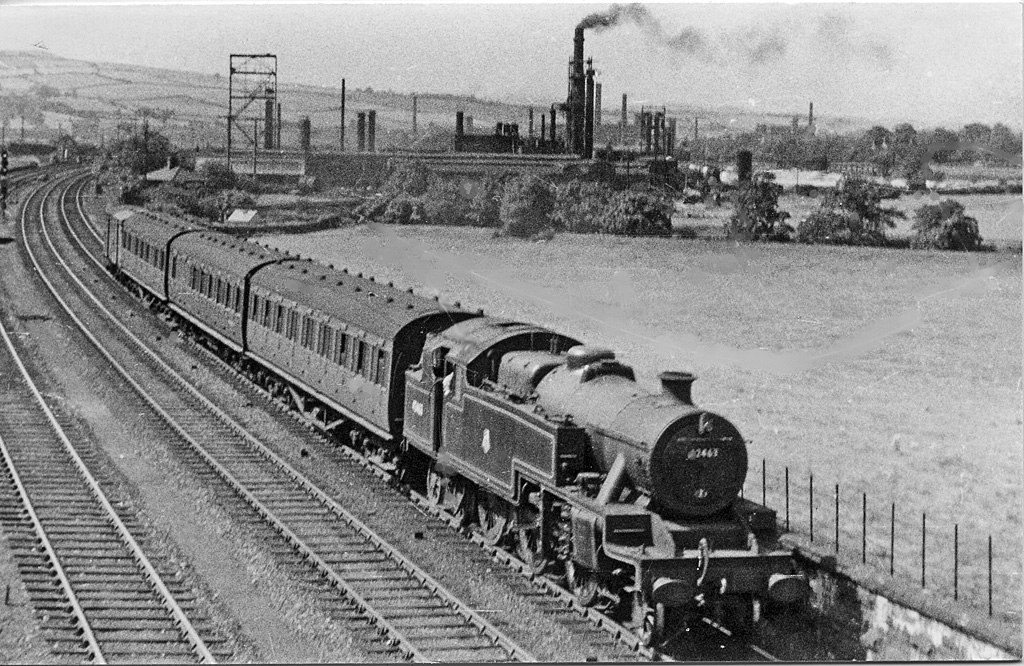
Eastbound local train between Mirfield and Thornhill (1953)

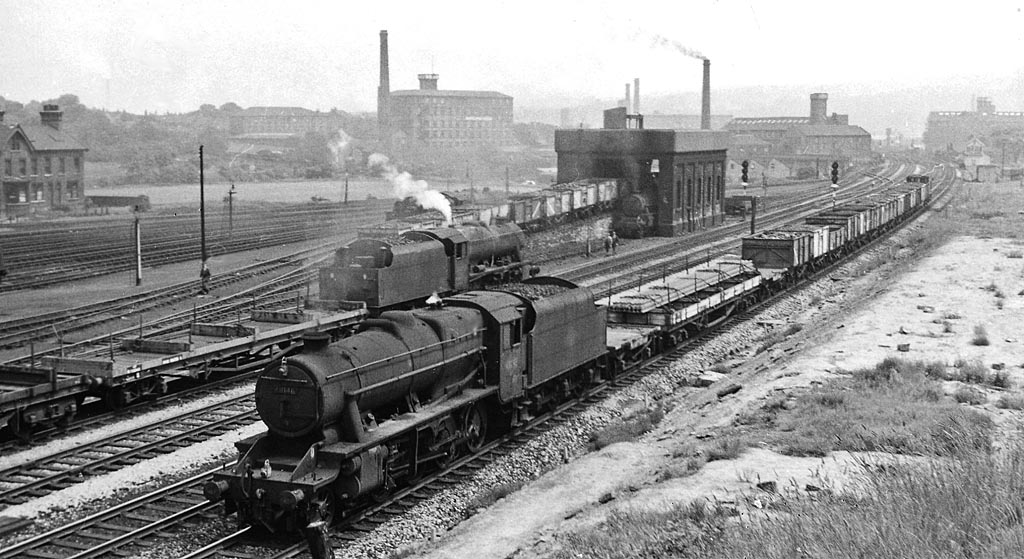
Calder Valley main line near Mirfield (1964)

Many stations on this route have been closed or are not served by the Calder Valley line trains; original stations served were:

- The triangular junction for the line to Dewsbury, via Mirfield; Brighouse is on this line
- Bank House Tunnel
- Copley
- The line now turns west into the Calder Valley, joining the original 1840 main line at Milner Royd Junction
- **Sowerby Bridge**
- Heading west, the line used to branch off to Ripponden; it was originally intended to continue to Littleborough but ended at Rishworth. It was closed to passengers on 8 July 1929
- Luddendenfoot
- Mytholmroyd
- Mytholmroyd Railway Viaduct
- Hebden Bridge: all Calder Valley Line services serve this station
- Weasel Hall Tunnel
- Eastwood
- Castle Hill, Horsfall and Millwood tunnels
- Hall Royd Junction, where trains on the Blackpool service turn north-westward, following the Calder Valley
- **Todmorden**, where the line takes a southward direction, in the same valley as the Rochdale Canal
- **Walsden**
- After Winterbutlee Tunnel, the line follows Summit Tunnel; at 2,885 yards (2,638 m), this was the longest on the L&YR lines. The line then crosses into the Metropolitan Borough of Rochdale, in Greater Manchester
- **Littleborough**
- **Smithy Bridge**
- **Rochdale**, where there was a junction for two lines: to Bacup (closed to passengers 16 June 1947) and to Oldham Mumps, which is now used by Manchester Metrolink light rail services
- **Castleton**, where there is a junction for a line to Bury Bolton Street
- **Mills Hill**
- Middleton Junction, where two lines separated away to: Middleton and Oldham (both now closed)
- **Moston**
- Newton Heath
- Miles Platting
- **Manchester Victoria**
- The route passes through **Salford Central**, on the former Liverpool and Manchester Railway, before traversing the Ordsall Chord to join the former Cheshire Lines Committee line
- **Deansgate**
- **Manchester Oxford Road**.

On 28 February 1902, a Wakefield to Rose Grove goods train broke into two due to a broken coupling, resulting in the rear half eventually crashing at high speed into the front half in Millwood Tunnel. No-one was killed, but wreckage filled the tunnel right up to the roof.

Summit Tunnel was the scene of a major fire in 1984, caused by a goods train formed of petrol tankers was derailing.

=== Manchester-Blackburn ===
The route continues up the Calder Valley to Burnley and Blackburn; it also runs parallel with the Leeds and Liverpool Canal from Burnley. The section from Todmorden to Burnley, often called the Copy Pit line, was opened by the Manchester and Leeds Railway (later part of the L&YR) on 12 November 1849. The East Lancashire Railway (also later part of the L&YR) built the Burnley-Preston line: Burnley-Accrington, 18 September 1848, Accrington-Blackburn 19 June 1848 and the Blackburn-Preston section on 1 June 1846.

The Rose Grove–Todmorden (Hall Royd) local service over this route ended in 1965; the only passenger services thereafter being a daily Leeds–Blackpool train. In mid-1982, the last tanker train travelled over the line, with the expectation of closure shortly after. A turning point came when the National and Provincial Building Society moved staff from Burnley to Bradford; it had arranged for a Preston–Bradford Interchange train to be run to move people from their home base to Bradford offices. In October 1984, British Rail developed this into five trains each way between Leeds and Preston, with one extended to Blackpool.

==== Todmorden curve ====
The Todmorden curve is a 440-yard (400 m) section of track at Hall Royd Junction in Todmorden which was lifted in 1972. Originally Hall Royd Junction was triangular, and the lifted curve allowed services from Burnley to reach Manchester via Todmorden; regular services over it had ceased in November 1965. Reinstating the curve was a priority for Lancashire County Council and was ranked as the most important project in its 2010 Rail Improvement Schemes draft report. In March 2010, the government stated that reinstating the link would cost around £7million and any new railway services would require initial subsidy.

The MP for Burnley, Kitty Ussher, wrote to the North West Development Agency to seek assurance that it could find the money. In October 2010, Network Rail agreed to pay for the final assessment of the plans. This assessment, completed in May 2011, concluded that it could be feasible to reinstate the curve, although the original route could not be used as the original curve was deemed to be too sharp. An alternative route was instead put forward and it was stated that, if funds could be obtained by early 2012 to carry forward the project, then the curve could be back in use by the end of 2013. On 31 October 2011, the deputy prime minister, Nick Clegg, announced that the scheme would be given the go-ahead.

Construction work began in summer 2013 and the curve was planned to be available for the May 2014 timetable change. The track was completed and tested in May 2014; services began on 17 May 2015.

==== Original stations ====
- Hall Royd Junction: there are now no stations on the route before Burnley
- The junction with the original line from Todmorden to Burnley, forming a triangle; closed 1972, but reopened in 2015
- Stansfield Hall: opened in 1869, closed in July 1944
- Kitsonwood Tunnel: 290 yards (270 m)
- Nott Wood (Lydgate Viaduct)
- Cornholme closed to all traffic on 26 September 1938
- Portsmouth: closed on 7 July 1958
- Copy Pit summit: 749 feet (228 m)
- Holme Tunnel: 265 yards (242 m)
- Holme: closed on 28 July 1930
- Towneley Tunnel: 398 yards (364 m)
- Towneley: serving the nearby Towneley Hall, closed on 4 August 1952
- **Burnley Manchester Road**
- Gannow Junction: where the line joins from Colne, Nelson, Brierfield, Burnley Central and Burnley Barracks
- **Rose Grove** has an island platform, with two disused bays
- Rose Grove Junction: for the North Lancashire Loop, an alternative route to Blackburn, via Padiham, Simonstone and Great Harwood; closed to passengers on 2 December 1957
- **Hapton**
- **Huncoat**
- **Accrington**
- The triangular junction for the line to Bury, which was closed on 5 December 1966
- **Church and Oswaldtwistle**
- **Rishton**
- Rishton Tunnel
- The other end of the line from Burnley, at Great Harwood Junction
- Blackburn Tunnel.

=== Blackburn to Preston ===
This part of the route is described in more detail in East Lancashire line.

- Blackburn: junction of the line to Bolton
- **Mill Hill**
- **Cherry Tree**
- The L&YR/LNWR joint line (the Lancashire Union Joint Railway) to Chorley and the West Coast Main Line; opened on 1 November 1869 and closed to passengers on 4 January 1960
- **Pleasington**
- **Hoghton**
- **Bamber Bridge**
- A junction for a direct route to Preston, the surviving route continues via Lostock Hall; here, there are further junctions, including one for the former through route to Liverpool Exchange.

=== Preston to Blackpool ===
This route is described in more detail in Blackpool branch lines.

- Preston: the joint LNWR/L&YR station on the West Coast Main Line
- **Lea Road**
- **Salwick**
- **Kirkham and Wesham**
- Junctions for the direct route to Blackpool and the coast route, via Lytham
- **Singleton**
- **Poulton-le-Fylde**
- The junction for Fleetwood; the line was closed to passengers on 1 June 1970
- Layton: opened as Bispham
- Blackpool North: originally named Talbot Road.

== Services ==
Passenger train services are operated by Northern Trains, which run on the following routes:

- Bradford Interchange–Halifax–Huddersfield
- Leeds–Dewsbury–Manchester Victoria–Wigan Wallgate
- Leeds–Halifax–Manchester Victoria–Chester
- York–Leeds–Halifax–Preston–Blackpool North
- Blackburn–Burnley–Todmorden–Manchester Victoria
- Halifax–Bradford Interchange–Leeds–Hull Paragon.

Along with the Huddersfield and York & Selby lines, this line was combined in national timetables to show a coast-to-coast service; however, since May 2018, this has been split again into separate routes for operational reasons and to improve service reliability. Through running to Chester began in May 2019, with a limited peak provision to Ellesmere Port, via Helsby.

Services within West Yorkshire are sponsored by West Yorkshire Metro, whose tickets (Note: Including Metrocards.) can be used up to Hebden Bridge between Leeds and Blackpool, and Walsden between Leeds and Manchester.

== Future ==
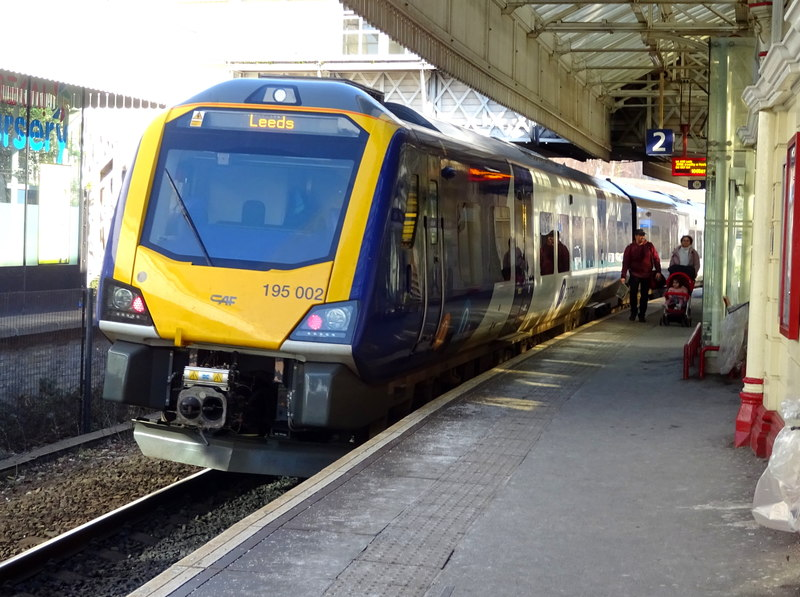
A Class 195 unit calls at Halifax (2020)

Improvements to the line were proposed as part of Network Rail's 2010 Northern Hub plans, which would allow for more frequent services on the line. Some services via Bradford would also be extended to Chester, Crewe, Liverpool and Manchester Airport. The Chester services started in December 2017 under the proposed Northern Connect brand, which has since been scrapped. Those services are operated by Class 195 diesel multiple units.

In 2018, the Manchester Airport trains briefly ran over the Ordsall Curve. However, those services have also been scrapped. Track and signalling upgrades between Hebden Bridge and Leeds, following on from work already carried out between Littleborough and Manchester, which will allow for quicker journey times by the autumn of 2018. The work will see four existing signal boxes between Hebden Bridge and Mill Lane Junction in Bradford closed, with signalling control transferred to the York Rail Operating Centre; this will also take over the operation of the parts of the line through Brighouse and Mirfield, which controlled currently from Huddersfield and Healey Mills panel boxes.

Low Moor station, between Bradford Interchange and Halifax, was reopened on 2 April 2017 after the original opening planned for 2005 was delayed by the discovery of disused mine workings under the station site. A business case is being developed to reopen Elland station between Halifax and Brighouse.

Calderdale Council has called for the route to be electrified as an alternative route to the line through Huddersfield should that be closed for engineering works. Tim Swift, the council's leader in 2015, stated that: "It makes no logical sense in terms of a long term network to electrify the Trans-Pennine North Route and not the Calder Valley Line." In March 2015, the Northern Sparks report was produced by a cross-party committee of MPs focusing on economic benefits of electrification in the North; the Calder Valley line in its entirety was its number one priority, which was reiterated in 2018.

The Integrated Rail Plan for the North and Midlands (IRP) was published on 18 November 2021, stating that the line from Leeds to Bradford Interchange would be electrified.

As part of Transport for Greater Manchester's Delivery Plan, there are plans to electrify the line between Manchester Victoria to Rochdale via Mills Hill; this forms part of the 2040 strategy, subject to funding.
