= Network Rail Route 23 (North West Rural) =

Network Rail's (NR) strategic route 23 encompassed mainly the English rural railway lines of Lancashire and Cumbria. It excluded the part of the West Coast Main Line (WCML) that bisects the counties. It included the following lines:

- the Settle and Carlisle line from Skipton to Carlisle
- the Cumbrian Coast Line from Carnforth to Carlisle via Sellafield and Workington
- the Roses line from Preston to Burnley Manchester Road/Hall Royd Junction, and the branch to Burnley Central and Colne
- the Blackburn to Hellifield line via Clitheroe, part of the Ribble Valley Line
- the Hellifield (Settle Junction) to Carnforth line via Wennington
- the Hellifield to Skipton line
- the Ormskirk to Farrington Curve Junction (near Preston) line
- the Oxenholme to Windermere branch of the WCML
- various freight-only branches and chords, including in the Carlisle area

Some of these routes and/or services are designated as Community Rail Partnerships (CRP):

- East Lancashire CRP (Preston to Colne service)
- West of Lancashire CRP (Southport to Wigan, Ormskirk to Preston)
- Lakes Line CRP (Oxenholme to Windermere)
- Clitheroe Line CRP (Manchester to Clitheroe service).

In 2010, Network Rail restructured its route categorisation. Routes 10, 20 and 23, and parts of Routes 9 and 11, were merged into Strategic Route H: Cross-Pennine, Yorkshire & Humber and North West.
