= Pleasington railway station =

Railway station in Lancashire, England

Coordinates: 53.731°N 2.544°W

Pleasington
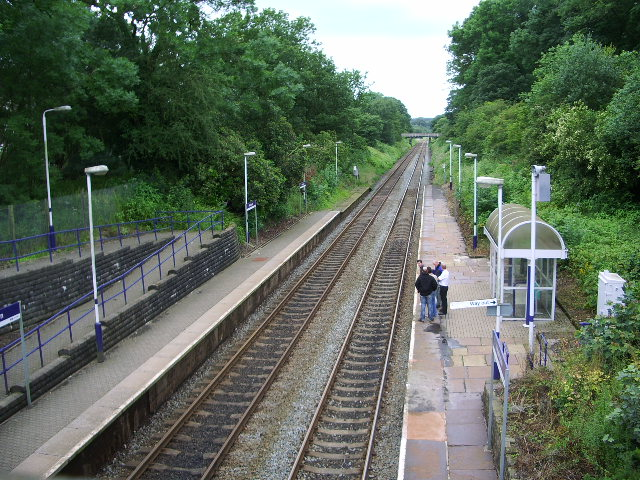

General information
- Location: Pleasington, Blackburn with Darwen; England
- Grid reference: SD642262
- Manager: Northern
- Platforms: 2

Other information
- Station code: PLS
- Classification: DfT category F2

History
- Opened: 1846

Passengers
- 2021/22: ▲9,632
- 2022/23: ▼8,064
- 2023/24: ▼7,720
- 2024/25: ▲9,764
- 2025/26: ▲12,308
Location
Notes
- Passenger statistics from the Office of Rail and Road

Pleasington railway station serves the village of Pleasington in Lancashire, England. The station is on the East Lancashire Line 3 miles (5 km) west of Blackburn railway station. It is managed by Northern, who also provide all the passenger services calling there.

It is unstaffed, and has no permanent buildings, other than standard waiting shelters. A long line PA system and digital information screens are provided, Step free access for disabled travellers is provided by means of ramps to each platform.

As of January 2018, along with other stations on this line, a new touch screen Ticket Machine was added to the station.

A £2,000 refurbishment scheme at the station, funded by East Lancs Community Rail Partnership and the local authority, was carried out in 2015, by a consortium of college students, community workers and volunteers.

== Services ==
Monday to Saturdays, there is an hourly service from Pleasington towards Preston westbound and Blackburn, Burnley Central and Colne, eastbound. There is a two-hourly service on Sundays.

From 14 May 2012, Pleasington became a request only stop, in addition to Hapton, Burnley Barracks and Huncoat. Since December 2025 the station returned to being a regular scheduled stop

Preceding station	National Rail	Following station
Bamber Bridge	Northern; East Lancashire Line	Cherry Tree
	Historical railways	
Hoghton	East Lancashire Railway	Cherry Tree
