= Brierfield railway station =

Railway station in Lancashire, England

Brierfield
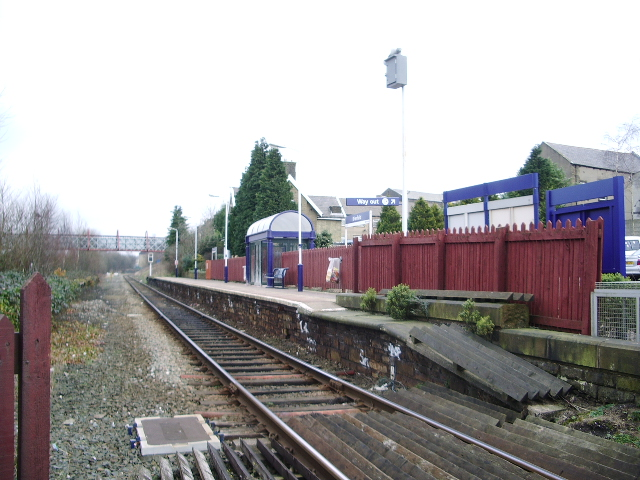
- Looking northward, towards Nelson in 2008

General information
- Location: Brierfield, Pendle; England
- Coordinates: 53.825°N 2.237°W
- Grid reference: SD845365
- Manager: Northern Trains
- Platforms: 1

Other information
- Station code: BRF
- Classification: DfT category F2

History
- Original company: East Lancashire Railway
- Pre-grouping: Lancashire and Yorkshire Railway
- Post-grouping: London, Midland and Scottish Railway

Key dates
- 1 February 1849: Opened as Marsden
- 1 August 1857: Renamed Brierfield

Passengers
- 2021/22: ▲27,308
- 2022/23: ▲29,410
- 2023/24: ▲29,958
- 2024/25: ▲36,894
- 2025/26: ▲41,548
Location
Notes
- Passenger statistics from the Office of Rail and Road

Brierfield railway station serves the town of Brierfield, Lancashire, England and is on the East Lancashire Line 2 1/4 miles (3.6 km) east of Burnley Central railway station towards Colne (the terminus). The station is managed by Northern Trains, who also provide all passenger trains serving it.

The station is unstaffed and only has basic facilities (no waiting room, just a shelter and a modern ticket vending machine), though there are passenger information screens, timetable posters and a long-line PA system in place to provide train running information. The platform has step-free access from the adjoining street.

== History ==
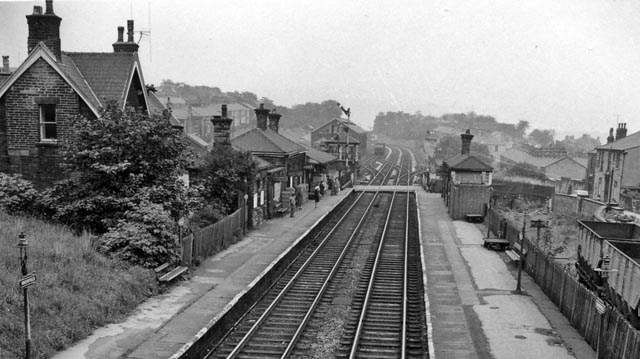
The station in 1962

The station, originally named Marsden, opened with the East Lancashire Railway's line between Burnley and Colne on 1 February 1849. It was 8 1/4 miles (13.3 km) from Accrington, and on 1 August 1857 it was renamed Brierfield. The line through the station has been single track since December 1986, but the double track-bed and the disused down platform are still in place, as is the old station building (though this is now privately owned).

The signal box (which was built in 1876 and latterly only operated the adjacent level crossing) was abolished and dismantled in September 2014, when the crossing was converted to automatic operation under the remote supervision of Preston PSB. The box structure has been donated to a local arts organisation (In-Situ) and is to be rebuilt nearby at Brierfield Mills.

There is an active Rail user Group based here - "The Friends of Brierfield Station"

== Services ==
Monday to Saturdays, there is an hourly service from Brierfield towards Burnley Central, Accrington, Blackburn and Preston westbound and Colne, eastbound. There is a two-hourly service in each direction on Sundays, with through trains to Blackpool South.

Preceding station	National Rail	Following station
Burnley Central	Northern Trains East Lancashire Line	Nelson
Historical railways
Reedley Hallows Halt Line open, station closed	Lancashire and Yorkshire Railway East Lancashire Railway	Nelson Line and station open
