= Church & Oswaldtwistle railway station =

Railway station in Lancashire, England

Church & Oswaldtwistle
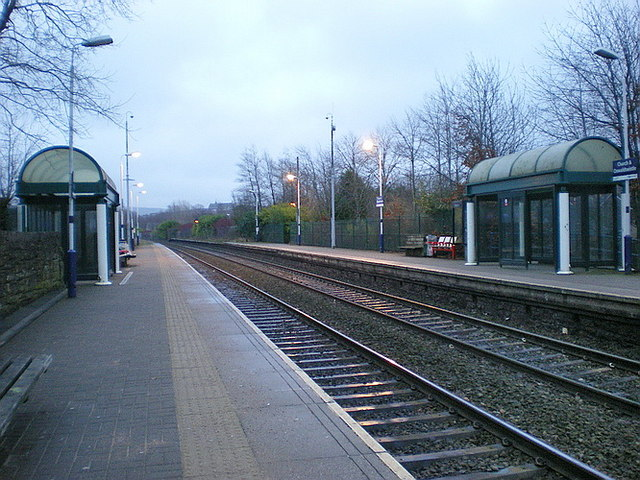

General information
- Location: Church, Hyndburn; England
- Coordinates: 53.750°N 2.391°W
- Grid reference: SD743283
- Managed by: Northern Trains
- Platforms: 2

Other information
- Station code: CTW
- Classification: DfT category F2

History
- Original company: East Lancashire Railway
- Pre-grouping: Lancashire and Yorkshire Railway
- Post-grouping: London Midland and Scottish Railway

Key dates
- 19 June 1848: Opened as Church station
- 1 July 1895: Renamed Church and Oswaldtwistle

Passengers
- 2020/21: ▼11,176
- 2021/22: ▲42,370
- 2022/23: ▲45,522
- 2023/24: ▲47,148
- 2024/25: ▲59,450
Location
Notes
- Passenger statistics from the Office of Rail and Road

Church & Oswaldtwistle railway station serves both the village of Church and the town of Oswaldtwistle, in Lancashire, England. The station is 5 1/3 miles (8.6 km) east of Blackburn railway station, on the East Lancashire Line operated by Northern Trains.

== History ==
Situated in the middle of Church's suburban streets, the station had fallen into disrepair, but was modernised in November 2005.

The platforms are linked via a subway, but only the Preston bound one has step free access. It is unstaffed, but like other stations on the line, it has been fitted with passenger information screens, and a public address system to provide train running information. There is a ticket vending machine available (installed in early 2018) to allow intending travellers to buy their tickets before boarding.

The local Church and Oswaldtwistle Rotary Club have adopted the station as one of their projects and regularly work to improve the station environment by carrying out cleaning and maintenance of garden areas etc.

In August 2010, a man laid on the tracks, and was hit by a train in the station. In March 2011, another man was hit by a train, although he survived. In August 2011, a train driver apprehended a man walking on tracks near the station.

== Services ==
Monday to Saturday, there is an hourly service from Church & Oswaldtwistle towards Blackburn and Preston westbound and Accrington, Burnley Central & Colne.

On Sundays, this service is two-hourly in both directions. This is supplemented with the Sunday hourly service to Blackburn westbound, and to Burnley Manchester Road and Manchester Victoria eastbound, which passes through (but does not stop) on Mondays to Saturdays.

| Preceding station | National Rail | Following station |
|---|---|---|
| Rishton | Northern Trains East Lancashire Line | Accrington |
| | Historical railways | |
| Rishton Line and station open | Lancashire and Yorkshire Railway East Lancashire Railway | Accrington Line and station open |
