= Bott Lane Halt railway station =

Disused railway station in Lancashire, England

Bott Lane Halt

General information
- Location: Colne, Lancashire; England
- Coordinates: 53.8454°N 2.1935°W
- Platforms: 2

Other information
- Status: Disused

History
- Opened: October 1906; 119 years ago
- Closed: 3 December 1956; 69 years ago
- Original company: Lancashire and Yorkshire Railway
- Pre-grouping: Lancashire and Yorkshire Railway
- Post-grouping: London, Midland and Scottish Railway
Location
- Location within Lancashire

Bott Lane Halt railway station was a station on the East Lancashire line between Nelson and Colne, in Lancashire, England. It was situated off Bott House Lane near Colne and was closed in 1956 to passengers. The line remains open between Colne and Burnley, however nothing remains of the halt.

Preceding station	Historical railways	Following station
Nelson; Line and station open	Lancashire and Yorkshire Railway; East Lancashire Railway	Colne; Line and station open
