= New Hall Bridge Halt railway station =

Disused railway station in Lancashire, England

New Hall Bridge Halt

General information
- Location: Burnley, Lancashire; England
- Coordinates: 53.8030°N 2.2452°W
- Platforms: 2

Other information
- Status: Disused

History
- Original company: Lancashire and Yorkshire Railway
- Pre-grouping: Lancashire and Yorkshire Railway
- Post-grouping: London, Midland and Scottish Railway

Key dates
- October 1906: Opened
- 27 Sept.1948: Closed
Location
- Location within Lancashire

New Hall Bridge Halt railway station was a station on the East Lancashire line between Brierfield and Burnley in Lancashire, England. It was situated near New Hall Street in Burnley and was closed in 1948 to passengers. The line remains open between Colne and Burnley, however nothing remains of the halt.

Preceding station	Historical railways	Following station
Burnley Bank Top; Line and station open	Lancashire and Yorkshire Railway; East Lancashire Railway	Reedley Hallows Halt; Line open, station closed
