= Burnley Barracks railway station =

Railway station in Lancashire, England

Burnley Barracks
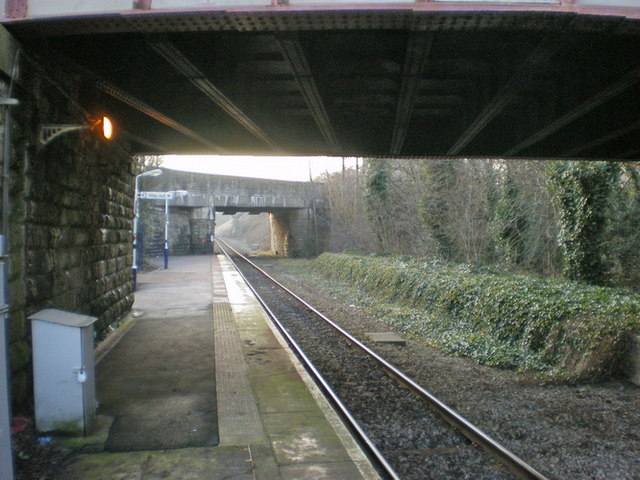

General information
- Location: Burnley, Burnley; England
- Coordinates: 53.791°N 2.258°W
- Grid reference: SD831327
- Manager: Northern Trains
- Platforms: 1

Other information
- Station code: BUB
- Classification: DfT category F2

Key dates
- 18 September 1848: Opened as Burnley Westgate, a temporary terminus for line from Accrington
- 1 February 1849: Closed following opening of extension to Colne
- 1851: Reopened as Burnley Barracks

Passengers
- 2021/22: ▲26,928
- 2022/23: ▼25,904
- 2023/24: ▲29,030
- 2024/25: ▲29,796
- 2025/26: ▼25,586
Location
Notes
- Passenger statistics from the Office of Rail and Road

Burnley Barracks railway station is in the town of Burnley, England, on the East Lancashire Line between Burnley Central and Rose Grove, 21 miles 38 chains (34.6 km) from Farington Curve Junction, near Leyland. The station is managed by Northern Trains, who operate all services.

== History ==
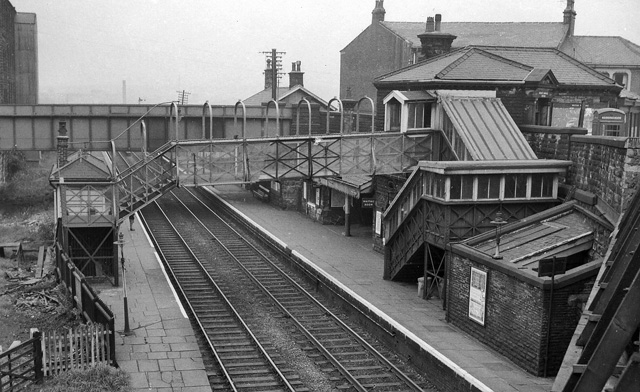
The station in 1962

The station opened on 18 September 1848 either mononymously as Burnley, or as Burnley Westgate, as a temporary terminus for the East Lancashire Railway whilst an extension was built between Accrington and Colne. It closed four months later when the Colne extension opened. However, the surrounding area developed quickly with industry, housing and the local barracks, which led to the station being reopened under its current name in 1851. The barracks themselves (latterly home to the East Lancashire Regiment) have been closed since December 1898 and the site subsequently sold off.

A local campaign in 2008 attempted to rename the station "Burnley Barack Obama", after the former President of the United States.

It was one of the stations featured in the Channel 4 documentary series Paul Merton's Secret Stations in the spring of 2016.

== Facilities ==
There is a basic shelter and a ticket machine, as well as passenger information screens and timetable boards available, along with a PA system to provide train running information.

== Passenger volume ==
Passenger volume at Burnley Barracks
	2004–05	2005–06	2006–07	2007–08	2008–09	2009–10	2010–11	2011–12	2012–13	2013–14	2014–15	2015–16	2016–17	2017–18	2018–19	2019–20	2020–21	2021–22	2022–23	2023–24	2024–25
Entries and exits	1,103	964	1,776	2,110	3,854	9,986	13,980	17,186	18,580	24,772	25,834	24,572	20,080	22,130	18,028	26,008	9,316	26,928	25,904	29,030	29,796

The statistics cover twelve month periods that start in April.

== Services ==
On weekdays, there is an hourly service to Colne (eastbound) and Preston (westbound). On Sundays, there is a two-hourly service in each direction. On Sundays, trains continue beyond Preston to Blackpool South.

From 14 May 2012, Barracks became a request stop, in addition to Hapton, Huncoat and Pleasington. Since December 2025, the station has returned to being a regular scheduled stop.

Preceding station	National Rail	Following station
Rose Grove	Northern Trains East Lancashire Line	Burnley Central
	Historical railways	
Rose Grove Line and station open	Lancashire and Yorkshire Railway East Lancashire Railway	Burnley Central Line and station open

== Future proposals ==
If the Skipton-Colne rail link reopens, and the existing East Lancashire Line is modernised, then Burnley Barracks would close to passengers.

== Bibliography ==
- Quick, Michael (2023). Railway Passenger Stations in Great Britain: A Chronology (PDF) (5th ed.). London: Railway and Canal Historical Society.
- Wills, Dixe (2014). Tiny Stations (Paperback, 1st reprint ed.). Basingstoke: AA Publishing. ISBN 978-0-7495-7732-2.
