= Burnley Manchester Road railway station =

Railway station in Lancashire, England

Coordinates: 53.785°N 2.249°W

Burnley Manchester Road
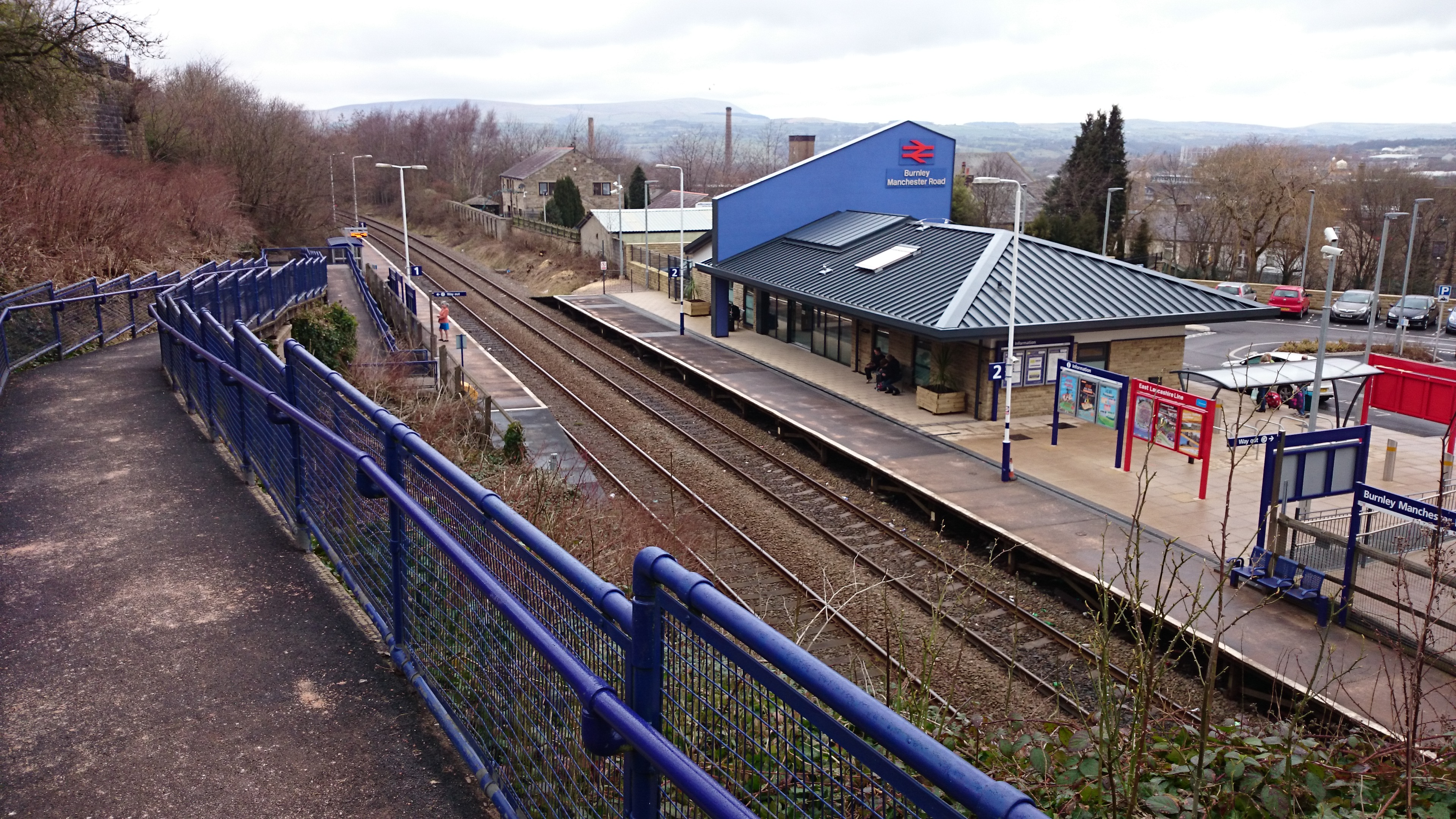

General information
- Location: Burnley, Burnley; England
- Grid reference: SD836322
- Managed by: Northern
- Platforms: 2

Other information
- Station code: BYM
- Classification: DfT category F1

History
- Original company: Lancashire and Yorkshire Railway
- Pre-grouping: Lancashire and Yorkshire Railway
- Post-grouping: London, Midland and Scottish Railway

Key dates
- 1 November 1866: Station opens
- 6 November 1961: Closed
- 13 October 1986: Station rebuilt and reopened

Passengers
- 2020/21: ▼99,694
- Interchange: ▼1,950
- 2021/22: ▲0.422 million
- Interchange: ▲7,060
- 2022/23: ▲0.507 million
- Interchange: ▲7,748
- 2023/24: ▲0.521 million
- Interchange: ▲13,195
- 2024/25: ▲0.583 million
- Interchange: ▲14,982
Location
Notes
- Passenger statistics from the Office of Rail and Road

Burnley Manchester Road is the main railway station in the town of Burnley, Lancashire, England. It is situated on the Calder Valley Line 24 1/2 miles (39.4 km) east of Preston, near to the route's junction with the East Lancashire Line.

== History ==
The town of Burnley had been served by the East Lancashire Railway (ELR) since 16 September 1848 when their line was extended from Accrington to Burnley Westgate; this line was further extended, to Colne, on 1 February 1849.

=== Thorneybank station ===
In June 1845 the Manchester and Leeds Railway (M&LR), at that time a rival of the ELR, was authorised to build a single-track branch, the Copy Pit Line, from its main line at Todmorden to Burnley; whilst it was under construction the M&LR amalgamated with other railways in 1847 to create the Lancashire and Yorkshire Railway (LYR), and on 12 November 1849, the branch was opened by the LYR. The Burnley terminus of this was on the south-eastern side of Manchester Road and was named Burnley Thorneybank; it had a single platform for passenger trains, which could accommodate six coaches; other facilities at the station were a goods shed and an engine shed. There was no signal box, the levers to operate the various points in the station area instead being situated next to each of the points concerned. To begin with there was no connection to the ELR line, but in August 1850, a double-track link to the ELR at Gannow Junction (between Rose Grove and Burnley Westgate) was opened, and this link was known as the East Lancashire sidings. Manchester Road crossed on a bridge over the East Lancashire sidings. A fatal accident occurred at Thorneybank station on 12 July 1852.

The ELR and the LYR amalgamated on 13 August 1859, and under the terms of the amalgamation act, the Copy Pit line was doubled, the second track opening on 1 July 1860. Thorneybank station closed on 1 November 1866, being replaced by a new station on the other side of Manchester Road.

==== 1852 accident ====
Two school excursion trains from Burnley were run on 12 July 1852, one bound for York and the other for Goole, and both were double-headed. The York train had 1,000 passengers in 45 four-wheel coaches and the Goole train had 800 passengers in 35 coaches. The trains had three and two guards respectively, and each guard had control of two handbrakes – one on each of two adjacent carriages. Because of the length of the trains, they could not be loaded at Thorneybank station platform but instead started from the East Lancashire sidings, and the outward trips were without incident.

The last normal train of the day arrived at Burnley at 7:00 pm, after which the only railway employees left on duty were Parker, the porter, and Grant, a night-watchman. To assist them later on with the return of the two excursions, two casual men (James Crabtree, a calico printer; and Thomas Bridge, a blacksmith) had been engaged for the evening; this was a common arrangement when trains were expected at times when few railway staff were available.

When the trains returned, the intention was for each train to stop just short of Burnley Thorneybank station for the engines to be detached, and then let the carriages run under gravity down the 1:69 gradient to the East Lancashire sidings, to be stopped by the guards using their handbrakes. To allow the train through to the East Lancashire sidings instead of running into the station platform, a man had to pull a lever to set the points. These points were weighted to normally lie for the platform, and there was no catch to hold the lever in position, so the man who pulled the lever also had to hold it in place until the whole train had passed through. This task was given to Crabtree, and was achieved successfully for the first train to return, that from York which arrived at 10:30 pm. When the Goole train arrived an hour later, Crabtree decided to give Bridge the task of pulling and holding the point lever. After the engines had been detached, Bridge was called away by one of the engine drivers who wanted a different pair of points moved, so that the engines could reach the engine shed. Bridge let go of the first lever, and the weight immediately moved the points back to their normal position. As a result of this, the coaches ran into the platform line, and collided with the wooden buffer stop at the end of the track 140 yards (130 m) from the points, causing the fifth and sixth coaches to rise up on end. These two coaches, and also the seventh, had buffers mounted at a lower level than normal, and the end pressure from adjacent coaches forced the coach ends down, tilting the other end of the coach up. Four of the passengers were killed and many injured.

=== Manchester Road station ===
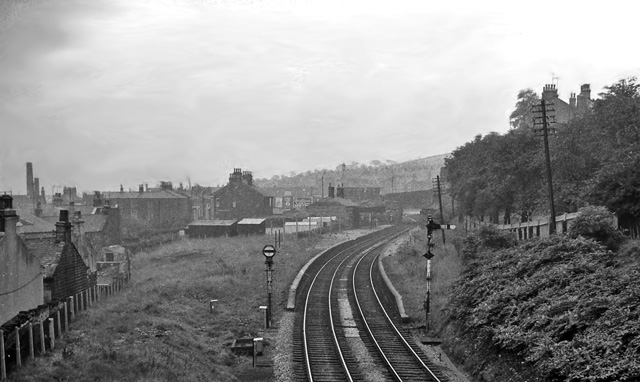
The station in 1962, looking south-east

To replace Burnley Thorneybank, a new station on the Gannow Junction extension named Burnley Manchester Road was built on the north-western side of Manchester Road, and it opened on 1 November 1866. It had two stone platforms, a modest single-storey main building on the eastbound ("up") side and a smaller waiting room with toilets on the opposite side.

This closed to passenger traffic on 6 November 1961, and to goods in April 1973. The platforms were subsequently demolished, but the main building was retained and used as industrial premises for a local dairy.

The station was reopened (with new timber platforms) in September 1986, two years after the successful re-introduction of year-round services between Leeds and Preston/Blackpool North. The old station building was eventually demolished in 2013.

The town currently has three other railway stations, Rose Grove is to the west of Gannow Junction (itself west of the town centre), whilst Burnley Barracks and Burnley Central are on the East Lancashire Line which diverges from the Caldervale Line at Gannow Junction.

== Services ==
As of May 2025, the weekday off-peak service pattern is as follows:

- 1 tph to Blackpool North via Accrington, Blackburn and Preston
- 1 tph to Blackburn via Rose Grove and Accrington
- 1 tph to York via Hebden Bridge, Bradford Interchange and Leeds
- 1 tph to Headbolt Lane via Rochdale, Manchester Victoria and Wigan Wallgate

On Sundays there is now an hourly service (from mid-morning onwards) between Blackpool North and York, following the May 2009 timetable change. Before this, service was less consistent.

From 17 May 2015 an hourly service between Blackburn and Manchester Victoria was introduced, serving the station seven days a week. This calls at Accrington and Rose Grove, then Todmorden and most local stations to Manchester (except Walsden and Moston, which are only served on Sundays). Most trains also continue to Wigan Wallgate and Headbolt Lane between Monday and Saturday. Before this, passengers wishing to reach Manchester would travel to Blackburn and change.

=== 2013 Engineering work ===
Eastbound services (i.e. toward Hebden Bridge) were suspended for 5 months from November 2013 until the end of March 2014 whilst Network Rail carried out major repairs to Holme Tunnel (near to the site of the old Holme station). The 265-yard (250 m) long structure had been subject to a permanent 20 mph speed restriction for many years due to earth movement in the surrounding ground that had damaged the tunnel lining and eastern portal (steel supports were installed for most of the way along the tunnel bore since the mid-1980s to prevent further deterioration). The 20-week-long blockade has seen the tunnel lining strengthened & re-profiled, the damaged lining sections replaced, the eastern portal rebuilt, new track laid and drainage improvements carried out. Since completion, trains can pass through the tunnel at 45 mph (72 kmh). Replacement buses operated to and from Hebden Bridge, connecting with the train services from Blackpool and Preston whilst the work was in progress. The line was reopened to traffic as scheduled on 24 March 2014.

== Developments ==
Local councils and MP had campaigned to restore a direct rail link between the town and Manchester Victoria using the defunct south to west curve at Todmorden which was removed following the withdrawal of local trains in November 1965. This would allow trains to run between Burnley and Manchester via Rochdale in less than an hour. Network Rail had intimated in its Lancashire & Cumbria RUS that such a link would be possible, but that the business case would only be viable with third party funding. It was thought that the scheme would proceed following the finalising of a Multi Area funding agreement between central government and a consortium of councils in East Lancashire in January 2009, although it was subsequently omitted from the list of projects recommended for funding over the next decade by the North West Regional Development Agency in July 2009.

On 31 October 2011, it was announced that the scheme had been granted finance as part of the Regional Growth Fund announced by Deputy Prime Minister Nick Clegg. Services were initially due to start at the May 2014 timetable change following completion of the curve (and its signalling) and the Holme Tunnel work. All structural work was completed by spring 2014. However, due to a lack of available rolling stock and unfinished signalling changes at the Todmorden end (which were not completed until February 2015) it was announced that services would not start until May 2015 at the earliest (eventually doing so at the May timetable change).

The plans have also seen the station facilities upgraded at a cost of £2.3 million with the opening of a new ticket office in a new station building and the provision of additional car parking spaces and new waiting shelters; completion was scheduled for Spring 2014. The station building opened in November 2014, having been almost complete and awaiting improvements to lighting since July.

The new ticket office is staffed throughout the week, from start of service until 21:45 on weekdays and Saturdays and until 17:00 on Sundays. A self-service ticket machine is also available on the concourse. Train running information is offered via digital display screens, automatic announcements and timetable posters. Step-free access to both platforms is available via ramps from Manchester Road.

== Notes ==
Preceding station	National Rail	Following station
Accrington	Northern; Calder Valley Line	Hebden Bridge
Rose Grove	Northern via Todmorden Curve	Todmorden
	Historical railways	
Rose Grove; Line and station open	L&YR; Copy Pit Line	Towneley; Line open, station closed
