= Rishton railway station =

Railway station in Lancashire, England

Coordinates: 53.764°N 2.420°W

Rishton
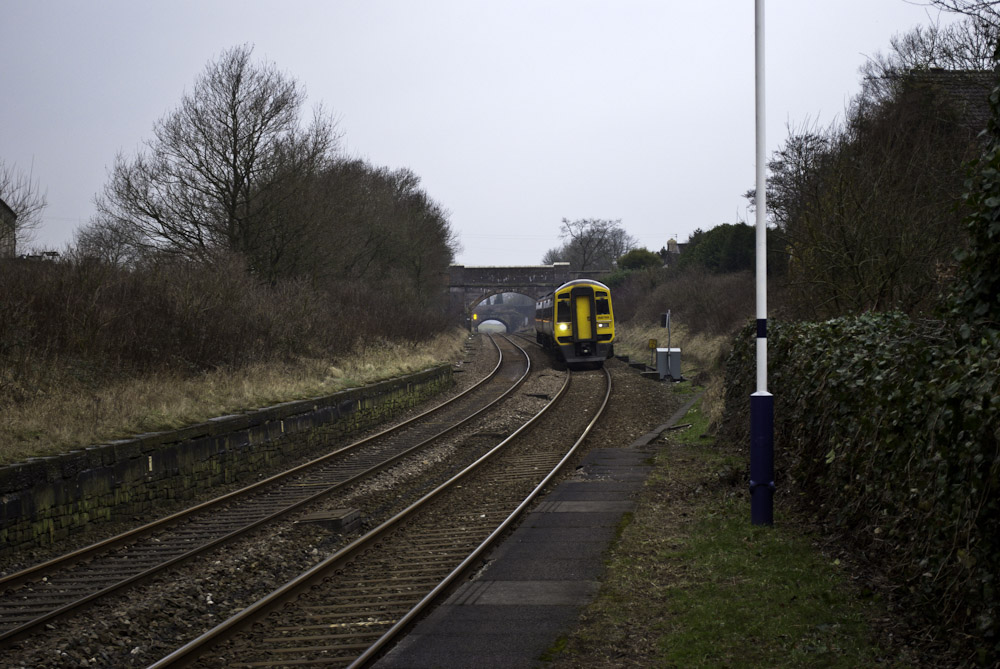
- A Northern Class 158 Express Sprinter unit passes through Rishton on a service from Blackpool North to York on 10 February 2012

General information
- Location: Rishton, Hyndburn; England
- Grid reference: SD723298
- Manager: Northern Trains
- Platforms: 2

Other information
- Station code: RIS
- Classification: DfT category F2

Key dates
- 1848: first station opened
- 1852: resited

Passengers
- 2021/22: ▲36,434
- 2022/23: ▲37,642
- 2023/24: ▲38,234
- 2024/25: ▲41,332
- 2025/26: ▲46,024
Location
Notes
- Passenger statistics from the Office of Rail and Road

Rishton railway station is in the southern part of the town of Rishton, Lancashire, England. The station is on the East Lancashire Line, operated by Northern Trains.

== History ==
A wooden platform was opened on 19 June 1848, when the line was first opened by the East Lancashire Railway, at a place where the Blackburn Road crosses the railway. This was replaced by a station at the current, more convenient location at the end of Station Road in 1852.

== Facilities ==
Only parts of each platform are now used by passenger trains. They are linked by a pedestrian footbridge and there are shelters on each one. Passenger information screens, and a long line PA system provide train running information. The station is unstaffed but it has a ticket machine that only accepts bank cards (not cash). Tickets must be purchased from the ticket machine or in advance.

As the Preston bound platform is reached by the footbridge only, step-free access is limited to the eastbound platform.

== Services ==
Monday to Saturdays, there is an hourly service from Rishton towards Blackburn and Preston, westbound and Burnley Central and Colne, eastbound. There is a two-hourly service in each direction on Sundays.

Preceding station	National Rail	Following station
Blackburn	Northern Trains East Lancashire Line	Church & Oswaldtwistle
	Historical railways	
Blackburn Line and station open	Lancashire and Yorkshire Railway East Lancashire Railway	Church & Oswaldtwistle Line and station open
