= Reedley Hallows Halt railway station =

Disused railway station in Lancashire, England

Reedley Hallows Halt

General information
- Location: Burnley, Lancashire; England
- Coordinates: 53.8094°N 2.2426°W
- Platforms: 2

Other information
- Status: Disused

History
- Original company: Lancashire and Yorkshire Railway
- Pre-grouping: Lancashire and Yorkshire Railway
- Post-grouping: London, Midland and Scottish Railway

Key dates
- October 1906: Opened
- 3 December 1956: Closed
Location
- Location within Lancashire

Reedley Hallows Halt railway station was a station on the East Lancashire line between Brierfield and Burnley in Lancashire, England. It was situated on a bridge crossing Barden Lane near Burnley and was closed in 1956 to passengers. The line remains open between Colne and Burnley, however nothing remains of the halt.

Preceding station	Historical railways	Following station
New Hall Bridge Halt; Line open, station closed	Lancashire and Yorkshire Railway; East Lancashire Railway	Brierfield; Line and station open
