= Hapton railway station =

Railway station in Lancashire, England

Hapton
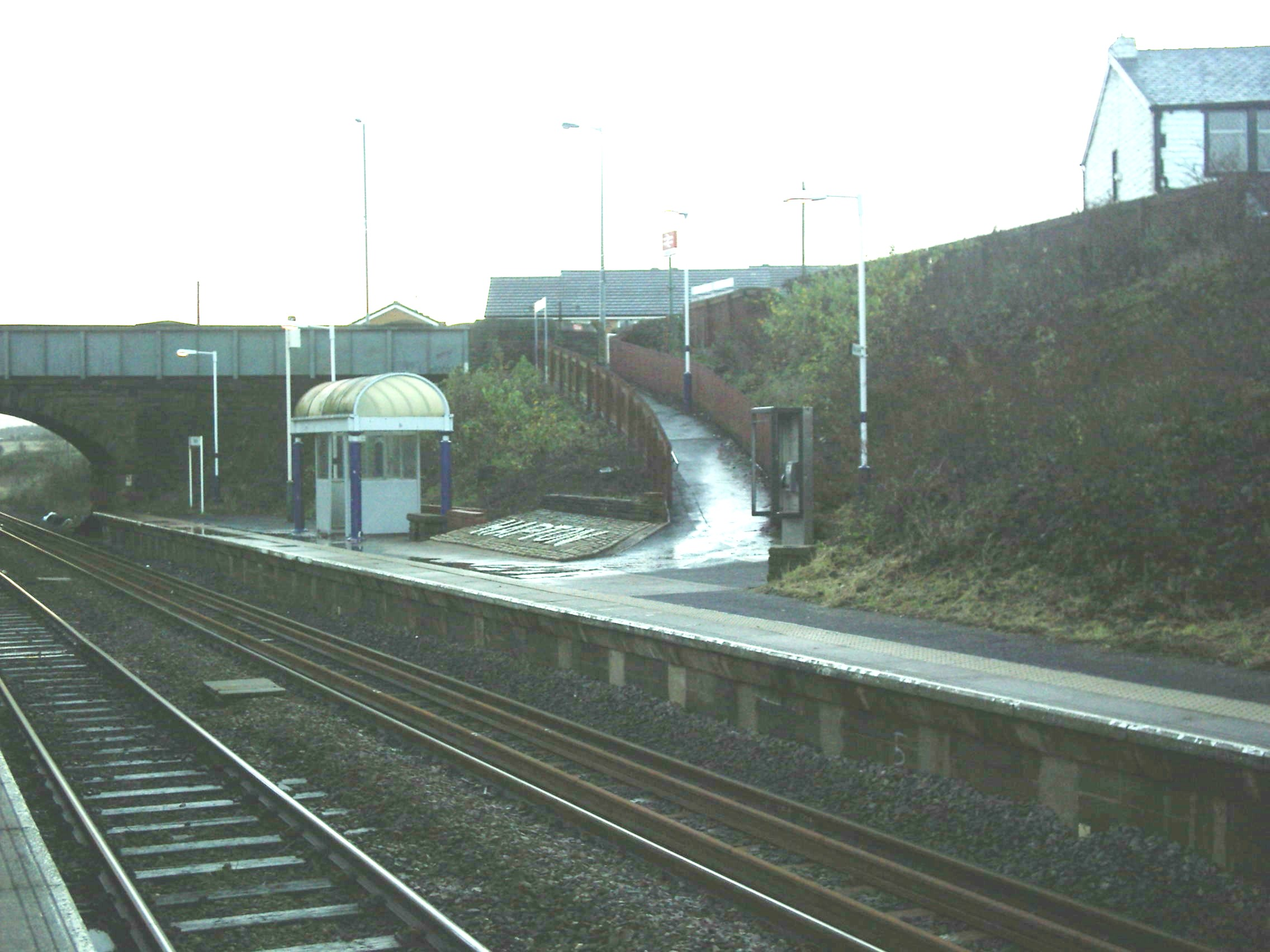

General information
- Location: Hapton, Burnley; England
- Coordinates: 53.782°N 2.317°W
- Grid reference: SD791317
- Manager: Northern Trains
- Platforms: 2

Other information
- Station code: HPN
- Classification: DfT category F2

History
- Original company: East Lancashire Railway
- Pre-grouping: Lancashire and Yorkshire Railway
- Post-grouping: London, Midland and Scottish Railway

Key dates
- c. 1860: Opened

Passengers
- 2021/22: ▲14,330
- 2022/23: ▼12,002
- 2023/24: ▲12,868
- 2024/25: ▲13,360
- 2025/26: ▲14,512
Location
Notes
- Passenger statistics from the Office of Rail and Road

Hapton railway station serves the village of Hapton 3 miles (5 km) west of Burnley Central railway station on the East Lancashire Line operated by Northern Trains. It is unstaffed. Between 2004–5 and 2005–6, passenger usage fell by 21%, but in the years since, it has risen again by more than 60%.

The station has only basic facilities available, the standard plexiglass shelters, passenger information screens and PA system, with no permanent buildings. It is fully accessible for disabled travellers, via ramps from the nearby main road to each platform.

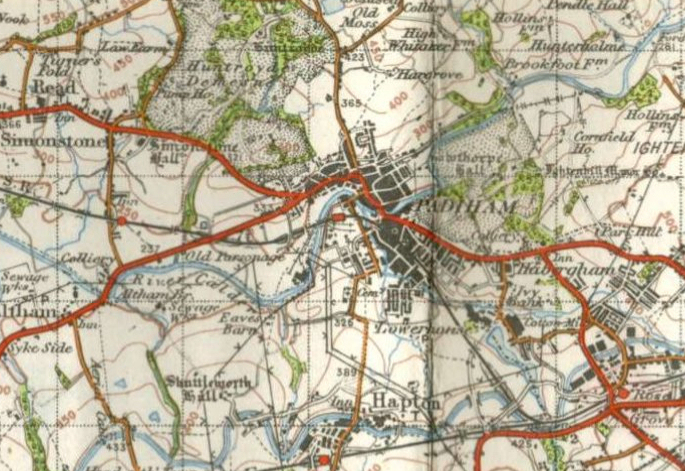
1948 Ordnance Survey map showing Hapton station close to the lower edge

== Services ==
Monday to Saturday, there is an hourly service from Hapton to Burnley and Colne (eastbound) and Preston via Accrington and Blackburn (westbound). On Sundays, there is a two-hourly service in each direction, with through running to and from Blackpool South.

On 14 May 2012, Hapton became a request only stop, along with Huncoat, Burnley Barracks and Pleasington. Since December 2025 the station returned to being a regular scheduled stop

Preceding station	National Rail	Following station
Huncoat	Northern Trains East Lancashire Line	Rose Grove
	Historical railways	
Huncoat Line and station open	Lancashire and Yorkshire Railway East Lancashire Railway	Rose Grove Line and station open
