= Nelson railway station =

Railway station in Lancashire, England

Coordinates: 53.835°N 2.214°W

Nelson
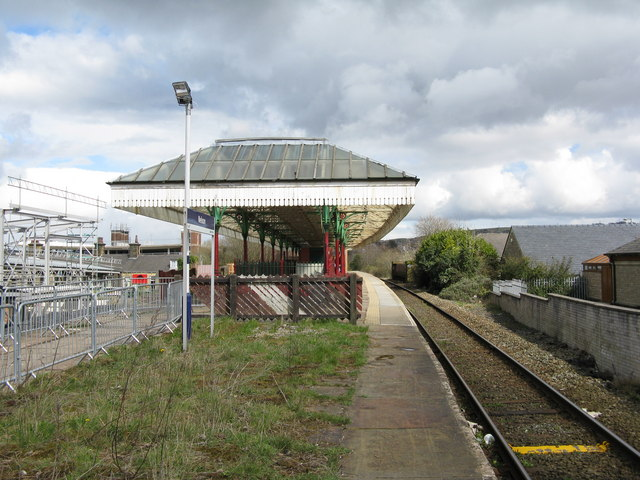
- Nelson railway station in 2008

General information
- Location: Nelson, Pendle; England
- Grid reference: SD860376
- Manager: Northern Trains
- Platforms: 1

Other information
- Station code: NEL
- Classification: DfT category F1

History
- Opened: 1849; 177 years ago

Passengers
- 2020/21: ▼28,748
- 2021/22: ▲90,644
- 2022/23: ▼90,272
- 2023/24: ▲0.105 million
- 2024/25: ▲0.114 million
Location
Notes
- Passenger statistics from the Office of Rail and Road

Nelson railway station serves the town of Nelson in Lancashire, England; it is situated on the East Lancashire Line, 2 miles (3 km) away from the terminus at Colne. The station is managed by Northern Trains, which also provides its passenger service.

== History ==
The station was opened on 1 February 1849 by the East Lancashire Railway, which later became part of the Lancashire & Yorkshire Railway. It was named after the Nelson Inn at Marsden, the public house adjacent to the station.

It was not until later in the nineteenth century that Nelson came into existence as a town; it was previously two separate villages called Great Marsden and Little Marsden. The line was formerly on a through route to Skipton and the Aire Valley, but this was closed beyond Colne in 1970.

The station forms part of Nelson Interchange, which also includes a new bus station, which opened in December 2008, adjacent to the now disused eastbound platform. The station originally had an island platform configuration, but only the westbound face is now used following the singling of the track southwards to Rose Grove in December 1986. The station retains its original platform canopy.

== Facilities ==
The station is still staffed on a part-time basis by the local Tourist Information office, which located here. Full step-free access is available, with ramps and a lift to/from platform level to the main entrance, plus a level walkway to the bus station building.

== Services ==
On Mondays to Saturdays, there is an hourly service from Nelson towards Burnley Central, Accrington, Blackburn and Preston (westbound) and to Colne (eastbound). There is a two-hourly service in each direction on Sundays, with through running to Blackpool South westbound.

| Preceding station | National Rail | Following station |
|---|---|---|
| Brierfield | Northern Trains East Lancashire Line | Colne |
Historical railways
| Brierfield Line and station open | Lancashire and Yorkshire Railway East Lancashire Railway | Bott Lane Halt Line open, station closed |

== Bibliography ==
- Marshall, Geoff; Pipe, Vicki (2018). The Railway Adventures: Places, Trains, People and Stations. September Publishing. ISBN 978-1910463871.
