= Huncoat railway station =

Railway station in Lancashire, England

Huncoat
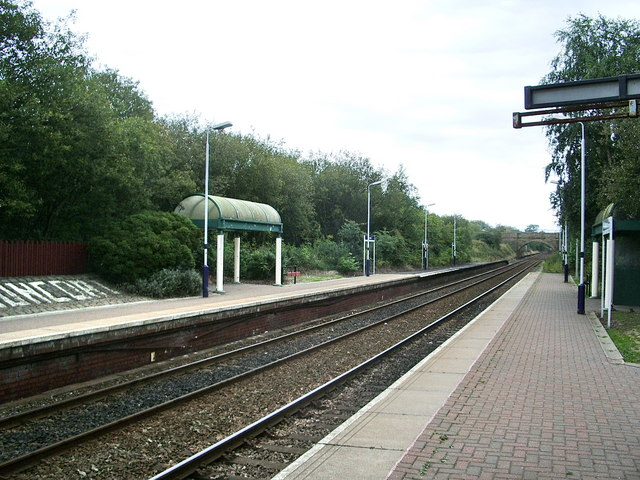

General information
- Location: Huncoat, Hyndburn; England
- Coordinates: 53.772°N 2.346°W
- Grid reference: SD772307
- Manager: Northern Trains
- Platforms: 2

Other information
- Station code: HCT
- Classification: DfT category F2

History
- Original company: East Lancashire Railway
- Pre-grouping: Lancashire and Yorkshire Railway
- Post-grouping: London Midland and Scottish Railway

Key dates
- 18 September 1848: Opened
- 1902 or 1880s: Relocated 745 m south

Passengers
- 2021/22: ▲23,036
- 2022/23: ▲24,244
- 2023/24: ▲25,244
- 2024/25: ▼24,574
- 2025/26: ▼22,258
Location
Notes
- Passenger statistics from the Office of Rail and Road

Huncoat railway station is a railway station which serves the village of Huncoat, between Accrington and Burnley in Lancashire, England. The station is 8 miles (13 km) east of Blackburn railway station on the East Lancashire Line operated by Northern Trains.

The village's first station was opened in September 1848 by the East Lancashire Railway slightly to the east, but it was relocated to its present site by the Lancashire and Yorkshire Railway in 1902. or 1880s A nearby colliery and power station were both served by the station and railway for many years, but the pit closed in 1968 and the power plant in 1984. The site is now a nature trail.

The distinctive tall signal box, that once supervised the colliery sidings, avoided closure when the line was re-signalled in 1973, being retained to supervised the level crossing at the west end of the station. It was finally closed in November 2014, and subsequently demolished when the crossing was automated.

The station is unstaffed, with ticket vending facilities, There are shelters on each platform and step-free access to each one; along with passenger information screens and a long line PA system to provide running details to passengers.

== Services ==
Monday to Saturday, there is an hourly service from Huncoat to Burnley and Colne (eastbound) and Preston via Accrington and Blackburn (westbound). On Sundays, there is a two-hourly service in each direction, with through running to and from Blackpool South.

Between 14 May 2012 and 10 July 2013, Huncoat was a request stop.

Preceding station	National Rail	Following station
Accrington	Northern Trains East Lancashire Line	Hapton
	Historical railways	
Accrington Line and station open	Lancashire and Yorkshire Railway East Lancashire Railway	Hapton Line and station open
