= Rose Grove railway station =

Railway station in Burnley, Lancashire, England

Coordinates: 53.787°N 2.282°W

Rose Grove
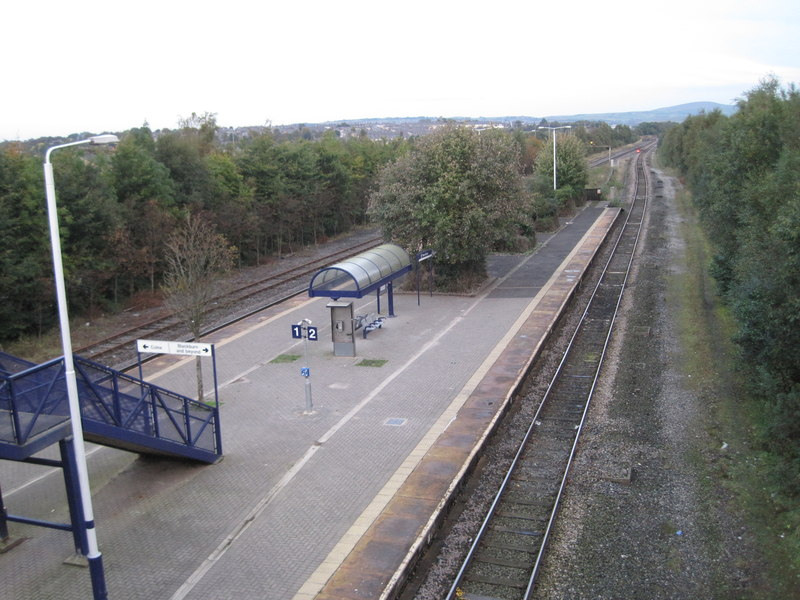
- Rose Grove railway station in 2012

General information
- Location: Burnley, Burnley; England
- Grid reference: SD815322
- Manager: Northern Trains
- Platforms: 2

Other information
- Station code: RSG
- Classification: DfT category F1

History
- Original company: East Lancashire Railway
- Pre-grouping: Lancashire and Yorkshire Railway
- Post-grouping: London, Midland and Scottish Railway

Key dates
- 18 September 1848: Station opened

Passengers
- 2020/21: ▼18,534
- Interchange: 667
- 2021/22: ▲52,788
- Interchange: ▲1,566
- 2022/23: ▲59,934
- Interchange: ▲2,190
- 2023/24: ▲67,456
- Interchange: ▲3,329
- 2024/25: ▲73,300
- Interchange: ▲5,674
Location
Notes
- Passenger statistics from the Office of Rail and Road

Rose Grove railway station in Lancashire, England serves the Rose Grove area in the west of Burnley, and the nearby town of Padiham. It is served by both the Calder Valley Line and the East Lancashire Line. It was once the terminus of the Great Harwood Loop between Blackburn and Burnley via Great Harwood and Padiham. The station is now a junction station for both the Calder Valley and East Lancashire lines.

== History ==
The railway reached Rose Grove in 1848, and the East Lancashire Railway Company built the station to serve the Rose Grove area together with the town of Padiham, a slight distance away. Rose Grove was formerly the site of an engine shed, which was one of the last to house steam locomotives on British Railways. The station became unstaffed in the 1980s, following the demolition of the station buildings.

The last remnants of the Great Harwood Loop towards Padiham have also disappeared, the line having been closed in 1993 with the end of oil traffic to the power station there. The site is now occupied by the M65 motorway, which runs beside the railway at this point. During the mid to late 1980s, Rose Grove was the starting point for an Inter City "Holidaymaker" Saturday service; in the 1989 timetable this ran as the 06:50 to Paignton via Preston and Birmingham New Street, leaving Paignton at 14:10 for the return journey.

== Services ==
In the spring 2023 timetable, the station has two services per hour in each direction Mondays to Saturdays. One runs between Colne and Preston (the East Lancashire Line), whilst the other runs between Blackburn and Manchester Victoria via Burnley Manchester Road and Todmorden (this resumed in 2015, after an absence of 50 years). Many of the latter services continue west of Manchester to Wigan Wallgate and Headbolt Lane where they meet the terminus of Merseyrail's Northern Line towards Liverpool.

On Sundays, the East Lancashire service drops to two-hourly (but running through to/from Blackpool South) while the service to/from Manchester remains hourly (and continues to Southport).

Preceding station	National Rail	Following station
Hapton	Northern Trains East Lancashire Line	Burnley Barracks
Accrington	Northern Trains Calder Valley Line	Burnley Manchester Road
	Historical railways	
Hapton Line and station open	Lancashire and Yorkshire Railway East Lancashire Railway	Burnley Barracks Line and station open
Hapton Line and station open	Lancashire and Yorkshire Railway Copy Pit Line	Burnley Manchester Road Line and station open
Disused railways
Padiham Line and station closed	Lancashire and Yorkshire Railway Great Harwood Loop	Terminus
