= Accrington railway station =

Railway station in Lancashire, England

Accrington
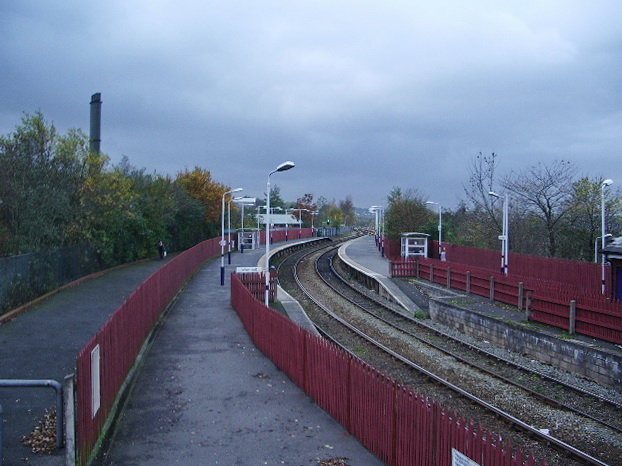

General information
- Location: Accrington, Hyndburn, England
- Coordinates: 53.753°N 2.370°W
- Grid reference: SD757285
- Manager: Northern Trains
- Platforms: 2

Other information
- Station code: ACR
- Classification: DfT category E

History
- Original company: East Lancashire Railway
- Pre-grouping: Lancashire & Yorkshire Railway
- Post-grouping: London, Midland & Scottish Railway

Key dates
- 19 June 1848: Station opens

Passengers
- 2020/21: ▼0.119 million
- 2021/22: ▲0.386 million
- 2022/23: ▲0.460 million
- 2023/24: ▲0.474 million
- 2024/25: ▲0.504 million
Location
Notes
- Passenger statistics from the Office of Rail & Road

Accrington railway station serves the town of Accrington, in Lancashire, England. It lies on the East Lancashire line, 15 miles 64 chains (25.4 km) from Farington Curve Junction (where the line meets the West Coast Main Line), and is also served by the Calder Valley Line. Geographically, it is located between Church & Oswaldtwistle and Huncoat.

== History ==
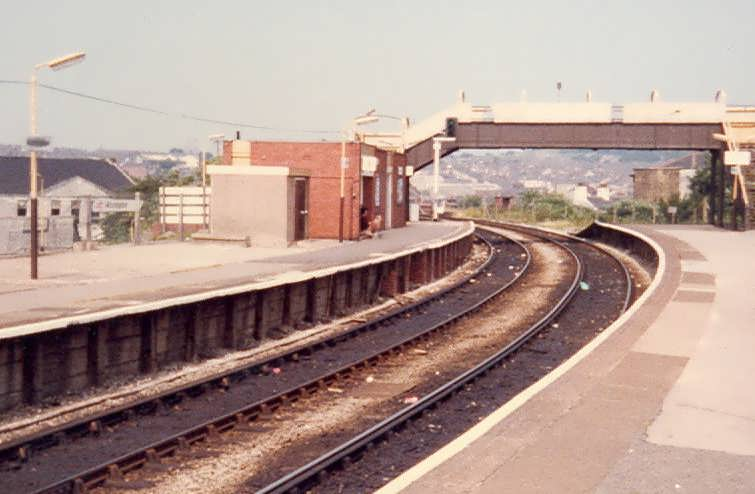
The station seen in 1983

The station was opened on 10 June 1848 by the East Lancashire Railway, which amalgamated with the Lancashire & Yorkshire Railway in 1859.

The station was formerly a major junction on the ELR, with the line to Bury Bolton Street and Salford Central diverging southwards from that towards Blackburn and Preston at the western end of the station, just before the viaduct that carries the line over the town centre. For many years, this was a busy commuter route carrying regular trains from Skipton and Colne to Manchester Victoria, but it fell victim to the Beeching cuts in the 1960s and was closed to passengers on 5 December 1966.

== Facilities ==
The station has two side platforms, either side of the twin-tracked railway line. Other than three small shelters (two on platform 2 and one on platform 1), there is no protection from the elements. It offers disabled access via ramps adjacent to the platforms. There is a ticket office and ticket machine, a car park, bicycle spaces and an accessible toilet.

In 2011, the station underwent a major rebuild, as part of a project to create a model of sustainable energy use for a railway station. This redevelopment cost £2 million, of which £500,000 was funded by the European Union's Interreg IVB programme. The previous ticket office was demolished, and was replaced by a new build and constructed, where possible, with local materials including recycled stone. The building uses a rainwater harvesting system, photovoltaic cells and solar hot water generation panels on the new tower.

== Passenger volume ==
Passenger Volume at Accrington
	2002–03	2004–05	2005–06	2006–07	2007–08	2008–09	2009–10	2010–11	2011–12	2012–13	2013–14	2014–15	2015–16	2016–17	2017–18	2018–19	2019–20	2020–21	2021–22	2022–23
Entries and exits	179,836	216,059	224,452	236,668	259,944	275,652	279,442	313,382	345,666	363,546	369,726	382,678	433,618	460,472	459,408	422,806	465,758	119,210	385,604	459,616

The statistics cover twelve month periods that start in April.

== Services ==
After a gap of almost fifty years, direct services to Manchester Victoria resumed from May 2015, with the reopening of the Todmorden Curve. These start at Blackburn and continue onwards through Burnley Manchester Road, using the Caldervale Line south of Todmorden, to reach Rochdale and Manchester. An hourly service each way operates on this route throughout the week. Most of these trains continue beyond Manchester, to Wigan Wallgate and Headbolt Lane or Southport (Sundays only)

As of May 2025, the weekday off-peak service pattern in trains per hour (tph) is as follows:

- 1 tph to Blackpool North, via Blackburn, Preston and Poulton-le-Fylde
- 1 tph to Preston, via Church & Oswaldtwistle, Blackburn and Bamber Bridge
- 1 tph to Blackburn
- 1 tph to York, via Hebden Bridge, Bradford Interchange and Leeds
- 1 tph to Headbolt Lane, via Rochdale, Manchester Victoria and Wigan Wallgate
- 1 tph to Colne, via Rose Grove, Burnley Central and Nelson.

The service between Blackpool North and York has operated hourly on Sundays since the May 2009 timetable change.

Preceding station	National Rail	Following station
Church & Oswaldtwistle	Northern Trains East Lancashire Line	Huncoat
Blackburn	Northern Trains Calder Valley Line	Rose Grove
	Disused railways	
Church & Oswaldtwistle Line and station open	Lancashire and Yorkshire Railway East Lancashire Railway	Huncoat Line and station open
Baxenden Line and station closed	Lancashire and Yorkshire Railway East Lancashire Railway	Huncoat Line and station open

== Bibliography ==
- Broadbridge, Seymour (2006), Studies in railway expansion and the capital market in England 1825-1873, Taylor & Francis, ISBN 0-415-38216-5
- Butt, R. V. J. (October 1995). The Directory of Railway Stations: details every public and private passenger station, halt, platform and stopping place, past and present (1st ed.). Sparkford: Patrick Stephens Ltd. ISBN 978-1-85260-508-7. OCLC 60251199. OL 11956311M.
- Jowett, Alan (2000). Jowett's Nationalised Railway Atlas (1st ed.). Penryn, Cornwall: Atlantic Transport Publishers. ISBN 978-0-906899-99-1. OCLC 228266687.
- Marshall, J. (1981) Forgotten Railways: North-West England, David & Charles, Newton Abbott. ISBN 0-7153-8003-6
