= Blackburn railway station =

Railway station in Lancashire, England

Coordinates: 53.746396°N 2.479083°W

Blackburn
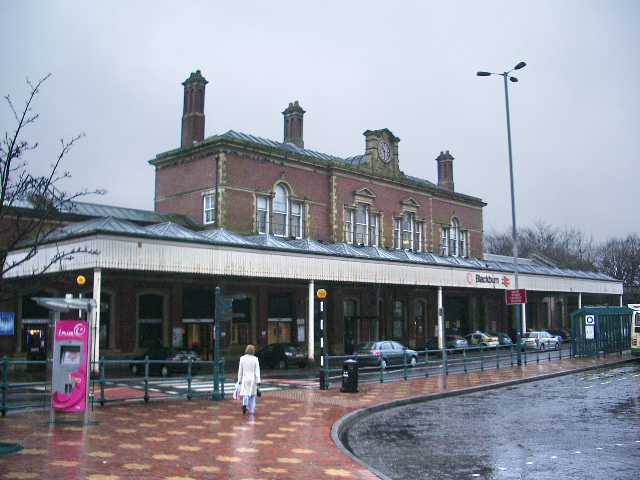

General information
- Location: Blackburn, Blackburn with Darwen; England
- Grid reference: SD684279
- Manager: Northern Trains
- Platforms: 4

Other information
- Station code: BBN
- Classification: DfT category C1

History
- Original company: Blackburn and Preston Railway
- Pre-grouping: Lancashire and Yorkshire Railway
- Post-grouping: London, Midland and Scottish Railway

Key dates
- 1 June 1846: Opened

Passengers
- 2020/21: ▼0.393 million
- Interchange: ▼18,790
- 2021/22: ▲1.065 million
- Interchange: ▲62,210
- 2022/23: ▲1.202 million
- Interchange: ▲71,203
- 2023/24: ▲1.245 million
- Interchange: ▲75,205
- 2024/25: ▲1.298 million
- Interchange: ▲82,591
Location
Notes
- Passenger statistics from the Office of Rail and Road

Blackburn railway station serves the town of Blackburn, in Lancashire, England. It is 12 miles (19 km) east of Preston; it is managed and served by Northern Trains.

== History ==
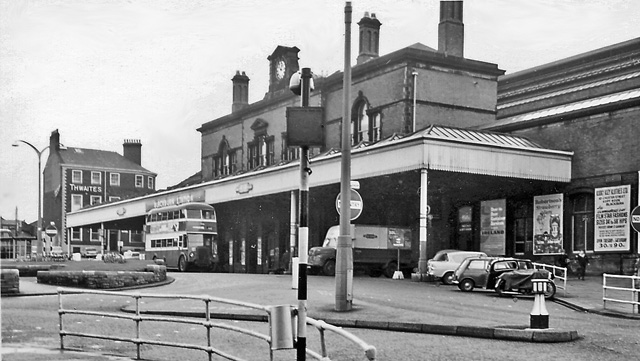
Exterior view in 1965

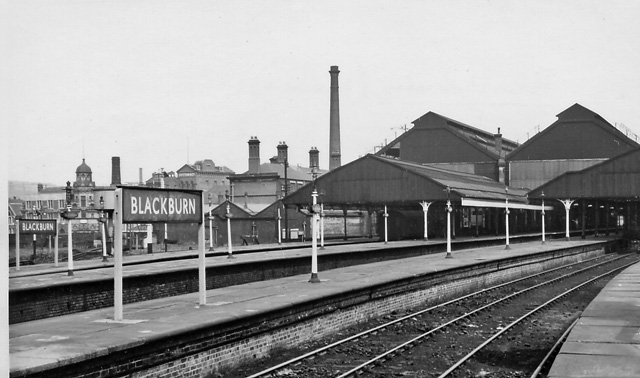
View looking north-east towards Burnley and Hellifield in 1965

There has been a station on the current site since 1846, when the Blackburn and Preston Railway (a constituent company of the East Lancashire Railway) was opened; the contract to build the station having been awarded in November 1845. This route was extended eastwards to Accrington in March 1848 and subsequently through to Burnley and Colne by February 1849.

Meanwhile, the Bolton, Blackburn, Clitheroe & West Yorkshire Railway had built a line through to Bolton from the town by 1848, but were refused permission to use the ELR station and had to open their own station at Bolton Road, a short distance south of the junction between the two. The Blackburn company subsequently extended their line northwards along the Ribble Valley to Clitheroe in 1851, but it was not until both railways had amalgamated with the Lancashire and Yorkshire Railway that traffic was concentrated at the main station (the Bolton Road station closing in 1859).

The first of two major upgrades to the facilities came the following year, but the opening of the Lancashire Union Railway from St Helens Central and Wigan North Western in 1869, the Great Harwood Loop in 1877 and the extension of the Clitheroe line to Hellifield in 1880 to give the L&Y a through route to Scotland via the Settle-Carlisle Line led to significant increases in traffic that put the station under major strain. A fatal collision there that led to the deaths of 7 people in 1881 prompted the L&Y to make plans for another expansion & remodelling project, which was completed between 1886 & 1888. The new station had two island platforms, each with west-facing bays to give seven working faces in total, plus an impressive two-bay overall roof. Destinations served included Liverpool Exchange via Ormskirk, Blackpool Central, Skipton, and Southport via the West Lancashire Railway, in addition to those mentioned previously. Long distance through coaches to Scotland and London Euston (via Manchester Victoria, Denton and Stockport) also operated from here well into British Rail days.

The 1923 Grouping saw the station pass into the hands of the London, Midland and Scottish Railway, but it was not until after nationalisation in 1948 that traffic and services began to decline. The Great Harwood line was the first to lose its passenger services in 1957, whilst the through coaches to London were suspended temporarily in 1959 for electrification work to take place on the Crewe-Manchester line; these were never reinstated. The biggest losses came though in the 1960s; Wigan Wallgate trains were withdrawn in January 1960, those to Hellifield in September 1962, and the Southport line & Blackpool Central both fell victim to the Beeching Axe in 1964.

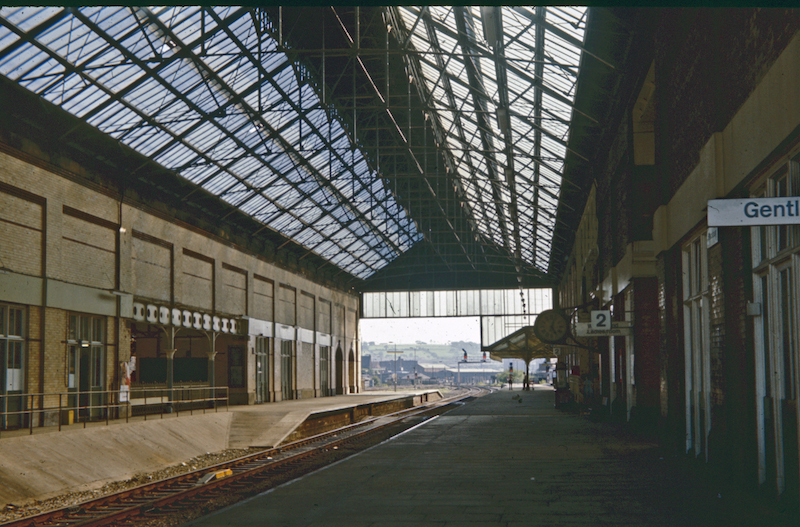
Interior, with original overall roof, now removed, seen in 1976

By 1970, the through links to Skipton and Liverpool had also gone, leaving only the Manchester via Bolton and Colne to Preston lines, along with a few seasonal trains between Leeds and Blackpool North via Hebden Bridge and the Copy Pit route to serve the station. Thus, when the lines & station were resignalled in 1973 (control passed to the new power box at Preston as part of the WCML modernisation scheme), three of the station's seven platforms were closed and a fourth (the current platform 4) reduced in length and downgraded to emergency use only. The remaining trains could quite easily be accommodated on platforms 1-3 (the northernmost island of the two). This method of operation would remain until the station underwent its most recent major rebuild in 2000 (see below).

The 1980s and 90s would though see a revival in service provision, with the reopening to regular passenger traffic of the Copy Pit line in 1984 (initially on a twice-daily trial basis with services funded by a local building society) and the Ribble Valley line to Clitheroe a decade later in 1994. The latter would be served as an extension of the existing route from Manchester via Bolton, whilst the former brought regular services to & from Blackpool, Leeds and York to the station for the first time in more than a decade.

== Description ==
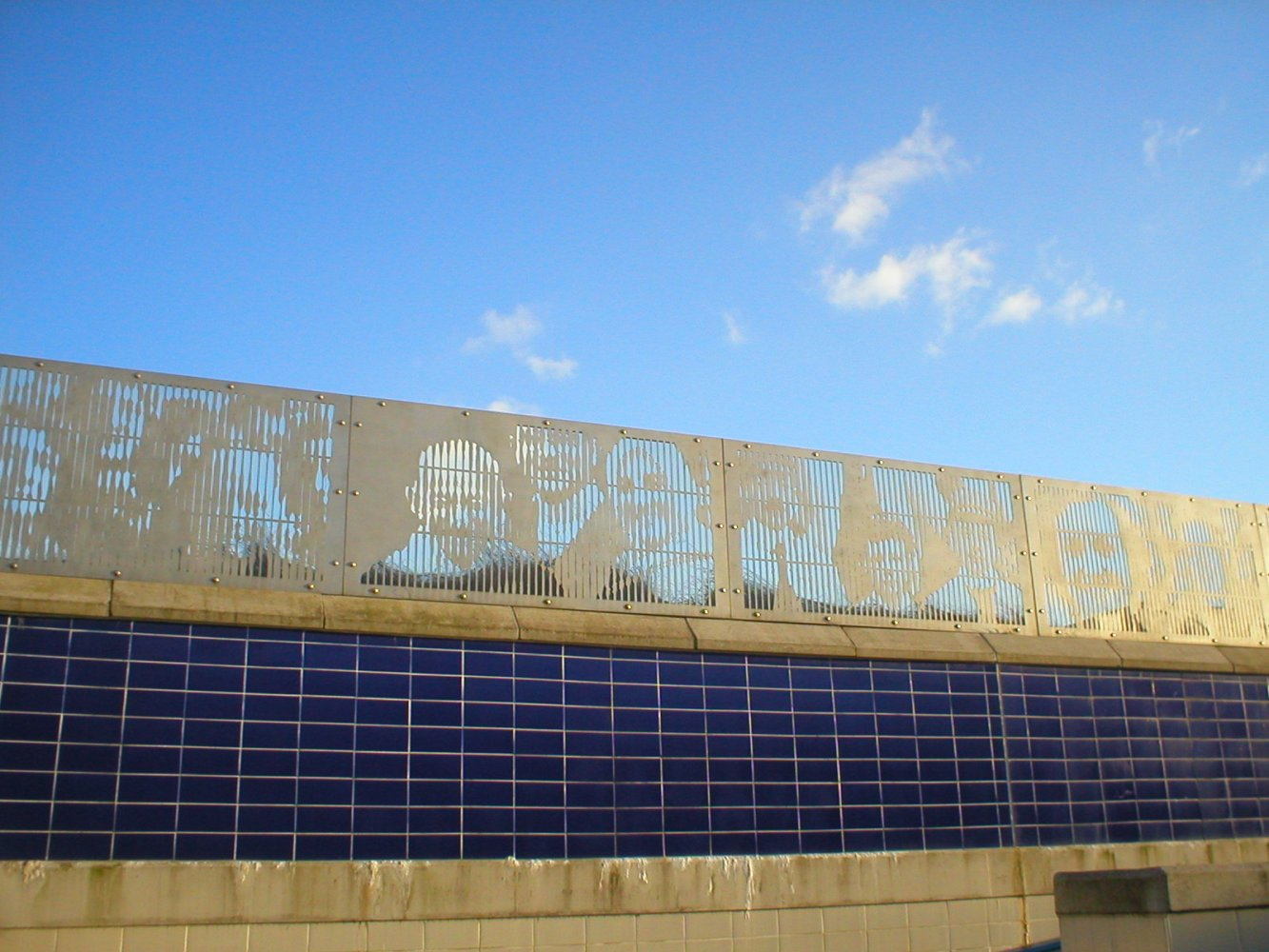
Artwork by Stephen Charnock on platform 4

The station is currently served by two lines:

- One line runs north–south, comprising the reopened Ribble Valley Line from Clitheroe in the north and continuing through Blackburn towards Darwen, Bolton and terminating at Manchester Victoria.
- The other line runs east–west and is served by trains from Blackpool South and Preston in the west travelling to Burnley (Manchester Road and Central), Colne (the East Lancashire Line), Leeds and as far as York in the east (the Calder Valley Line).

The station was covered by twin train sheds, an architecturally detailed canopy that covered all platforms. In 2000, due to its decaying state, it was removed, changing the nature of the station in a £35 million regeneration project. A new building was built on the main island platform. The Grade II listed original entrance built in the 1880s, including the station buffet and former booking hall, was retained and refurbished.

A piece of public artwork by artist Stephen Charnock was also erected at the edge of the platform, which consists of a stainless steel screen depicting Blackburn's industrial past and its more modern life today. The images include some of Blackburn's most successful figures and famous visitors such as David Lloyd George (Liberal politician), Mahatma Gandhi (campaigner for Indian independence), Kathleen Ferrier (singer), Barbara Castle (Labour politician), Carl Fogarty (superbike racer), Wayne Hemingway (fashion designer) and Jack Walker (businessman). Platform 4, which had previously not been in timetabled use since the 1970s, was reopened for regular services as part of the work.

In 2003, a police station was opened in the upper floor of the old booking hall to provide services in the town centre when the town's main police station was replaced by Greenbank police station in Whitebirk.

The station is well connected with public transport in Blackburn; the Blackburn Boulevard bus station (recently closed and moved to the old market site) was situated directly in front of the station building. In 2016 a new interchange opened outside the station with frequent buses heading to the new bus station.

In April 2011, £1.7 million was raised for the construction of a canopy on platform 4 and a lift to the subway below. From the refurbishment of the station 10 years earlier, only bus style shelters had been provided with no lift access.

On 24 October 2011, the rebuild of platform 4 was completed, now boasting a roof matching the one on platforms 1 and 2, lift, heated waiting room and improved flooring.

New LED departure information display screens have also been installed.

== Facilities ==
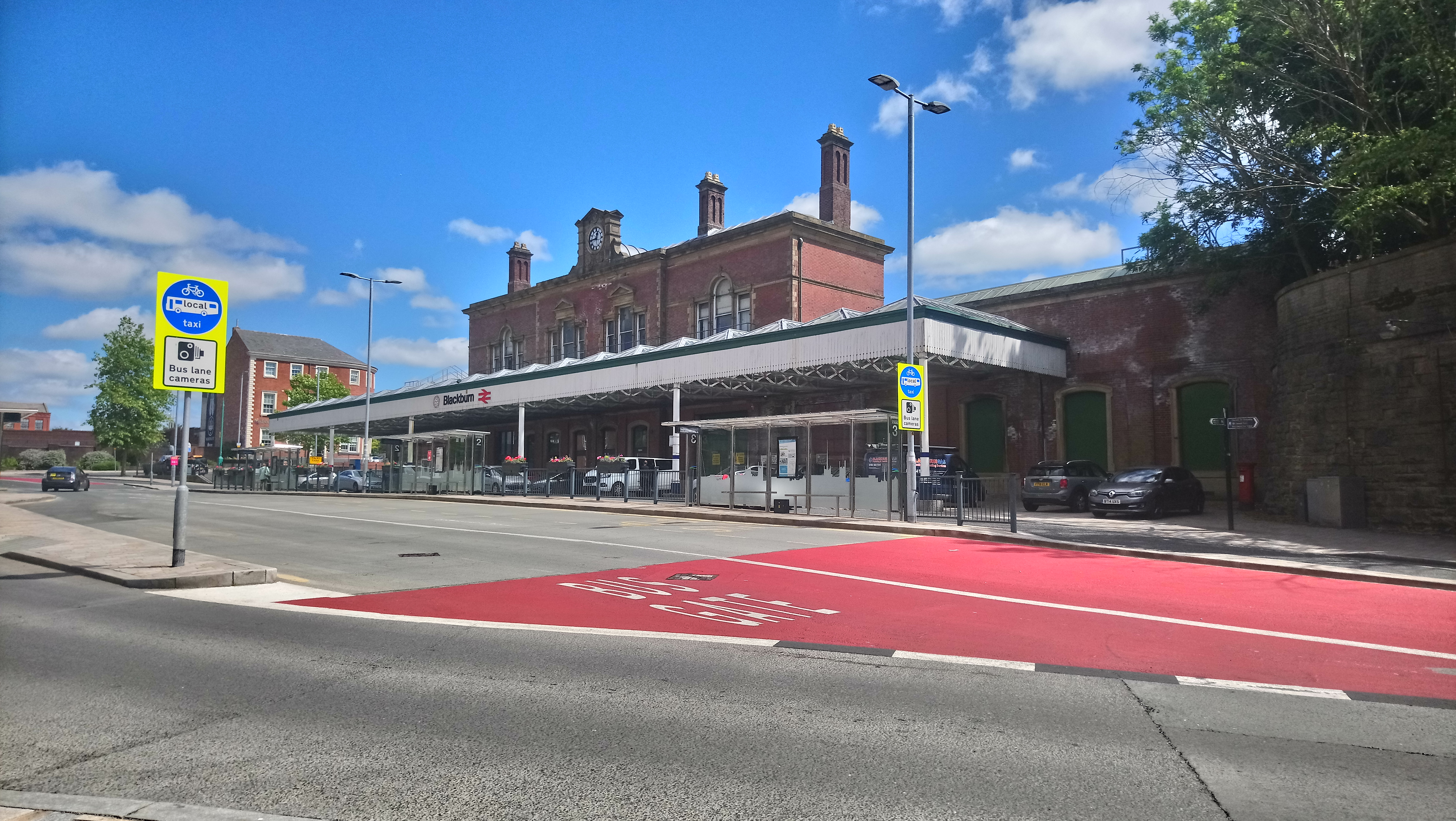
The station frontage

The station has four platforms. The main platform (platforms 1,2 & 3) includes a ticket office, waiting room, toilets and outdoor seating. The separate platform 4 has a heated waiting room and outdoor seating.

All three through platforms are bi-directional, meaning that any service can use any platform; however, most trains are booked on the following platforms:

Platform	Line	Destination
1	Ribble Valley Line	Clitheroe
1 or 2	via Todmorden Curve	Manchester Victoria via Todmorden
2	Calder Valley Line	Express service to York
2	East Lancashire Line	Colne
3		West-facing bay platform used mainly for hourly trains to Manchester Victoria, via Bolton
4	East Lancashire Line	Preston and Blackpool South
4	Calder Valley Line	Express service to Blackpool North
4	Ribble Valley Line	Rochdale

The ticket office is staffed throughout the week (06:40-18:00 Mondays to Thursdays, 06:40-19:00 Fridays and Saturdays, 09:10-16:40 Sundays). A self-service ticket machine is available for use when the booking office is closed and for collecting pre-paid/advance purchase tickets. There is also a station kiosk on the concourse at the front of the station where rail users can purchase refreshments.

== Services ==
Northern Trains operates services on three lines:

- Ribble Valley Line: there is a half-hourly service southbound to Manchester Victoria and hourly northbound to Clitheroe, with peak time extras. An hourly service runs on Sundays. Additional services to/from Manchester Victoria and Clitheroe start or terminate here. The off-peak Monday to Saturday frequency over this route south of Blackburn has been improved to two trains per hour.
- East Lancashire Line: Monday to Saturdays there is an hourly service all stops to Preston to the west and Colne to the east. Two-hourly on Sundays, with through running to Blackpool South.
- Calder Valley Line: Monday to Saturdays there is an hourly express service to Blackpool North westbound and to Bradford Interchange, Leeds and York eastbound; this also runs on Sundays, albeit with a later start time. From 17 May 2015, direct services to Manchester Victoria through Accrington and Burnley were introduced with the reopening of the Todmorden Curve; these run on an hourly frequency and serve most local stations south of Todmorden. In the May 2023 timetable, these trains continue beyond Manchester to Headbolt Lane in Kirkby via Wigan Wallgate (to Southport on Sundays) where there are connections via Merseyrail to Liverpool Central.

Preceding station	National Rail	Following station
Mill Hill	Northern Trains; East Lancashire Line	Rishton
Preston or Mill Hill (Peak hours only)	Northern Trains; Caldervale Line	Accrington
Terminus	Northern Trains; Caldervale Line (Sundays only)	Church and Oswaldtwistle
Ramsgreave & Wilpshire or Terminus	Northern Trains; Ribble Valley Line	Darwen
	Historical railways	
Mill Hill; Line and station open	Lancashire and Yorkshire Railway; Blackburn and Preston Railway; East Lancashire Railway	Rishton; Line and station open
Daisyfield; Line open, station closed	Lancashire and Yorkshire Railway; Blackburn Railway	Lower Darwen; Line open, station closed
Mill Hill	L&YR / LNWR joint Lancashire Union Railway	Terminus
	Disused railways	
Terminus	Lancashire and Yorkshire Railway; Great Harwood Loop	Great Harwood; Line and station closed

== See also ==
- Listed buildings in Blackburn
