= Burnley Central railway station =

Railway station in Lancashire, England

Coordinates: 53.794°N 2.245°W

Burnley Central
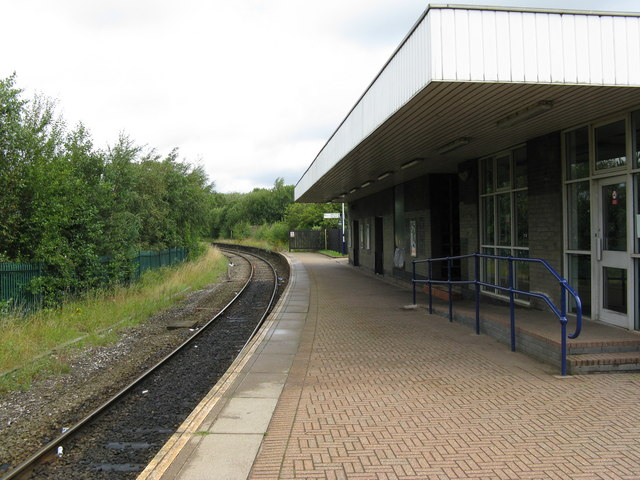

General information
- Location: Burnley, Burnley; England
- Grid reference: SD839330
- Managed by: Northern Trains
- Platforms: 1

Other information
- Station code: BNC
- Classification: DfT category E

Key dates
- 1 December 1848: Station opened
- November 1871: Renamed Burnley Bank Top
- 2 October 1944: Renamed Burnley Central
- 1964: Station rebuilt

Passengers
- 2020/21: ▼28,804
- 2021/22: ▲99,658
- 2022/23: ▲0.100 million
- 2023/24: ▼94,256
- 2024/25: ▲0.115 million
Location
Notes
- Passenger statistics from the Office of Rail and Road

Burnley Central railway station is a stop on the East Lancashire Line, which serves the town of Burnley, in Lancashire, England. It is managed by Northern Trains, which also provides its passenger service.

== History ==
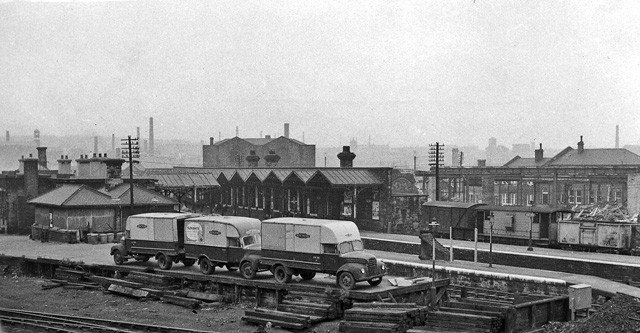
The station in 1962

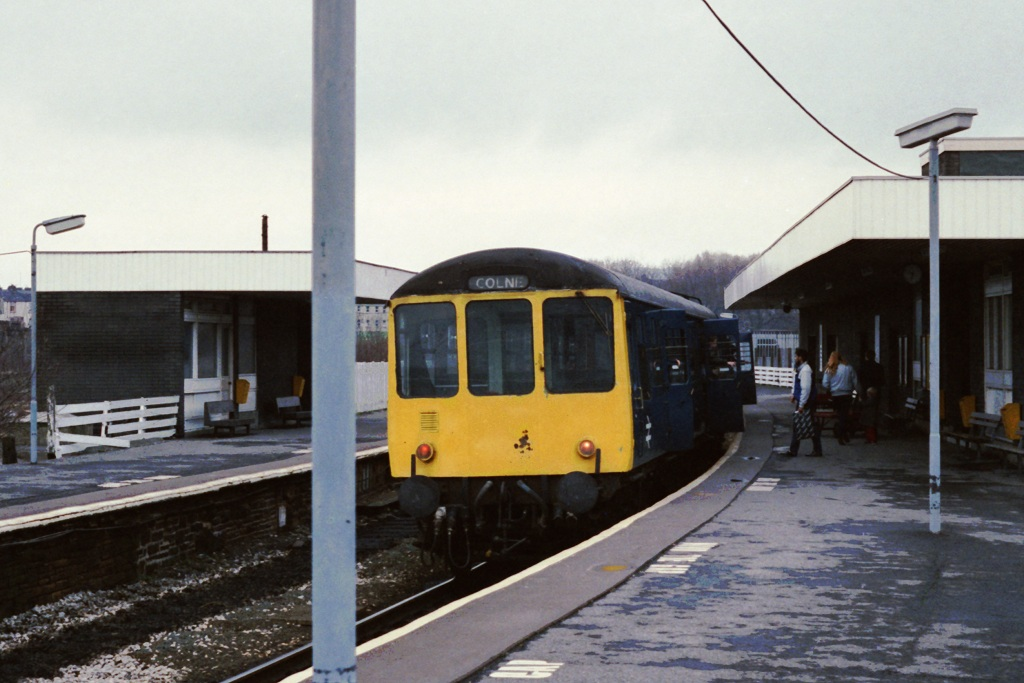
The station in 1988

The station was opened by the East Lancashire Railway in 1848, as part of its route from Bury and Blackburn to Colne; here, an end-on junction was made with the Leeds and Bradford Extension Railway line from Skipton that had been completed several months earlier. The service from Colne through the station to Manchester Victoria, via Accrington and Bury, was well used from the outset by the owners of the local cotton mills, who travelled from their homes in the area to make their purchases of raw cotton at the Royal Exchange several times each week. It was also possible to travel from the station by direct train to Blackpool, Liverpool and Skipton and even through to London Euston, via Blackburn, Manchester Victoria and Stockport.

However, the cutbacks of the 1960s affected the station badly, with through trains to Manchester via Bury ending in 1964 (two years before the withdrawal of the Accrington to Bury service) and those to Liverpool in 1969 whilst the line to Skipton was closed to all traffic in 1970. This left the station on a 6 1/2 miles (10.5 km)-long dead-end branch line from Rose Grove to Colne, although the line remained double as far as Nelson until December 1986. The eastbound line and platform, used by trains towards Colne, was taken out of use thereafter and the station signal box closed; the track was subsequently lifted and the box and platform demolished a few years later. Only part of the remaining (former westbound) platform is now used by passenger trains; the rest is fenced off and overgrown. Immediately to the west, the line passes above the centre of the town on Bank Top viaduct as it heads towards Gannow Junction.

Despite the cutbacks, the station was rebuilt in 1965. Its ground floor is at street level and the first floor at platform level. It provides a booking hall, toilets, waiting rooms, stationmaster's office, parcels office and left luggage office.

== Facilities ==
Following the singling of the track in December 1986, Burnley Central has only one platform in use. There is a small ticket office, waiting area and public address facility. There are information boards at the entrance of the station and in the booking hall, along with passenger information screens on the platform. The booking office is staffed on weekday mornings and early afternoons only; at other times, tickets can be purchased from a ticket vending machine on the concourse.

It is fully accessible to disabled travellers, with a ramp from the entrance to the waiting room/ticket office and platform.

== Services ==
On weekdays and Saturdays, Northern Trains operates an hourly service in each direction between Colne (eastbound) and Preston (westbound). On Sundays, there is a two-hourly service in each direction, with most westbound services continuing on to Blackpool South.

Preceding station	National Rail	Following station
Burnley Barracks	Northern Trains East Lancashire Line	Brierfield
Historical railways
Burnley Barracks Line and station open	Lancashire and Yorkshire Railway East Lancashire Railway	New Hall Bridge Halt Line open, station closed
