= East Lancashire line =

Railway line in Lancashire, England

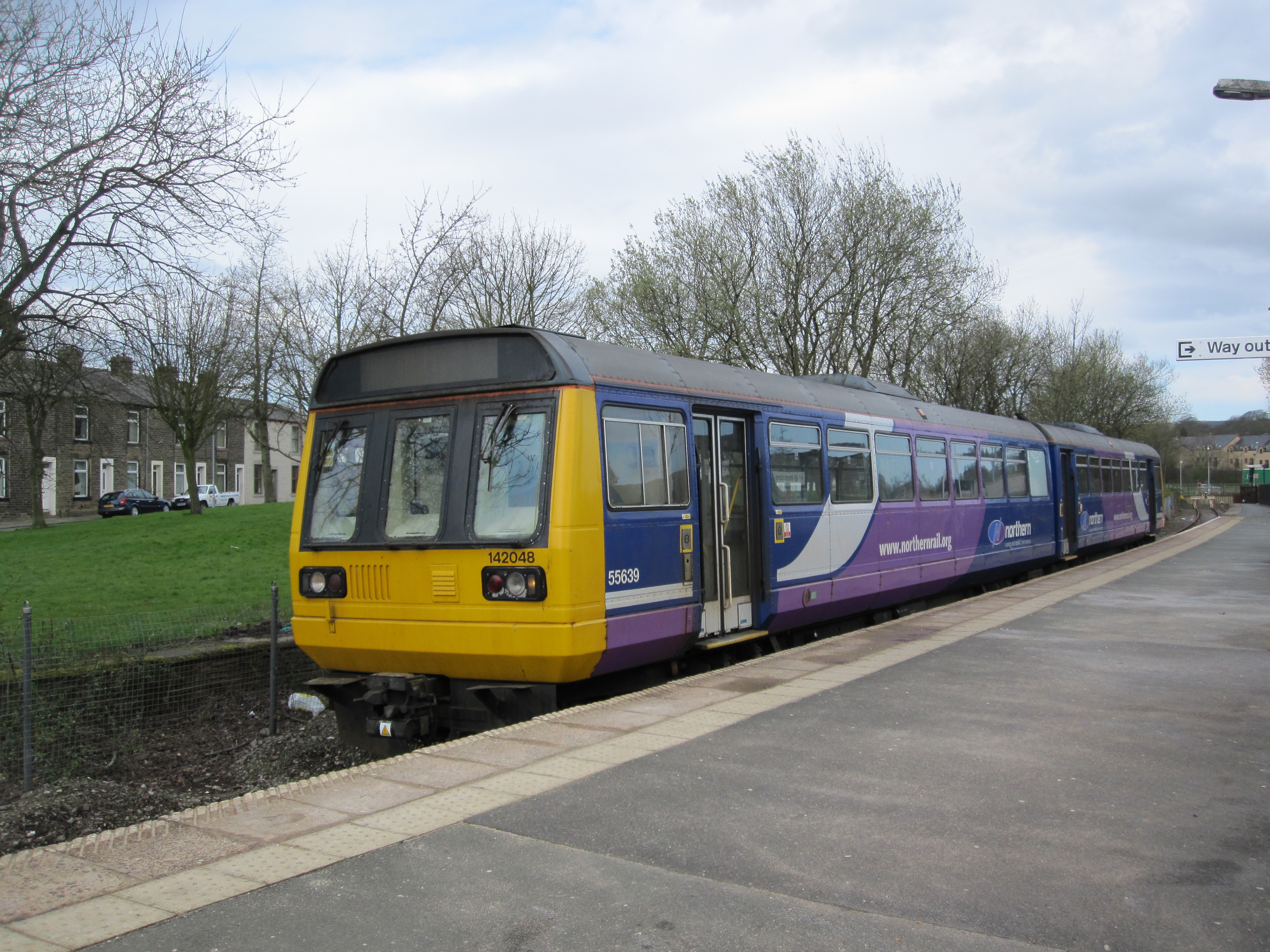
- A Northern Rail Class 142 at Colne

Overview
- Owner: Network Rail
- Locale: Lancashire
- Termini: Preston; Colne
- Stations: 18

Service
- System: National Rail
- Operator: Northern Trains
- Rolling stock: Class 150; Class 156; Class 195

History
- Opened: 1849

Technical
- Number of tracks: Mainly double track; singled from Burnley Barracks to Colne
- Track gauge: 1,435 mm (4 ft 8 1/2 in) standard gauge
Route map
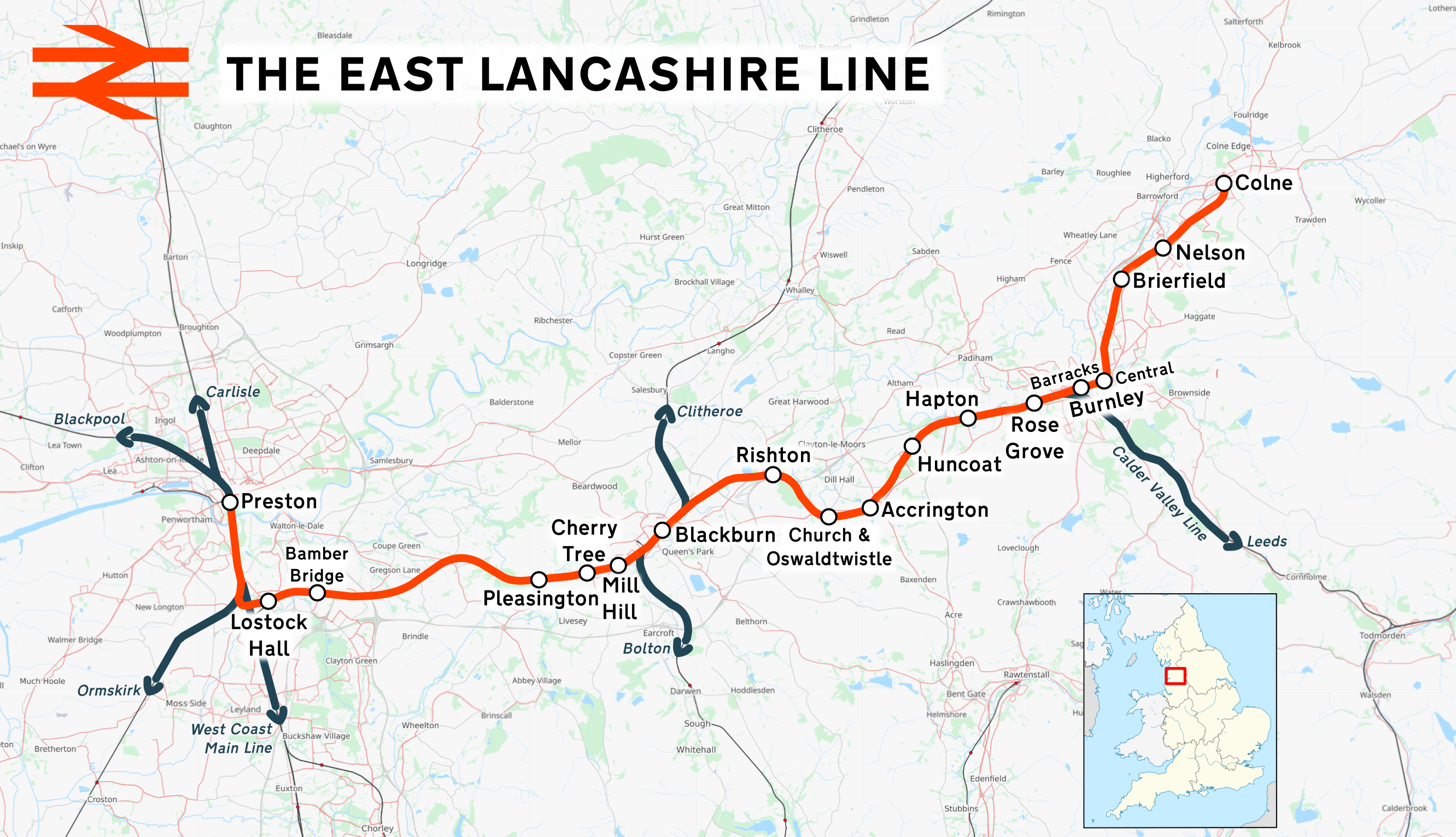
(Click to expand)

The East Lancashire line is a railway route in Lancashire, England. It connects Preston and Colne, via Blackburn, Accrington, Burnley Central and Nelson. The line formerly ran on to Skipton, but this section was closed in 1970. It is operated by Northern Trains.

== History ==
The line was built by the Blackburn and Preston Railway and the Blackburn, Burnley, Accrington and Colne Extension Railway. Both companies were later absorbed by the East Lancashire Railway on 3 August 1846 and 21 July 1845 respectively. The East Lancashire Railway was, in turn, absorbed by the Lancashire and Yorkshire Railway on 13 May 1859.

The line connected end-on at Colne with the Leeds and Bradford Extension Railway's line to Skipton and Bradford; this 11 1/2-mile (18.5 km) link closed in 1970. The Skipton–East Lancashire Rail Action Partnership (SELRAP) now campaigns to reinstate it. The section from Colne to Nelson was singled in the following year, with the rest of the line to Gannow Junction being so treated in December 1986.

In the 1870s, the Lancashire and Yorkshire Railway built the North Lancashire Loop (also known as the Great Harwood Loop), a 9-mile (14 km) route through Great Harwood, Simonstone and Padiham, which bypassed Accrington. The line between Padiham and Rose Grove opened in 1875; west of Padiham, it opened two years later as a result of difficulties in constructing the embankments between Great Harwood and Simonstone.

Regular use of the North Lancashire Loop ceased in 1957; the route closed completely in 1964, with only the section from Rose Grove to Padiham Power Station remaining until 1993.

== Services ==
Trains from Preston to Colne usually begin at Blackpool South, on the Blackpool branch line, which makes the whole length of the route a total of 50 miles (80 km).

Services via the Roses line route encompass the Calder Valley line's semi-fast trains from Blackpool North, stopping at Preston, Blackburn, Accrington and Burnley Manchester Road; they head into Yorkshire, currently terminating at York. Since May 2015, trains between Blackburn, Todmorden and Manchester Victoria also use this route, providing a direct link from Accrington and Burnley to Manchester, via Rochdale.

Services on this line stop at every station, although Pleasington, Hapton and Burnley Barracks were request stopsuntil December 2025 when they became standard stops again. It was designated by the Department for Transport as a community rail line in November 2006.
