= Colne railway station =

Railway station in Lancashire, England

Colne
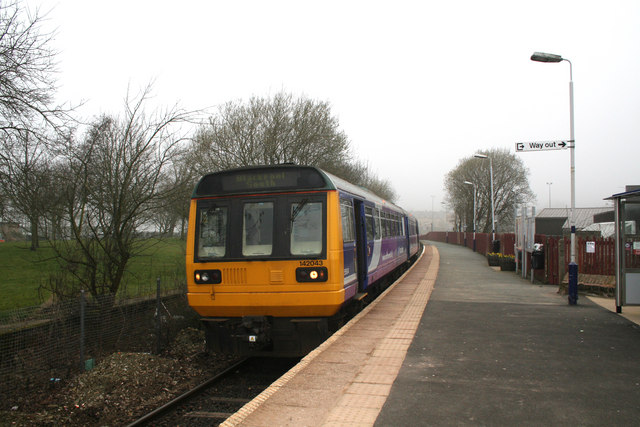
- A Northern Rail Class 142 at Colne railway station in 2009

General information
- Location: Colne, Pendle; England
- Coordinates: 53.8553°N 2.1822°W
- Grid reference: SD881398
- Managed by: Northern Trains
- Platforms: 1

Other information
- Station code: CNE
- Classification: DfT category F1

History
- Opened: 2 October 1848; 177 years ago

Passengers
- 2020/21: ▼21,090
- 2021/22: ▲68,804
- 2022/23: ▼66,808
- 2023/24: ▲71,486
- 2024/25: ▲82,154
Location
Notes
- Passenger statistics from the Office of Rail and Road

Colne railway station serves the town of Colne, in Lancashire, England, which is situated close to Pendle Hill. The station, which is managed by Northern Trains, is the eastern terminus of the East Lancashire Line. Trains from Blackpool South run through Preston and Blackburn to Burnley and Colne.

Currently the station only has a single platform and a shelter. The old station was demolished in 1971, after the closure of the line from Colne to Skipton, which had occurred in the previous year.

== History ==
The station opened on 2 October 1848, as the terminus of the Leeds and Bradford Extension Railway from Bradford and Skipton. The station became an end-on junction with the East Lancashire Railway's Blackburn, Burnley, Accrington and Colne Extension Railway, which opened on 1 February 1849. By 2 April in the same year the line was part of a through route between Leeds and Liverpool, but the majority of passenger trains east of Colne were local between Skipton and Colne.

The station was rebuilt in 1883 with two engine sheds - one for the Midland Railway to the east, one for the Lancashire and Yorkshire Railway to the west (these two companies now owning the respective lines). In its heyday, the station had regular through links to both Blackpool termini, Fleetwood, Leeds, Liverpool Exchange, Manchester Victoria via Bury Bolton Street and even through coaches to London Euston via Bolton, Manchester Victoria and Stockport. There were also summer dated services to/from Saltburn (worked in conjunction with the London & North Eastern Railway prior to nationalisation of the railways in 1948) and Llandudno. However, these had all disappeared by the mid-1960s as a result of economies imposed by the British Railways Board, leaving only basic local services to/from Preston, Manchester Victoria (via Blackburn) and Skipton.

The Beeching cuts of 1964/5 reduced the services along the Skipton–Colne line, and on 2 February 1970 this section closed to all traffic. A year later the station was downgraded to an unstaffed halt following the dismantling of the route towards Earby, the singling of the surviving line from Nelson and the abandonment of the eastbound island platform - all trains henceforth used the former westbound platform, which had its buildings demolished & replaced by a simple waiting shelter. The remainder of the branch from Gannow Junction (near Rose Grove) to Nelson was also reduced to single track in December 1986 and so the entire line from there is now operated as a 6 1/2 miles (10.5 km) "long siding" with no intermediate passing loops (this restricts the service frequency that can operate along the branch, as only one train can be on the branch at a time).

Colne is therefore in the unusual position of having been a western terminus (1848-1849), a through station (1849-1970) and an eastern terminus (1970 to present). The Skipton - East Lancashire Rail Action Partnership campaigns to reinstate the Skipton–Colne line.

== Facilities ==
Though unstaffed, the station has a ticket machine in place to allow travellers to buy or collect tickets prior to travelling. Passenger information screens and a PA system have also been installed to provide train running information for users. A ramp provides step-free access from the station car park and main road to the platform.

== Services ==
The station has an hourly service six days a week to Preston via Burnley Central serving all local stations en route. On Sundays only, trains continue through to Blackpool South - these used to run hourly, but since the winter 2022 timetable change have reverted to every two hours.

Preceding station	National Rail	Following station
Nelson	Northern Trains East Lancashire Line	Terminus
Historical railways
Bott Lane Halt Line open, station closed	Lancashire and Yorkshire Railway East Lancashire Railway	Terminus
Disused railways
Terminus	Midland Railway Leeds and Bradford Extension Railway	Foulridge Line and station closed

== Bibliography ==
- Binns, D. (1984), Steam in Airedale, Wyvern Publications, Skipton, ISBN 0-907941-11-7
- Frater, A. (1983) Stopping Train Britain - A Railway Odyssey, Hodder & Staughton Ltd, London. ISBN 0-340-32451-1
- Rush, R.W., (1983), The East Lancashire Railway, The Oakwood Press, ISBN 0-85361-295-1
- Suggitt, G. (2004 reprint), Lost Railways of Lancashire, Countryside Books, Newbury, ISBN 1-85306-801-2
- Taylor, S., (1994), The Railways of Colne, Lancashire, Scenes from the Past No. 23, Foxline Publishing, ISBN 1-870119-35-5
