= List of closed railway stations in Lancashire =

This is a list of closed railway stations in Lancashire, a ceremonial county in North West England. It excludes stations that were in the historic county of Lancashire, but whose location is outside the modern-day county boundaries.

== List ==
Historic information							Current
Name at closure	Opened	Closed	Original company	Previous names	Owner in 1921	Platforms	Modern borough
Altcar and Hillhouse	1884	1952	SCLER		Cheshire Lines Committee	2	West Lancashire
Arkholme for Kirkby Lonsdale	1867	1960	Furness and Midland Joint Railway	Arkholme (1867–69)	Furness and Midland Joint Railway	2	Lancaster
Ashton Hall Halt (private)	1883	1930	LNWR	Ashton Hall	LNWR		Lancaster
Bacup	1852	1966	East Lancashire Railway	—	LYR	2	Rossendale
Banks	1878	1964	West Lancashire Railway		LYR	2	West Lancashire
Barnoldswick	1871	1965	Barnoldswick Railway	—	Midland Railway	1	Pendle
Barton and Broughton	1840	1939	Lancaster and Preston Junction Railway	Broughton [2] (1840–61)	LNWR	2	Preston
Baxenden	1848	1951	East Lancashire Railway	—	LYR		Hyndburn
Bay Horse	1840	1960	Lancaster and Preston Junction Railway	—	LNWR	2	Lancaster
Blackburn Bolton Road	1847	1859	BBC&WYR	—	—		Blackburn with Darwen
Blackpool Central	1863	1964	Blackpool and Lytham Railway	Blackpool Hounds' Hill (1872–78) • Blackpool (1863–72)	LYR and LNWR	14	Blackpool
Boat Yard Crossing Halt	1912	1913	LYR	—	—		West Lancashire
Bolton-le-Sands	1850	1969	Lancaster & Carlisle Railway	Bolton (1850–61)	LNWR		Lancaster
Borwick	1867	1960	Furness and Midland Joint Railway	—	Furness and Midland Joint Railway	2	Lancaster
Bott Lane Halt	1906	1956	LYR	—	LYR		Pendle
Brinscall	1869	1960	Lancashire Union Railway	—	LYR and LNWR		Chorley
Britannia	1881	1917	LYR	—	—	2	Rossendale
Brock	c. 1849	1939	Lancaster and Preston Junction Railway	—	LNWR	2	Wyre
Broughton [1]	1840	1840	Lancaster and Preston Junction Railway	—	—		Preston
Burn Naze Halt	1908	1970	LYR and LNWR	—	LYR and LNWR	2	Wyre
Carr Lane	1921	1930	Knott End Railway	—	Knott End Railway	1	Wyre
Caton	1849	1961	"Little" North Western Railway	—	Midland Railway		Lancaster
Chatburn	1850	1962	BBC&WYR	—	LYR	2	Ribble Valley
Claughton	1851	1853	"Little" North Western Railway	—	—		Lancaster
Clough Fold	1871	1966	East Lancashire Railway	—	LYR	2	Rossendale
Cocker Bar	c. 1850	1859	East Lancashire Railway	—	—		South Ribble
Cockerham Cross Halt	1870	1930	Garstang and Knot-End Railway	Cockerham Crossing (1870–c. 1900)	Knott End Railway	1	Wyre
Cogie Hill Halt	1870	1930	Garstang and Knot-End Railway	Cogie Hill Crossing (1870–c. 1890)	Knott End Railway	1	Wyre
Conder Green	1883	1930	LNWR	—	LNWR		Lancaster
Coppull	1838	1969	North Union Railway	—	LNWR		Chorley
Daisyfield	1852	1958	Blackburn Railway	—	LYR	2	Blackburn with Darwen
Deepdale	1856	1930	FP&WRJR	Deepdale Bridge (1856–67)	LYR and LNWR		Preston
Downholland	1887	1938	LS&PJR	Barton (1887–1924)	LYR	2	West Lancashire
Earby	1848	1970	Leeds and Bradford Extension Railway	—	Midland Railway	3	Pendle
Euxton (L&NW)	1838	1895	North Union Railway	—	—		Chorley
Euxton (L&Y)	1843	1917	Bolton and Preston Railway	—	—		Chorley
Ewood Bridge and Edenfield	1846	1972	East Lancashire Railway	"Ewood Bridge" in some timetables	LYR	2	Rossendale
Facit	1870	1947	LYR	—	LYR	1	Rossendale
Farington	1838	1960	North Union Railway	Farrington (1838–57)	LYR and LNWR	4	South Ribble
Feniscowles	1869	1960	Lancashire Union Railway	—	LYR and LNWR		Blackburn with Darwen
Fleetwood (1&2)	1840	1966	Preston and Wyre Joint Railway	—	LYR and LNWR	5	Wyre
Fleetwood (3)	1885	1970	LYR and LNWR	Wyre Dock (1885–1966)	LYR and LNWR	2	Wyre
Foulridge	1848	1959	Leeds and Bradford Extension Railway	—	Midland Railway	2	Pendle
Galgate	1840	1939	Lancaster and Preston Junction Railway	—	LNWR	2	Lancaster
Garstang and Catterall	1840	1969	Lancaster and Preston Junction Railway	—	LNWR	3	Wyre
Garstang Road Halt	1923	1930	London, Midland and Scottish Railway	—	—	1	Wyre
Garstang Town	1870	1930	Garstang and Knot-End Railway	Garstang (1870–1924)	Knott End Railway	1	Wyre
Gillett's Crossing	1913	1939	LYR and LNWR	—	LYR and LNWR	2	Fylde
Gisburn	1879	1962	LYR	—	LYR	2	Ribble Valley
Glasson Dock	1883	1930	LNWR	—	LNWR		Lancaster
Goosehouse	1847	1849	BBC&WYR	—	—		Blackburn with Darwen
Great Harwood	1877	1957	LYR	—	LYR	2	Hyndburn
Grimsargh	1840	1930	Preston and Longridge Railway	—	LYR and LNWR	1	Preston
Grimsargh (WHR)	1889	1957	Lancashire County Council	—	Lancashire County Council	1	Preston
Halsall	1887	1938	LS&PJR	—	LYR	2	West Lancashire
Halton (Lancs)	1849	1966	"Little" North Western Railway	—	Midland Railway	2	Lancaster
Haslingden	1848	1960	East Lancashire Railway	—	LYR	2	Rossendale
Heapey	1869	1960	Lancashire Union Railway	—	LYR and LNWR	2	Chorley
Heathey Lane Halt	1907	1938	LS&PJR	—	LYR		West Lancashire
Helmshore	1848	1966	East Lancashire Railway	—	LYR	2	Rossendale
Hesketh Bank	1878	1964	West Lancashire Railway	"Hesketh Bank for Tarleton" in some timetables	LYR		West Lancashire
Hest Bank	1846	1969	Lancaster & Carlisle Railway	—	LNWR	3	Lancaster
Hoghton Tower	1846	1848	Blackburn and Preston Railway	—	—		Chorley
Hoghton	1846	1960	Blackburn and Preston Railway	—	LYR		Chorley
Holme	1849	1930	Manchester and Leeds Railway	—	LYR		Burnley
Hoole	1882	1964	West Lancashire Railway	—	LYR		South Ribble
Hornby	1849	1957	"Little" North Western Railway	Hornby for Kirkby Lonsdale (1851–63)	Midland Railway		Lancaster
Hundred End	1878	1962	West Lancashire Railway	"Hundred End for Mere Brow and Holms" in some timetables	LYR		West Lancashire
Kirkby Lonsdale	1861	1954	Lancaster & Carlisle Railway	—	LNWR	2	Lancaster
Knott End	1908	1930	Knott End Railway	—	Knott End Railway	1	Wyre
Lancaster Green Ayre	1848	1966	Morecambe Harbour and Railway	Lancaster (1848–50) • Lancaster Green Area (1850–70)	Midland Railway		Lancaster
Lancaster	1840	1849	Lancaster and Preston Junction Railway	—	—		Lancaster
Lea Road	1842	1938	Preston and Wyre Joint Railway	—	LYR and LNWR	2	Preston
Longridge	1840	1930	Preston and Longridge Railway	—	LYR and LNWR	1	Ribble Valley
Longton Bridge	1882	1964	West Lancashire Railway	Longton (1882–92)	LYR		South Ribble
Lower Darwen	1847	1958	BBC&WYR	—	LYR		Blackburn with Darwen
Lydiate	1884	1952	SCLER	—	Cheshire Lines Committee		West Lancashire
Lytham (Station Road)	1846	1874	Preston and Wyre Joint Railway	—	—	2	Fylde
Lytham Junction	1846	1853	Preston and Wyre Joint Railway	—	—		Fylde
Melling	1867	1952	Furness and Midland Joint Railway	—	Furness and Midland Joint Railway		Lancaster
Middleton Road Bridge Halt	1904	1905	Midland Railway	—	—		Lancaster
Midge Hall	1859	1961	LYR	—	LYR	2	South Ribble
Morecambe (Midland)	1907	1994	Midland Railway	Morecambe Promenade (1924–68)	Midland Railway	4	Lancaster
Morecambe (Northumberland Street)	1848	1907	Morecambe Harbour and Railway	Poulton-le-Sands (NWR) (1848–50)	—		Lancaster
Morecambe Euston Road	1886	1958	LNWR	Morecambe (LNWR) (1886–1924)	LNWR	5	Lancaster
Morecambe Harbour	1848	1904	Morecambe Harbour and Railway	Morecambe Pier (1848–54)	—		Lancaster
Morecambe Poulton Lane	1864	1886	LNWR	—	—		Lancaster
Mossbridge	1886	1917	SCLER	Barton and Halsall (1886–94)	—		West Lancashire
Nateby	1870	1930	Garstang and Knot-End Railway	Winmarleigh (1870–1902)	Knott End Railway	1	Wyre
New Cut Lane Halt	1906	1938	LS&PJR	—	LYR		West Lancashire
New Hall Bridge Halt	1906	1948	East Lancashire Railway	—	LYR		Burnley
New Longton and Hutton	1889	1964	West Lancashire Railway	Hutton and Howick (1897–1934) • Howick (1889–97)	LYR		South Ribble
Newsholme	1880	1957	LYR	—	LYR	2	Ribble Valley
Oxheys	1869	1925	LNWR	Also known as "Oxheys Cattle"	LNWR	1	Preston
Padiham	1877	1957	LYR	—	LYR	2	Burnley
Penwortham (Cop Lane)	1911	1964	LYR	Cop Lane Halt (1911–40)	LYR		South Ribble
Pilling	1870	1930	Garstang and Knot-End Railway	—	Knott End Railway	1	Wyre
Plex Moss Lane Halt	1906	1938	LYR	—	LYR		West Lancashire
Poulton Curve Halt	1908	1952	LYR and LNWR	—	LYR and LNWR	2	Wyre
Preesall	1908	1930	Knott End Railway	—	Knott End Railway	1	Wyre
Preston Deepdale Street	1840	1856	Preston and Longridge Railway	—	—		Preston
Preston Dock Street Junction	1840	1844	Lancaster and Preston Junction Railway	—	—	0	Preston
Preston Fishergate Hill	1882	1900	West Lancashire Railway	Also known as "Preston (West Lancashire)"	—		Preston
Preston Maudlands Bridge	1856	1885	FP&WRJR	—	—	1	Preston
Preston Maudlands	1840	1844	Preston and Wyre Joint Railway	—	—	2	Preston
Preston Maxwell House	1842	1844	Lancaster and Preston Junction Railway	—	—	1	Preston
Rawlinson Bridge	1841	1841	Bolton and Preston Railway	—	—		Chorley
Reedley Hallows Halt	1906	1956	LYR	—	LYR		Burnley
Ribbleton (1)	1863	1866	FP&WRJR	—	—	1	Preston
Ribbleton (2)	1854	1930	Preston and Longridge Railway	Gammer Lane (1854–56) • Fulwood (1856–1900)	LYR and LNWR	1	Preston
Rimington	1880	1958	LYR	—	LYR	2	Ribble Valley
River Douglas	1882	1887	West Lancashire Railway	—	—	2	West Lancashire
Roebuck	1840	1849	Lancaster and Preston Junction Railway	—	—		Wyre
Scale Hall	1957	1966	British Rail	—	—		Lancaster
Scorton	1840	1939	Lancaster and Preston Junction Railway	—	LNWR		Wyre
Shawforth	1881	1947	LYR	—	LYR	1	Rossendale
Shirdley Hill	1887	1938	LS&PJR	—	LYR	2	West Lancashire
Simonstone	1877	1957	LYR	—	LYR	2	Ribble Valley
Singleton	1870	1932	Preston and Wyre Joint Railway	—	LYR and LNWR	2	Fylde
Skelmersdale	1858	1956	East Lancashire Railway	Blaguegate (1858–74)	LYR	2	West Lancashire
South Shore Lytham Road	1863	1916	Blackpool and Lytham Railway	South Shore (1863–1903)	—	2	Blackpool
Spring Vale	1847	1958	BBC&WYR	Sough (1847–70) • Spring Vale and Sough (1870–77)	LYR	2	Blackburn with Darwen
Stacksteads	1852	1966	East Lancashire Railway	—	LYR	2	Rossendale
Stubbins	1847	1972	East Lancashire Railway	—	LYR	2	Rossendale
Tarleton Halt	1912	1913	LYR	—	—		West Lancashire
Thornton–Cleveleys	1865	1970	Preston and Wyre Joint Railway	Thornton for Cleveleys (1905–53) • Cleveleys (1865–1905)	LYR and LNWR	2	Wyre
Todd Lane Junction	1852	1968	East Lancashire Railway	Preston Junction (1852–1952)	LYR		South Ribble
Towneley	1849	1952	Manchester and Leeds Railway	—	LYR		Burnley
Turton and Edgworth	1848	1961	BBC&WYR	Turton (1877–91) • Chapel Town (1848–77)	LYR	2	Blackburn with Darwen
Waterfoot	1848	1966	East Lancashire Railway	Waterfoot for Newchurch (1881–1922) • Newchurch (1848–81)	LYR	2	Rossendale
Westhead Halt	1906	1951	LYR	—	LYR		West Lancashire
White Bear	1869	1960	Lancashire Union Railway	"White Bear (Adlington)" or "White Bear for Adlington" in some timetables	LYR and LNWR	2	Chorley
Whittingham Hospital	1889	1957	Lancashire County Council	—	Lancashire County Council	1	Preston
Whitworth	1870	1947	LYR	—	LYR	1	Rossendale
Wilpshire	1850	1962	BBC&WYR	Ribchester (1850–74) • "Wilpshire for Ribchester" in some timetables	LYR		Blackburn with Darwen
Withnell	1869	1960	Lancashire Union Railway	—	LYR and LNWR		Chorley
Wray	1849	1850	"Little" North Western Railway	—	—		Lancaster
Wrea Green	1846	1961	Preston and Wyre Joint Railway	Wray Green (1846–75)	LYR and LNWR	2	Fylde

== See also ==
- For other closed stations within the historic county boundaries of Lancashire (pre-1974) see:
  - List of closed railway stations in Greater Manchester
  - List of closed railway stations in Merseyside
- For open stations see:
  - List of railway stations in Lancashire
  - List of railway stations in Greater Manchester
  - List of railway stations in Merseyside
