= Myerscough =

Myerscough may refer to:

- Myerscough, Lancashire, a hamlet and former civil parish in the English county of Lancashire
  - Myerscough and Bilsborrow, the larger civil parish in which Myerscough is now situated
  - Myerscough College, a Higher and Further Education college in Myerscough
- Myerscough (surname), an English surname which originated in the hamlet.
