= Pilling railway station =

Former railway station in England

Pilling
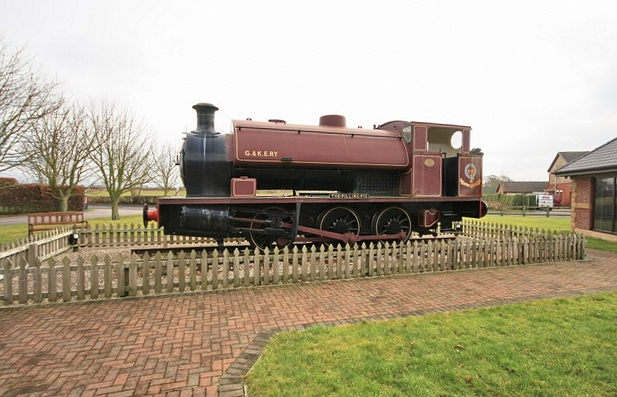

General information
- Location: Borough of Wyre; England
- Coordinates: 53.9224°N 2.8946°W
- Grid reference: SD413477
- Platforms: 2

Other information
- Status: Disused

History
- Original company: Garstang and Knot-End Railway
- Pre-grouping: Knott End Railway
- Post-grouping: London, Midland and Scottish Railway

Key dates
- 5 December 1870: Opened
- 11 March 1872: Closed
- 17 May 1875: Reopened
- 31 March 1930: Closed
Location

Pilling railway station served the villages of Pilling and Stake Pool in Lancashire, England.

== Under the Garstang and Knot-End Railway ==
The station opened on 5 December 1870 as the terminus of the Garstang and Knot-End Railway when it opened the 7 miles 1 chain (11.3 km) long line from Garstang. (Note: Railways in the United Kingdom are, for historical reasons, measured in miles and chains. A chain is 22 yards (20 m) long, there are 80 chains to the mile.)

The station was located on the southern edge of Stake Pool village to the east of the road running south (now Bradshaw Lane), and was sometimes called Stake Pool station by the local press. (Note: See for example "District News:Garstang". Preston Chronicle. 2 October 1875. p. 3 – via British Newspaper Archive.) Although called Pilling station, it was about 1,500 yards (1,400 m) from Pilling village across country, or about 1.5 miles (2.4 km) by road.

The line was a single track, and a passing loop, which appeared to cross the adjacent road on the level, was provided at the station to enable the locomotive to run round the train. At this time there was one platform to the south of the running line and a small building between the platform and the road. A small goods yard was to the south and east of the station. Able to accommodate most types of goods including live stock, it was equipped with a half-ton crane. The initial service was for four trains in each direction.

== Under the Knott End Railway ==
The railway company was bought out by the Knott End Railway and the line was extended to Knott End on 30 July 1908, at which time a second platform was built, so that the platforms were either side of the passing loop, the goods yard was extended and a goods shed provided. A substantially larger station building was constructed immediately south of the southern platform.

In 1922, the service had increased to six trains each way, with an extra train on Fridays to and from Knott End. There were no services on Sundays.

== LMS and closure ==
The station closed to passengers on 31 March 1930. Despite being closed, the station was still available for goods and parcels, by 1938 the crane had been upgraded to 1 ton capacity. The line and station closed for freight on 31 July 1963. In 1981, it was reported that the station goods yard was now a small industrial estate and the former station house had become a private dwelling. (Note: Online mapping with street view shows the same situation in 2020)

Preceding station	Disused railways	Following station
Cockerham Cross Halt	Garstang and Knot-End Railway; 1870 – 1908	Terminus
Cockerham Cross Halt	Knott End Railway; Garstang and Knot-End Railway; 1908 – 1921; Amalgamated	Preesall
Cockerham Cross Halt	Knott End Railway; Garstang and Knot-End Railway; 1921 – 1923	Carr Lane; New station
Garstang Road Halt; New station	London, Midland and Scottish Railway; Knott End Railway; 1923 – 1930; Grouping	Carr Lane
