= Listed buildings in Myerscough and Bilsborrow =

Myerscough and Bilsborrow is a civil parish in the Wyre district of Lancashire, England. It contains 15 listed buildings that are recorded in the National Heritage List for England. All the listed buildings are designated at Grade II, the lowest of the three grades, which is applied to "buildings of national importance and special interest". The parish contains the village of Bilsborrow, the hamlet of Myerscough, and the surrounding countryside. The Lancaster Canal and the River Brock pass through the parish. Five bridges over the canal and two over the river are listed, together with the aqueduct carrying the canal over the river. The other listed buildings include farmhouses and a farm building, entrance piers and walls, a milestone, a boundary stone, and a country house.

== Buildings ==
Name and location	Photograph	Date	Notes
Brock Side Farmhouse; 53.86393°N 2.72543°W	—	1733	A sandstone house with a slate roof, in two storeys and three bays. The windows are cross windows, and the doorway has a quoined surround. Above the doorway is an inscribed plaque.
Entrance piers and walls, Myerscough Hall; 53.85466°N 2.74514°W	—	Mid 18th century	The piers and walls are at the entrance to the drive of Myerscough Hall and are in sandstone. The inner piers flank the drive, they are square and rusticated and have dentilled cornices. Each pier has an Ionic pilaster on the west side. Curved walls link these to the smaller outer piers, which are also square and rusticated, and have pyramidal caps.
Milestone; 53.85251°N 2.74519°W	—	Late 18th century	The milestone is in sandstone and has a half-oval plan. It carries two cast iron plates, one indicating the distance in miles to Garstang, and the other to Preston.
Hankinson Bridge; 53.82554°N 2.75014°W		1797	This is bridge No. 40, an accommodation bridge over the Lancaster Canal. It is in sandstone and consists of a single elliptical arch. The bridge has a stepped keystone below a solid parapet with a rounded top.
Park Head Bridge; 53.82817°N 2.75119°W		1797	This is bridge No. 41, an accommodation bridge over the Lancaster Canal. It is in sandstone and consists of a single elliptical arch. The bridge has a stepped keystone below a solid parapet with a rounded top.
White Horse Bridge; 53.83753°N 2.74948°W		1797	This is bridge No. 42 over the Lancaster Canal, and carries White Horse Lane over the canal. It is in sandstone and consists of a single elliptical arch. The bridge has a stepped keystone below a solid parapet with a rounded top.
Head Nook Bridge; 53.84522°N 2.75608°W		1797	This is bridge No. 43, an accommodation bridge over the Lancaster Canal. It is in sandstone and consists of a single elliptical arch. The bridge has a stepped keystone below a solid parapet with a rounded top.
Canal bridge No. 45; 53.85463°N 2.74590°W		1797	This is bridge No. 45 over the Lancaster Canal, and carries Myerscough Hall Drive over the canal. It is in sandstone and consists of a single elliptical arch. The bridge has a stepped keystone below a solid parapet with a rounded top.
Brock Aqueduct; 53.85773°N 2.75219°W		1797	This is bridge No. 46, and carries the Lancaster Canal over the River Brock. It is in sandstone and consists of a single low elliptical arch. The walls are concave on plan, and the aqueduct has a moulded cornice under a solid parapet.
Lady Whitehead Farmhouse and barn 53.85198°N 2.72307°W	—	Early 19th century	The farmhouse and barn are in sandstone with slate roofs. The house has two storeys and two bays. The windows have plain surrounds; those in the left bay are sashes. The doorway also has a plain surround and a canopy of two pitched stone slates. The barn to the right has a wide entrance with a segmental arch, a doorway and a window. (Note: Street View in March 2009 shows that the barn has been converted into domestic accommodation.)
Methodist Chapel; 53.85240°N 2.73620°W		Early 19th century	The Methodist chapel is pebbledashed with a slate roof, and has a single storey and an octagonal plan. Its windows are modern with rendered reveals, and the door has a plain surround. There is a single-storey extension to the west and a lean-to addition to the north.
New Bridge; 53.86292°N 2.72722°W		Early 19th century	The bridge carries Lydiate Lane over the River Brock. It is in sandstone and consists of a single elliptical arch. The bridge has voussoirs and a band below a solid parapet.
Walmsley Bridge; 53.86761°N 2.71024°W		Early 19th century (probable)	The bridge carries Walmsley Bridge Lane over the River Brock. It is in sandstone and consists of a single elliptical arch. The bridge has voussoirs with alternate rustication, a band, and a solid parapet with coping. The western parapet has two dated inscriptions.
Boundary stone 53.85838°N 2.70992°W	—	19th century	The boundary stone has a triangular section and a sloping top, and marked the boundaries of the Preston Rural District and the Garstang Rural District. There are inscriptions on the top and the sides.
Bilsborough Hall; 53.85501°N 2.72613°W	—	1913	A country house that was extended in 1924–27. It is in sandstone with stone-slate roofs, in the style of the late 17th century, and has an irregular plan. Its features include gables, bay windows, and windows that are mullioned or mullioned and transomed. Inside the house are furniture and fittings in 17th-century style, including an inglenook.

== Notes and references ==
=== Sources ===
- Hartwell, Clare; Pevsner, Nikolaus (2009) [1969], Lancashire: North, The Buildings of England, New Haven and London: Yale University Press, ISBN 978-0-300-12667-9
- Historic England, "Brock Side Farmhouse, Myerscough and Bilsborrow (1361937)", National Heritage List for England
- Historic England, "Two pairs of piers with linking walls at entrance to drive to Myerscough Hall, Myerscough and Bilsborrow (1163810)", National Heritage List for England
- Historic England, "Milestone, Myerscough and Bilsborrow (1361960)", National Heritage List for England
- Historic England, "Hankinson Bridge (No.40), Myerscough and Bilsborrow (1072882)", National Heritage List for England
- Historic England, "Park Head Bridge (No.41), Myerscough and Bilsborrow (1072883)", National Heritage List for England
- Historic England, "White Horse Bridge (No.42), Myerscough and Bilsborrow (1163825)", National Heritage List for England
- Historic England, "Head Nook Bridge (No.43), Myerscough and Bilsborrow (1163805)", National Heritage List for England
- Historic England, "Canal Bridge (No.45), Myerscough and Bilsborrow (1163796)", National Heritage List for England
- Historic England, "Brock Aqueduct (No.46), Myerscough and Bilsborrow (1361959)", National Heritage List for England
- Historic England, "Lady Whitehead Farmhouse and barn adjoining to west, Myerscough and Bilsborrow (1361939)", National Heritage List for England
- Historic England, "Methodist Chapel, Myerscough and Bilsborrow (1072912)", National Heritage List for England
- Historic England, "New Bridge, Myerscough and Bilsborrow (1072911)", National Heritage List for England
- Historic England, "Walmsley Bridge, Myerscough and Bilsborrow (1361938)", National Heritage List for England
- Historic England, "Boundary Stone, Myerscough and Bilsborrow (1391234)", National Heritage List for England
- Historic England, "Bilsborough Hall, Myerscough and Bilsborrow (1072910)", National Heritage List for England
- Historic England, Listed Buildings
