= Myerscough, Lancashire =

Coordinates: 53.851648°N 2.7762800°W

Myerscough
- Hamlet
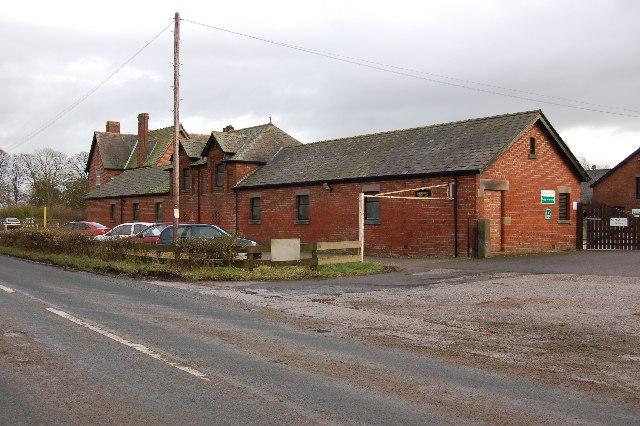
- Myerscough College Farm

- Shown within Wyre borough Location within Lancashire
- Population: 1,111 (2001 census)
- Civil parish: Myerscough and Bilsborrow
- District: Wyre
- Shire county: Lancashire
- Region: North West
- Country: England
- Sovereign state: United Kingdom
- Police: Lancashire
- Fire: Lancashire
- Ambulance: North West

Myerscough (/ˈmaɪərskə/) is a hamlet and former civil parish on the River Brock, 14 miles (23 km) from Lancaster, now in the parish of Myerscough and Bilsborrow, in the Wyre district, in the county of Lancashire, England. In 2001 it has a population of 1111. Since 1267 the Duchy of Lancaster has had land holdings in Myerscough.

== History ==
The name "Myerscough" means 'Bog wood', the "myrr" part is pre-7th-century-old Norse for "marsh" and the "skogr" part means a "copse" or "thicket". The surname derives from the hamlet. Myerscough was not recorded in the Domesday Book but the township may have been the lost village of Aschebi. Myerscough was recorded as Mirscho in 1258, Miresco in 1265 and Mirescowe in 1297. It was possibly part of the forest of Amounderness. Myerscough was a township in Lancaster parish. From 1866 Myerscough was a civil parish in its own right until it was merged with Bilsborrow on 1 April 2003 to form "Myerscough and Bilsborrow".

== Climate ==
Climate data for Myerscough (14m elevation) 1991–2020 normals, extremes 1987-
Month	Jan	Feb	Mar	Apr	May	Jun	Jul	Aug	Sep	Oct	Nov	Dec	Year
Record high °C (°F)	14.7 (58.5)	19.8 (67.6)	21.9 (71.4)	25.6 (78.1)	31.1 (88.0)	30.5 (86.9)	36.5 (97.7)	33.0 (91.4)	28.9 (84.0)	26.4 (79.5)	19.5 (67.1)	15.6 (60.1)	36.5 (97.7)
Mean daily maximum °C (°F)	7.7 (45.9)	8.4 (47.1)	10.6 (51.1)	13.7 (56.7)	16.8 (62.2)	19.2 (66.6)	20.8 (69.4)	20.4 (68.7)	18.1 (64.6)	14.5 (58.1)	10.7 (51.3)	8.1 (46.6)	14.1 (57.4)
Daily mean °C (°F)	4.7 (40.5)	5.2 (41.4)	6.8 (44.2)	9.1 (48.4)	12.0 (53.6)	14.7 (58.5)	16.5 (61.7)	16.2 (61.2)	14.0 (57.2)	10.9 (51.6)	7.5 (45.5)	5.0 (41.0)	10.2 (50.4)
Mean daily minimum °C (°F)	1.8 (35.2)	1.9 (35.4)	3.0 (37.4)	4.6 (40.3)	7.1 (44.8)	10.2 (50.4)	12.2 (54.0)	12.0 (53.6)	9.9 (49.8)	7.3 (45.1)	4.3 (39.7)	1.9 (35.4)	6.4 (43.5)
Record low °C (°F)	−10.5 (13.1)	−6.9 (19.6)	−8.5 (16.7)	−5.8 (21.6)	−2.0 (28.4)	0.0 (32.0)	5.2 (41.4)	2.0 (35.6)	−0.3 (31.5)	−4.0 (24.8)	−8.3 (17.1)	−13.7 (7.3)	−13.7 (7.3)
Average precipitation mm (inches)	94.7 (3.73)	80.8 (3.18)	67.9 (2.67)	56.9 (2.24)	60.9 (2.40)	72.4 (2.85)	82.4 (3.24)	99.5 (3.92)	96.9 (3.81)	116.2 (4.57)	108.7 (4.28)	120.9 (4.76)	1,058.1 (41.66)
Average precipitation days (≥ 1.0 mm)	15.6	12.3	11.7	10.1	10.0	10.8	12.4	13.7	12.7	15.4	16.7	16.4	157.9
Mean monthly sunshine hours	41.6	72.0	115.8	157.6	193.9	184.5	171.2	149.1	116.8	86.6	44.8	33.1	1,367.1
Source 1: Met Office
Source 2: Starlings Roost Weather
