= Brock railway station =

Disused railway station near Bilsborrow

Brock
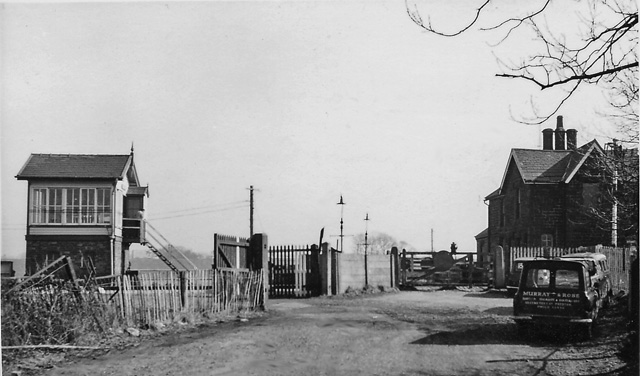
- The site of the station in 1970, with the former stationmaster's house on the right

General information
- Location: Myerscough and Bilsborrow, Borough of Wyre; England
- Coordinates: 53.8593°N 2.7434°W
- Grid reference: SD512406
- Platforms: 2

Other information
- Status: Disused

History
- Original company: Lancaster and Preston Junction Railway
- Pre-grouping: London and North Western Railway
- Post-grouping: London, Midland and Scottish Railway

Key dates
- August 1849: Opened
- 1 May 1939: Closed
Location
- Location within the Borough of Wyre Location within Lancashire

Brock railway station served the hamlet of Brock near Bilsborrow, Lancashire, England, from 1849 to 1939 on the Lancaster and Preston Junction Railway.

== History ==
The station opened in August 1849 by the Lancaster and Preston Junction Railway. It replaced Roebuck, which was to the south. To the west was a siding and underneath the platforms was the River Brock. The station closed on 1 May 1939.

Since 2012, the site of the demolished stationmaster's house and a terrace of four railway cottages has become a nature reserve protected by the Fields in Trust charity.

Preceding station	Historical railways	Following station
Garstang and Catterall; Line open, station closed	Lancaster and Preston Junction Railway	Barton and Broughton; Line open, station closed
