= Broughton railway station (England) =

Short-lived railway station in Broughton, Lancashire

Broughton

General information
- Location: Broughton, Lancashire; England
- Coordinates: 53.8110°N 2.7350°W
- Platforms: 2

Other information
- Status: Disused

History
- Original company: Lancaster and Preston Junction Railway
- Pre-grouping: Lancaster and Preston Junction Railway

Key dates
- 26 June 1840: Opened
- November 1840: Closed
Location
- Location within the City of Preston district Location within Lancashire

Broughton railway station served the village of Broughton, Lancashire, England, from June to November 1840 on the Lancaster and Preston Junction Railway.

== History ==
The station opened on 26 June 1840 by the Lancaster and Preston Junction Railway. It was very short-lived, only being open for 4–5 months, being replaced by Barton and Broughton in November 1840.

| Preceding station | Historical railways | Following station |
|---|---|---|
| Brock; Line open, station closed | Lancaster and Preston Junction Railway | Preston; Line and station open |
