= Roebuck railway station =

Disused railway station in Bilsborrow, Wyre

Coordinates: 53.8523°N 2.7410°W

Roebuck

General information
- Location: Bilsborrow, Borough of Wyre; England
- Platforms: 2

Other information
- Status: Disused

History
- Original company: Lancaster and Preston Junction Railway
- Pre-grouping: Lancaster and Preston Junction Railway

Key dates
- 26 June 1840: Opened
- August 1849: Closed
Location
- Location within the Borough of Wyre Location within Lancashire

Roebuck railway station served the village of Bilsborrow, Lancashire, England, from 1840 to 1849 on the Lancaster and Preston Junction Railway.

== History ==
The station opened on 26 June 1840 by the Lancaster and Preston Junction Railway. It was named after what is now the Roebuck Hotel. It was replaced by Brock, which opened to the north, in August 1849.

| Preceding station | Historical railways | Following station |
|---|---|---|
| Garstang and Catterall; Line open, station closed | Lancaster and Preston Junction Railway | Barton and Broughton; Line open, station closed |
