= Myerscough and Bilsborrow =

Coordinates: 53.85°N 2.75°W

- Civil parish
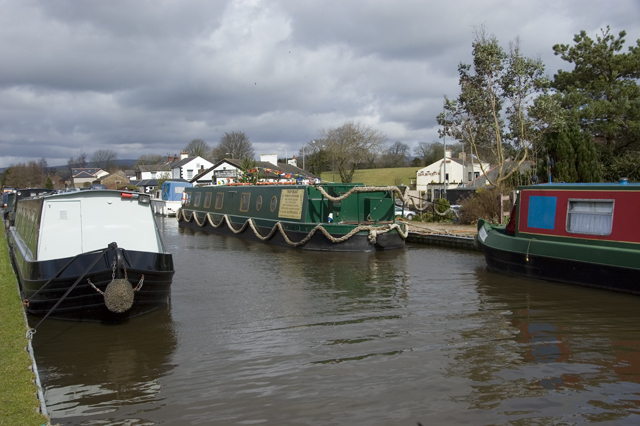
- The Lancaster Canal at Bilsborrow

- Shown within Wyre Borough Location within Lancashire
- Area: 14.4056 km^{2} (5.5620 sq mi)
- Population: 1,301 (2011)
  - Density: 90/km^{2} (230/sq mi)
- District: Wyre
- Shire county: Lancashire
- Region: North West
- Country: England
- Sovereign state: United Kingdom
- Post town: PRESTON
- Postcode district: PR3
- Dialling code: 01995
- Police: Lancashire
- Fire: Lancashire
- Ambulance: North West
- UK Parliament: Lancaster and Wyre

Myerscough and Bilsborrow (/ˈmaɪərskoʊ ... ˈbɪlzbʌrə/) is a civil parish in the Borough of Wyre in Lancashire, England. It was formed on 1 April 2003 as a merger of the former parishes of Bilsborrow and Myerscough, and lies on the eastern border of the Fylde plain. In 2011 the parish had a population of 1,301.

The largest settlement is the village of Bilsborrow. The hamlet of Brock is immediately to the north of Bilsborrow, and the hamlet of Myerscough lies about a mile (2 km) to the west of Bilsborrow. The River Brock flows east-to-west along the northern border of the former Bilsborrow parish and through the former Myerscough parish.

The Lancaster Canal, West Coast Main Line, A6 road and M6 motorway all pass north-to-south through the parish. There are canal moorings at Bilsborrow, and a marina at the Barton Grange Garden Centre to the north. When the Lancaster and Preston Junction Railway opened in 1840, it built Roebuck railway station next to the village, but in 1849 it was replaced by Brock railway station, half-a-mile (1 km) to the north, which survived until 1939.

In 1969, the Lancashire School of Agriculture moved onto the site of Myerscough Hall, which was renamed Myerscough College in 1993.

== See also ==
- Listed buildings in Myerscough and Bilsborrow
