= Maxwell House railway station =

Short-lived terminus in Preston, Lancashire

Maxwell House

General information
- Location: Preston, Lancashire; England
- Coordinates: 53.7580°N 2.7077°W
- Platforms: 1

Other information
- Status: Disused

History
- Original company: Lancaster and Preston Junction Railway

Key dates
- 1 January 1842: Opened
- 11 February 1844: Closed
Location
- Location within Preston city centre Location within Lancashire

Maxwell House railway station served Preston, Lancashire, England, from 1842 to 1844 on the Lancaster and Preston Junction Railway.

== History ==
The station owed its existence to rivalry between the first railway companies in Preston. The Bolton and Preston Railway (B&PR) intended to convert the Lancaster Canal Tramroad for its use, and in 1837 reserved a site at the north end of the tramroad for a station. This site, which was behind the Victoria Hotel in Fishergate and was then occupied by Maxwell House, was near the planned southern end of the Lancaster and Preston Junction Railway (L&PJR).

When the latter railway was completed, it initially had permission to use the North Union Railway's station (the present-day Preston railway station), but the two companies fell into disagreement and permission was revoked, to take effect from 1 January 1842. The L&PJR then approached the B&PR who agreed to complete construction of their station (as a small station with single platform) in time for the L&PJR to use it from 1 January.

The North Union Railway (NUR) responded by allowing L&PJR trains to use their station, but charged a toll of 6d per passenger (equivalent to £2.40 in 2025 (Note: UK Consumer Price Index inflation figures from 1209–2024 based on data from "Inflation calculator", Bank of England, London, 18 February 2026)) through the tunnel under Fishergate that connected their station with the station at Maxwell House. Most passengers avoided the toll by walking the 200 yards (200 m) between the two stations.

On 1 January 1844, the NUR bought the B&PR, thus gaining possession of the station at Maxwell House which the L&PJR was then banned from using. For several weeks L&PJR passengers alighted on the trackside at nearby Dock Street (off Pitt Street). The NUR and L&PJR came to agreement on 12 February 1844, and regular passenger trains used the NUR station from then onwards. The station at Maxwell House was used only for occasional excursion trains for several months afterwards.

Preceding station	Historical railways	Following station
Barton and Broughton; Line open, station closed	Lancaster and Preston Junction Railway	Preston; Line and station open
