= Broughton railway station =

Broughton railway station may refer to:

- Broughton railway station (England), in Broughton, Lancashire, closed in 1840
- Broughton railway station (Scotland), in Broughton, Scottish Borders, closed in the 1950s
- Broughton railway station (Wales), in Broughton, Flintshire, proposed since 2013

== See also ==
- Broughton Astley railway station
- Broughton & Bretton railway station
- Broughton Cross railway station
- Broughton Gifford Halt railway station
- Broughton Lane railway station
- Broughton Skeog railway station
- Broughton-in-Furness railway station
- Boughton railway station
