= Knott End-on-Sea =

Village in Lancashire, England

Coordinates: 53.926°N 2.979°W

Knott End-on-Sea: Knott End
- Village
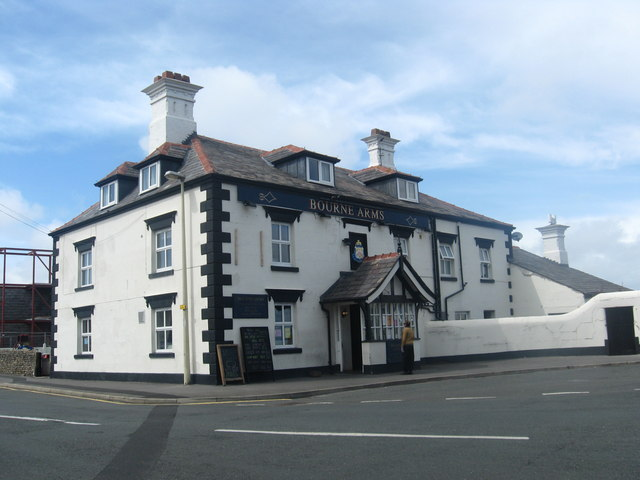
- The Bourne Arms public house

- Location in Wyre Borough Location on the Fylde Location on Morecambe Bay Location within Lancashire
- Population: 5,657
- OS grid reference: SD358483
- Civil parish: Preesall
- District: Wyre
- Shire county: Lancashire
- Region: North West
- Country: England
- Sovereign state: United Kingdom
- Post town: POULTON-LE-FYLDE
- Postcode district: FY6
- Dialling code: 01253
- Police: Lancashire
- Fire: Lancashire
- Ambulance: North West
- UK Parliament: Lancaster and Wyre

Knott End-on-Sea (known locally as Knott End) is a village in Lancashire, England, on the southern side of Morecambe Bay, across the Wyre estuary from Fleetwood. According to the 2021 census the population was 5,657.

== Amenities ==
Knott End has a pub―the Bourne Arms―a county library and a golf club.

== Public transport ==
Buses run regularly from Knott End and there is also a three-minute ferry crossing to Fleetwood.

Knott End is serviced by Blackpool Transport's route 5C, which loops between the village and Blackpool town centre via Poulton-le-Fylde. Archway Travel's number 567 runs between Knott End and schools in Lancaster, while the 541 passes through Pilling to Hodgson Academy and Baines High School in Poulton.

Stagecoach runs the route 88/89 services to Lancaster. The 88 goes via Garstang.

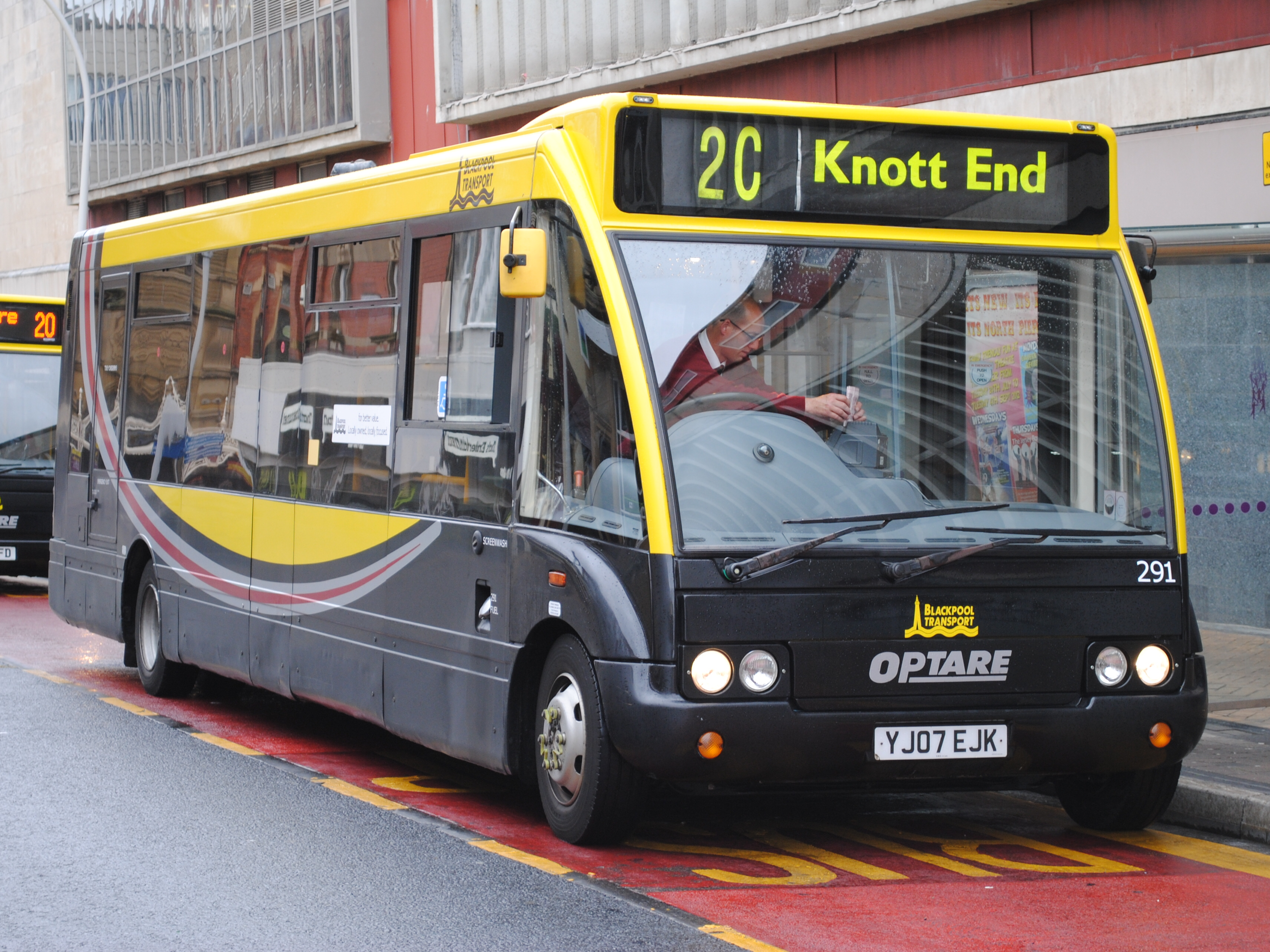
An Optare Solo M950 running the 2C route between Knott-End-on-Sea and Blackpool town centre in 2013

== See also ==
- Knott End Railway
- Knott End-on-Sea railway station
