= Garstang Town railway station =

Disused railway station in Garstang, Lancashire

Garstang Town
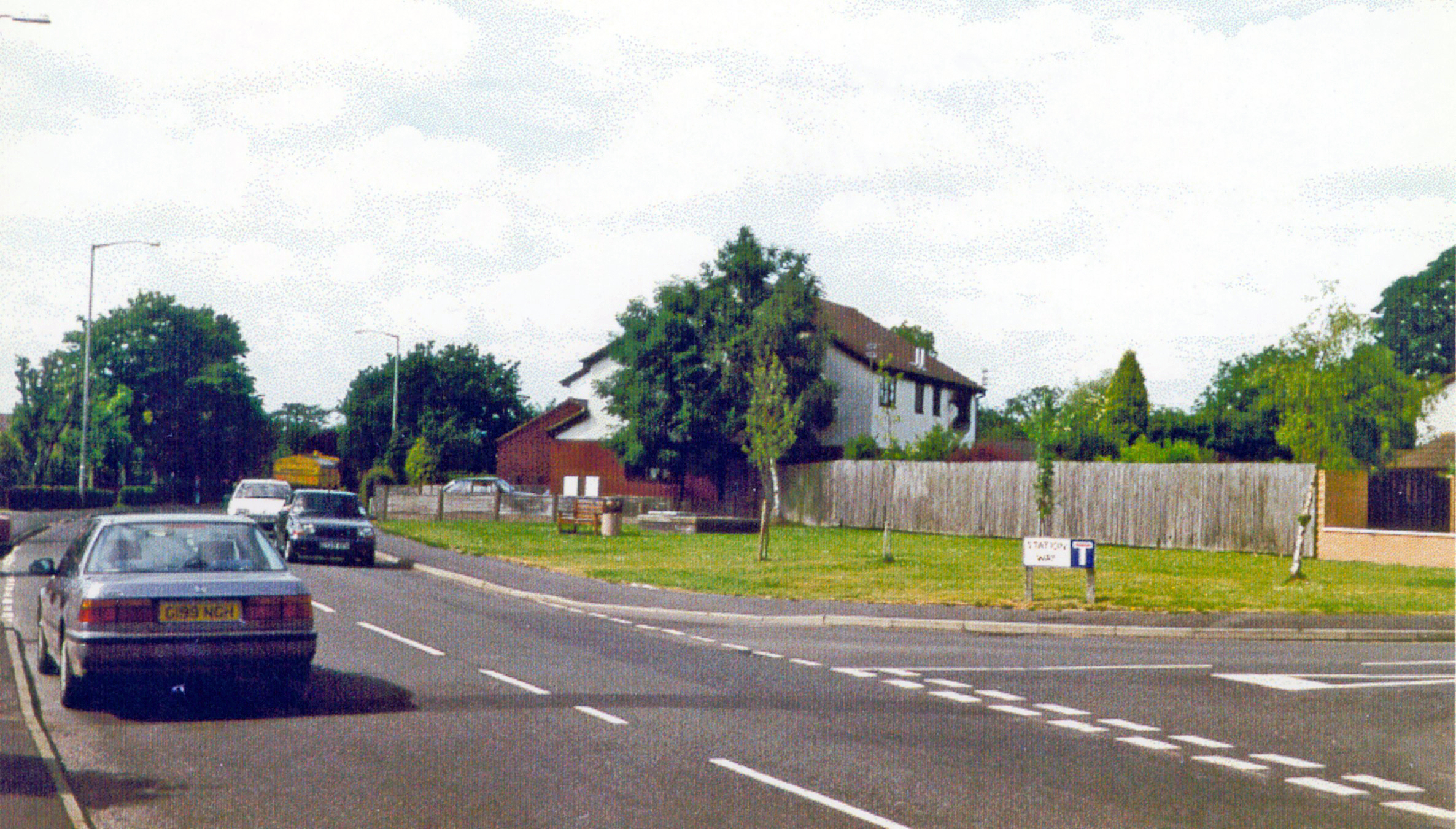
- The site of the former station (1996)

General information
- Location: Garstang; England
- Coordinates: 53.9038°N 2.7746°W
- Grid reference: SD492455
- Platforms: 1 (initially); 2 later added

Other information
- Status: Disused

History
- Original company: Garstang and Knot-End Railway
- Pre-grouping: Knott End Railway
- Post-grouping: London, Midland and Scottish Railway

Key dates
- 5 December 1870: Opened as Garstang
- 29 March 1872: Services ceased
- 17 May 1875: Services resumed
- 1909: Rebuilt
- 2 June 1924: Name changed to Garstang Town
- 31 March 1930: Closed to passengers
- 16 August 1965: Closed to goods
Location

Garstang Town railway station served the market town of Garstang in Lancashire, England. It opened in 1870. The station closed for passengers in 1930 and for freight in 1965.

== History ==
The station opened on 5 December 1870 by the Garstang and Knot-End Railway. It was situated on the west side of the B6430. To the south was a goods shed and an engine shed; to the north was a carriage shed. Like Cockerham Cross Halt and Cogie Hill, passenger services ceased on 11 March and 29 March 1872 due to a faulty locomotive, but they resumed when it was fitted with a new engine. The station was rebuilt in 1909 with two platforms: one on the left and an island platform, a station building on the island platform, a signal box to the west, a two-road engine shed to the northwest, and new carriage sheds to the northeast. 'Town' was added to its name on 2 July 1924. The station closed to passengers on 31 March 1930. It closed to goods on 16 August 1965. The site was later developed into housing.

Preceding station	Disused railways	Following station
Nateby	Garstang and Knot-End Railway	Garstang and Catterall
