= Wyre Estuary Ferry =

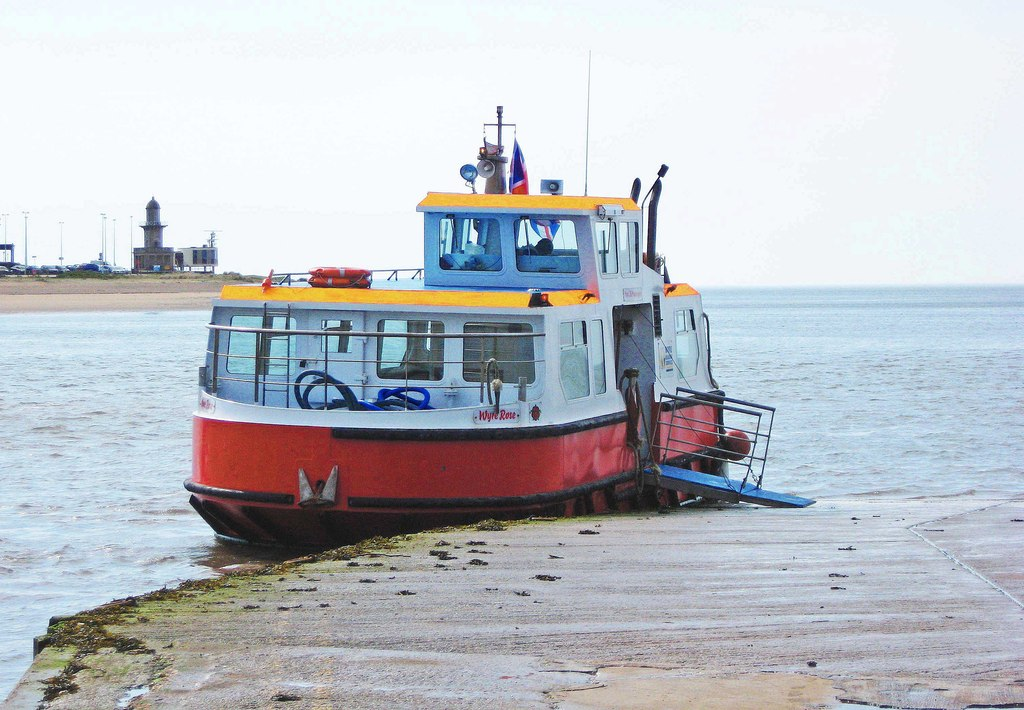
- The Wyre Rose at the Knott End jetty
- Locale: Fleetwood and Knott End, Lancashire, England
- Waterway: River Wyre
- Transit type: Passenger ferry
- Operator: Wyre Marine Services
- Began operation: 1841 (185 years ago)
- System length: 0.21 mi (0.3 km)
- No. of lines: 1
- No. of vessels: 1
- No. of terminals: 1 (Fleetwood Ferry Terminal)
- Yearly ridership: 30,000 (approx.)

The Wyre Estuary Ferry (colloquially known as the Fleetwood-to-Knott End Ferry) is a pedestrian ferry-crossing owned and operated by Wyre Marine Services in Fleetwood, Lancashire, England. The 0.21-mile (0.34 km) crossing of the River Wyre, which is funded by Lancashire County Council and Wyre Borough Council, takes around five minutes to complete. By road, the journey between the two points is 13 miles (21 km), which takes around thirty-five minutes.

The ferry operates daily between 7:45 AM and 5:45 PM, and can carry up to thirty-five passengers. No motorised vehicles are permitted. The current ferry is the 34-seat Wyre Rose.

== History ==
The crossing was established in 1841 by the Croft family, who operated it until 1893, when the Ferry Committee of the Improvement Act District of Fleetwood took it over. They leased the management of it to Newsham and Myerscroft. A steam service followed in 1894, with the Nelson.

The Croft family regained ownership in 1895, and remained in charge until 1898. During this period, a new landing stage was built at Knott End in 1897 to accommodate a new ferry, the Onward, which could carry 120 passengers.

The Crofts tendered to retain control of the service in 1898, but the council opted to run its own vessels. The Onward, Quail and Nymph were purchased from the family, members of which were appointed to various roles, from ferry manager to general assistants.

In 1901, the Bourne May was added to the ferry fleet, followed by the Wyresdale in 1925. The Wyresdale remained the primary ferry for the next thirty years or so, with the smaller Pilling providing assistance during off-peak times.

In 1905, around 10,000 passengers used the ferry in a single day, a record for the service.

The Lunevale was brought in during 1935, followed six years later by the Caldervale, which replaced the Pilling.

In 1966, the Viking 66 was brought into service, with the council chartering local vessels at times of its unavailability. The Wyre Lady, which had formerly serviced the River Clyde, assisted for a short time, before taking over on its own by around 1985.

The Wyre Lady was succeeded by the Wonder in 1995, then by the Wyre Princess and the Harvester.

The service was suspended between 2001 and 2003 and operated sporadically for much of the early part of the 21st century. It was reinstated on a full-time basis by Lancashire County Council in April 2006. They tendered the contract to Wyre Marine Services, at which point the service was renamed the "Wyre Estuary Ferry". The Wyre Rose is the current vessel used.

As of 2022, around 30,000 passengers use the ferry annually.

On 22 August 2025, the ferry was involved in the rescue of five sea cadets and two adults who had got into difficulties in an inflatable craft and were drifting out to sea.

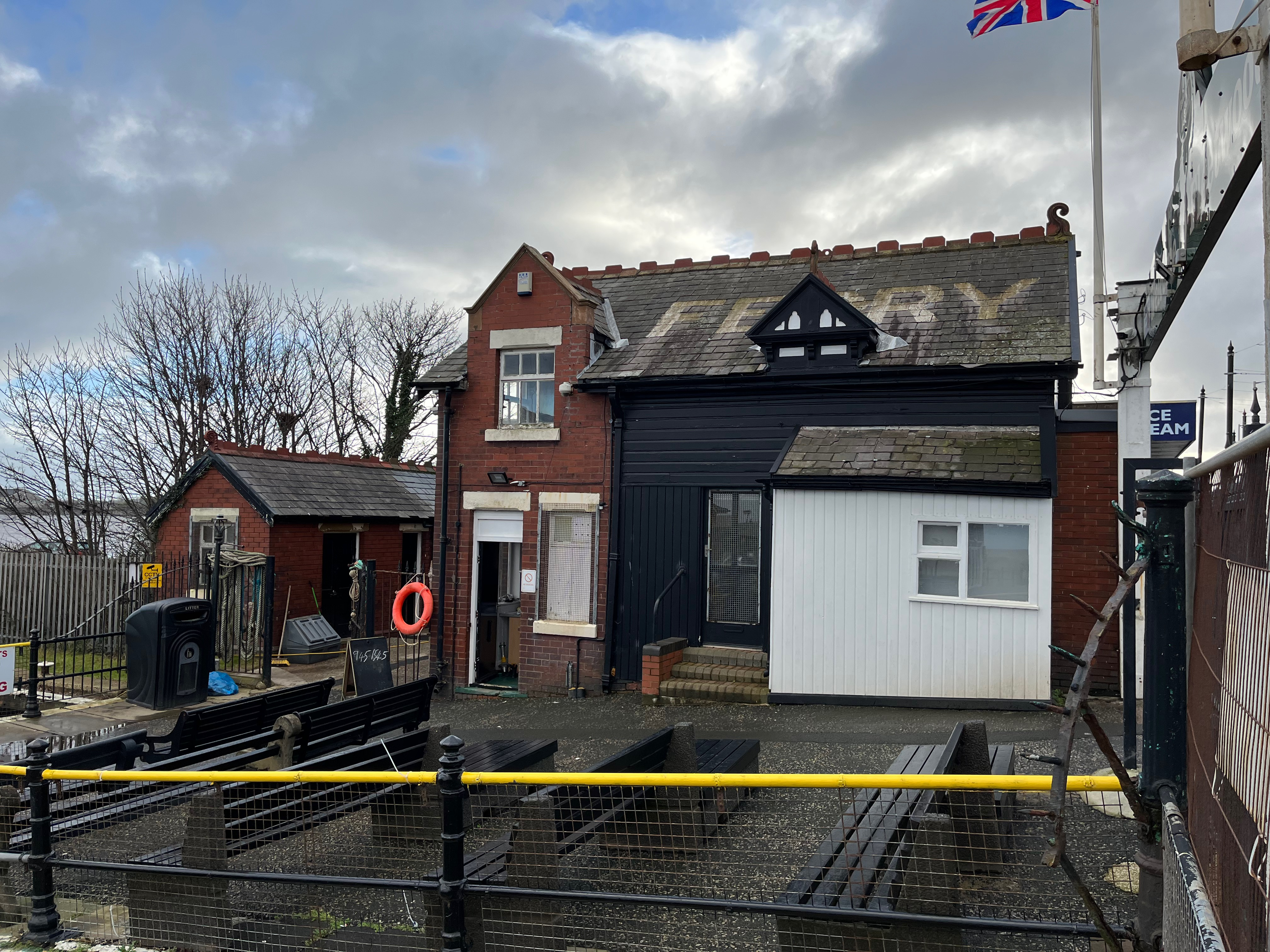
Ferry terminal building, Fleetwood (2023)

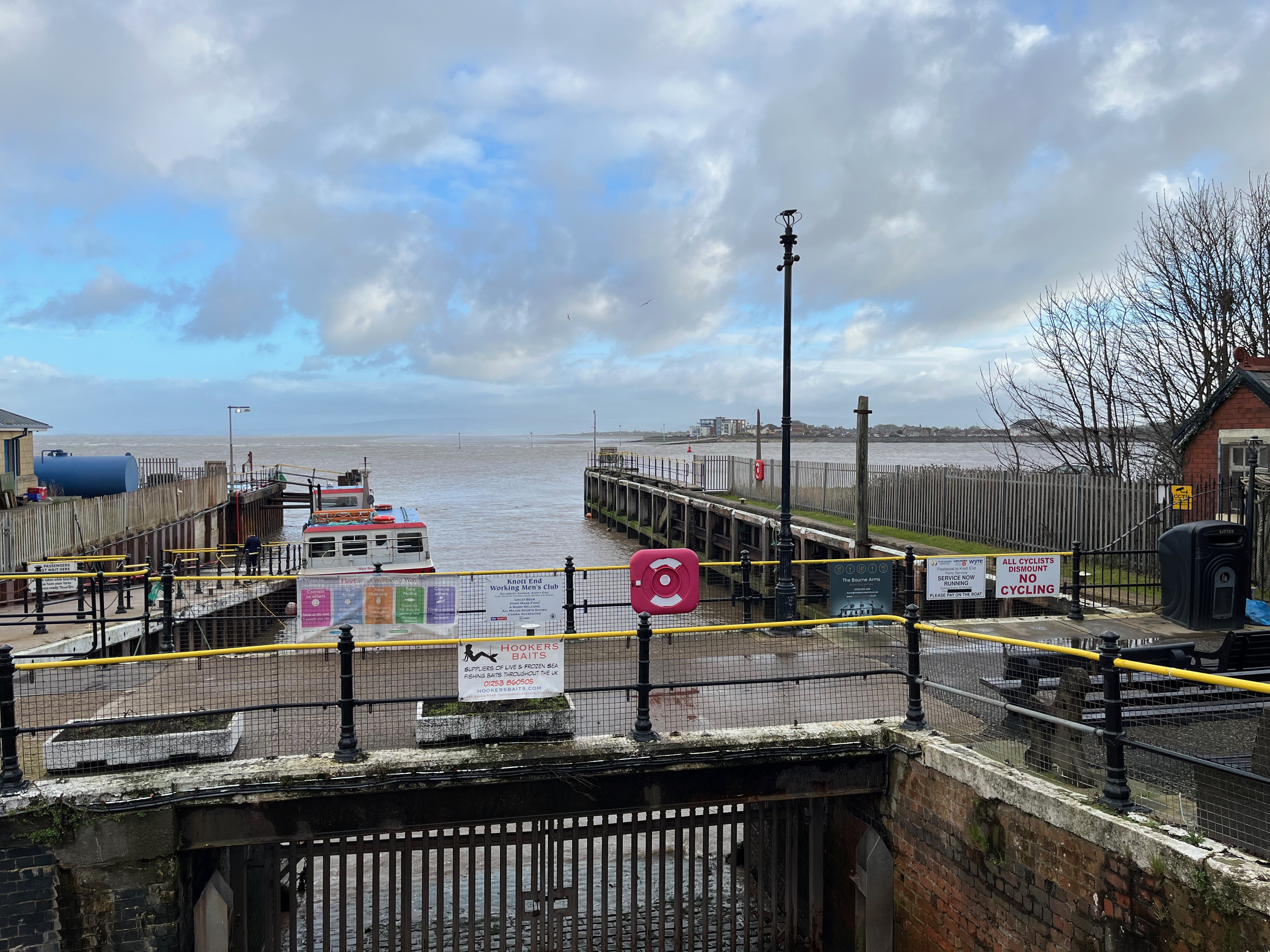
The ferry berthed at Fleetwood, looking across to Knott End
