= Scorton railway station (Lancashire) =

Disused railway station in Scorton, Lancashire

Coordinates: 53.9341°N 2.7671°W

Scorton

General information
- Location: Scorton, Lancashire; England
- Platforms: 2

Other information
- Status: Disused

History
- Original company: Lancaster and Preston Junction Railway
- Pre-grouping: London and North Western Railway
- Post-grouping: London, Midland and Scottish Railway

Key dates
- 26 June 1840: Opened
- August 1840: Resited
- 1 May 1939: Closed
Location
- Location within the Borough of Wyre Location within Lancashire

Scorton railway station served the village of Scorton, Lancashire, England, from 1840 to 1939 on the Lancaster and Preston Junction Railway.

== History ==
The first station was opened on 26 June 1840 by the Lancaster and Preston Junction Railway. It was short-lived, with only a sentry box, closing one and a half months later in August 1840. It was replaced by a new station half a mile to the south. This station featured a signal box and a station building on the southbound platform. It closed on 1 May 1939. Nothing remains of either station.

Preceding station	Historical railways	Following station
Bay Horse; Line open, station closed	Lancaster and Preston Junction Railway	Garstang and Catterall; Line open, station closed
