= Myerscough College =

College in Lancashire, England

- Motto: Inspiring Excellence
- Established: 1894 (as the Lancashire County Institute of Agriculture)
- Principal: Wes Johnson
- Location: St Michael's Road, Myerscough and Bilsborrow, Preston, Lancashire, PR3 0RY, England; 53.8531°N 2.7631°W
- Campus: Rural (Preston)
- Website: www.myerscough.ac.uk
- Location in the Borough of Wyre

Myerscough College (pronounced as Myers-coe) is a Higher and Further Education college near Bilsborrow on the Fylde in Lancashire, England.

== Origins ==
Myerscough College was founded on 15 March 1894 as the Lancashire County Institute of Agriculture. The college's origins began in 1890, when the then newly formed Lancashire County Council set up a sub-committee with the remit of making grants available to help local agriculture. The Chairman of the Farming Sub Committee, Reverend Leonard Charles Wood, was responsible for overseeing the purchase and management of a new educational establishment for agriculture.

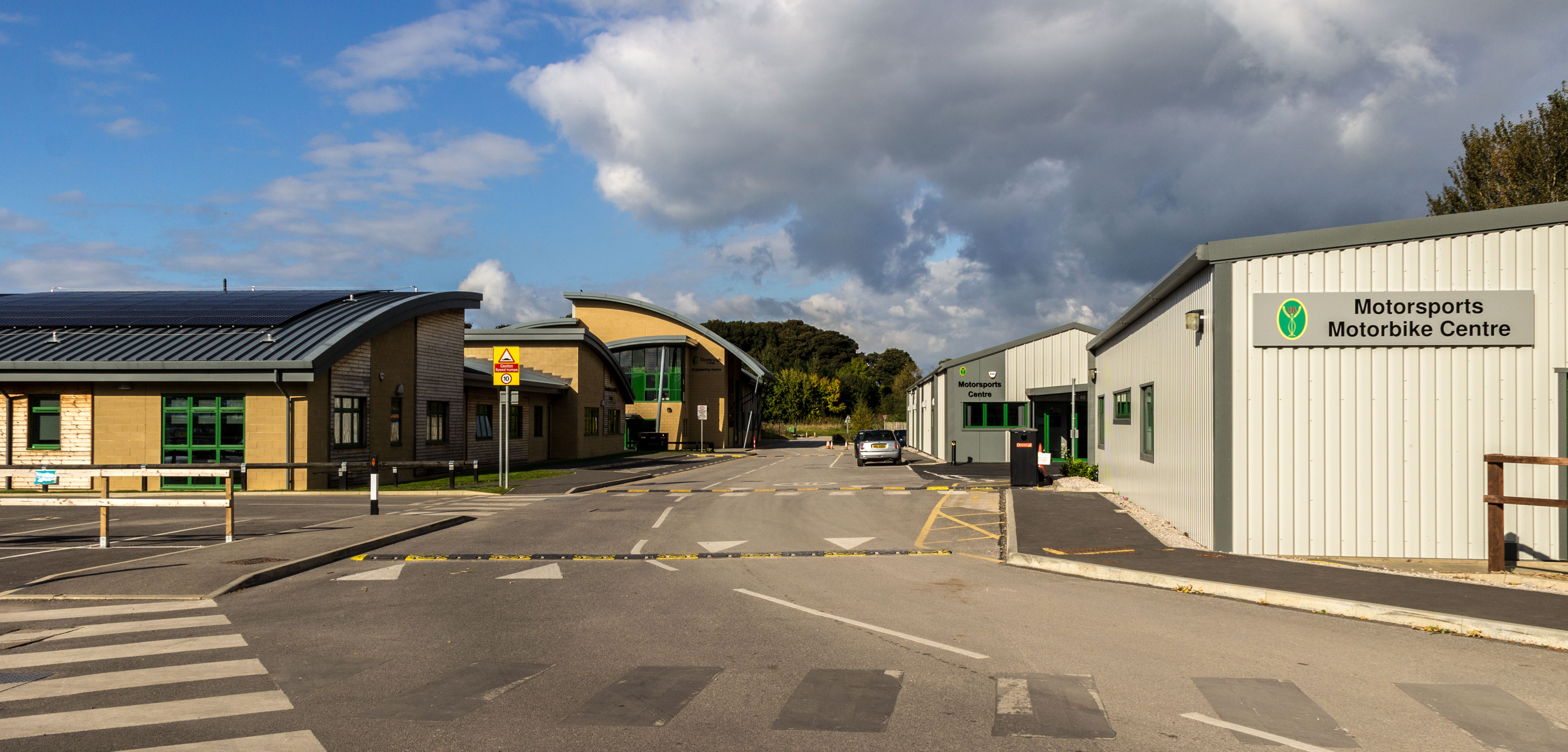
College buildings (2016)

The original college was based at Home Farm near the village of Hutton, south of Preston, and moved to its current site in 1969, as recorded by a stone plaque unveiled by Queen Elizabeth II on the teaching block built at that time. The new college was built on the site of Myerscough Hall, near St Michael's Road in Bilsborrow, and is in the rural parish of Myerscough and Bilsborrow. In 1993 the college was renamed Myerscough College following the passing of the Further and Higher Education Act 1992.

The college occupies the substantial grounds previously occupied by the hall and farm, extending to River Brock on the north side, and St Michael's Road on the south. The college also leases several local farms, including Lee Farm and Lodge Farm, for agricultural research and teaching purposes. The college estate extends to 605 hectares, and the campus has extensive residential accommodation.

== Present day ==
30 June 2017 saw the launch of its Higher Education provision, University Centre Myerscough, in partnership with the University of Central Lancashire, who validates the college's degrees.

Other centres have also been added in Witton Park, Blackburn; Croxteth Hall, Liverpool; Old Trafford Cricket Ground, Manchester and Walton Hall, Warrington. Each offers a variety of land-based, animal or sport courses.

In September 2006, the college was the setting for former BBC Gardeners' World presenter Christine Walkden's television programme, Christine's Garden. Walkden is a former student at the college, and in the programme she gave advice on how to present and sell produce; and she also reminisced about her time at the college. The shows aired on BBC2 in March 2007. On 11 October 2006, Equine expert Monty Roberts, the inspiration for the Robert Redford film, The Horse Whisperer appeared at the college as part of his "The Horses in My Life" tour. On 20 February 2007, Prince Edward, Earl of Wessex visited the college and toured around the college's agricultural education facilities, where he was said to be very impressed by the welcome he received at the college. And in June 2007, the Bishop of New York, the Right Rev E Don Taylor, spent three days at the college, as part of a two-month sabbatical learning about the mission and ministry of rural communities and churches.

== Study ==
In 2011 the college had over 7,000 students, of whom 2,500 were full-time, with about 1,000 studying Higher Education. Subjects to study at Myerscough College include arboriculture, agriculture, ecology, countryside management, motorsports, mechanisation, sports and leisure, golf, landscape design, animal care, equine studies, horticulture, sportsturf, photography, and farriery/metalwork. Short courses for industry range from crane handling to crop spraying, and short leisure courses from caravan manoeuvring to floristry. Many leading football groundsmen study turf science at Myerscough. It has also been in the forefront of developing on-line and blended learning courses for the land-based industries, allowing students to work full or part-time and to study on-line to complete foundation degree and Honour degree programmes.

In August 2005, the college announced a partnership with Lancashire County Cricket Club where they would offer students the opportunity to study at the club's indoor cricket centre for a national diploma combining academic studies in sport with practical skill development in cricket.

== Facilities ==
Myerscough College is home to the National Centre for arboriculture, and is recognised internationally for its specialism in this subject.

There is an equine arena, a nine-hole golf course and simulated golf training centre, the plant centre, an off-road driving track, nine-hole disc golf course, sports fields and a sports centre and gymnasium, as well as an arboretum, woods, fields, ponds and the River Brock on the site. The Frank Peregrine Higher Education Centre was opened in 2006 and extended in 2010.

The college houses the Rural Business Centre, which provides support for rural business in the form of courses, advice, links and the Rural Business Incubator for start-up businesses.

The sports centre, which cost £1.8M, was opened in 2004, and contains a golf studio. In May 2007, the college opened a milking parlour at Lodge Farm which can facilitate 50 cows at one time, which the college stated showed their long-term commitment to agriculture. A further development in sport came in 2016 with the opening of the High Performance Sports Centre. The state-of-the-art facility cost £3.2 million and complements the College's existing Sports Centre. The works consisted of the demolition and removal of an existing Sportsturf centre and workshop, as well as the demolition of a derelict, disused pavilion, to make way for the erection of the new build, which includes a purpose-built hall as well as a Strength & Conditioning suite and offices, and a separate new Sportsturf Management facility.

In 2017, the College opened its Food and Farming Innovation and Technology (FFIT) Centre for industry training and research in beef production. The main FFIT Centre is a red brick, two-storey building to house the research and teaching facilities that link with the various technologies in the nearby Livestock Innovation Centre and farm. This includes specialist teaching, demonstration and research facilities including a teaching laboratory, soil laboratory, instrumentation room, production development kitchen, as well as a conference room, general teaching rooms, offices, a dining area and changing facilities.

== Notable former students ==
- Jane Scott, Baroness Scott of Bybrook, Conservative politician
- Christine Walkden, TV & Radio Horticulturist best known for presenting Gardners' World
- Paul Burgess, groundsman
- Joe Bunney, former footballer for Rochdale F.C. and Bolton Wanderers F.C.
- Anthony Pilkington, footballer for Fleetwood Town
- William Still, football manager for Southampton
- Rick Shiels, a YouTuber and golf professional
- Amari Williams, NBA player for the Boston Celtics
