= Myerscough (surname) =

Myerscough (UK: /ˈmaɪərskoʊ/ MIRE-skoh, locally /ˈmɑːskrə/ MAH-skrə, US: /ˈmaɪərskaʊf/ MIRE-skowf) is an English surname, which is most common in Lancashire. The name originates from the hamlet of Myerscough, in the parish of Myerscough and Bilsborrow near Preston. The town with the highest proportions of Myerscoughs is Fleetwood in Lancashire. The name is virtually unheard of in the Midlands and the south of England. Historically the name had the more phonetic spelling 'Myerscoe'.

Notable people with the surname include:

- Bill Myerscough (1930–1977), British footballer
- Carl Myerscough, British athlete
- Clarence Myerscough, British violinist
- Henry Myerscough, British viola player
- Joseph Myerscough, British footballer
- Melissa Myerscough, American athlete
- Morag Myerscough, British designer
- Samuel Myerscough, British musician
- Sarah Myerscough, British artist and sculptor
- Sue E. Myerscough, American judge
- Valerie Myerscough (1942–1980), British mathematician and astrophysicist
