= Cogie Hill railway station =

Disused railway station in Lancashire, England

Cogie Hill Halt

General information
- Location: Winmarleigh, Lancashire; England
- Coordinates: 53.9148°N 2.8472°W
- Grid reference: SD444468
- Platforms: 1

Other information
- Status: Disused

History
- Original company: Garstang and Knot-End Railway
- Pre-grouping: North Eastern Railway
- Post-grouping: London, Midland and Scottish Railway

Key dates
- 5 December 1870: Opened
- 9 March 1872: Closed to passengers
- 17 May 1875: Reopened
- 31 March 1930: Closed
Location

Cogie Hill railway station, also known as Cogie Hill Halt railway station and Cogie Hill Crossing railway station served the village of Winmarleigh, Lancashire, England, from 1870 to 1930 on the Garstang and Knot-End Railway.

== History ==
The station opened on 5 December 1870 by the Garstang and Knot-End Railway. It was situated on the west side of Island Lane. Like Garstang Town and Cockerham Cross Halt, The station closed to passengers on 9 March 1872 due to a faulty locomotive. Services resumed on 17 May 1875 when a new engine was purchased. Moss Litter works opened to the north in 1889 and it was given its own private siding. In the late 1920s, the bus service was introduced and it deemed the passenger services uneconomic so it closed on 31 March 1930.

| Preceding station | Disused railways | Following station |
|---|---|---|
| Cockerham Cross Halt; Line and station closed | Garstang and Knot-End Railway | Nateby; Line and station closed |
