= Carr Lane railway station =

Disused railway station in Pilling, Lancashire

Carr Lane

General information
- Location: Pilling, Lancashire; England
- Coordinates: 53.9225°N 2.9135°W
- Grid reference: SD401477
- Platforms: 1

Other information
- Status: Disused

History
- Original company: Knott End Railway
- Pre-grouping: Knott End Railway
- Post-grouping: London, Midland and Scottish Railway

Key dates
- July 1921: Opened
- 31 March 1930: Closed
Location

Carr Lane railway station, also known as Carr Lane Halt railway station, served the village of Pilling, in Lancashire, England, on the Garstang and Knot-End Railway.

== History ==
The station opened in July 1921 by the Knott End Railway. It was situated on the west side of the street it was named after, Carr Lane. The only facilities the station had was a short platform that was later extended and a timber waiting room. It was initially served by all of the services but it became a request stop in the 1921–1922 winter timetable. Like the other stations on the line, it struggled when the bus service was introduced, so it closed on 31 March 1930. The tracks were lifted in 1953.

Preceding station	Disused railways	Following station
Preesall	Knott End Railway	Pilling
