= Nateby railway station =

Closed railway station in Lancashire, England

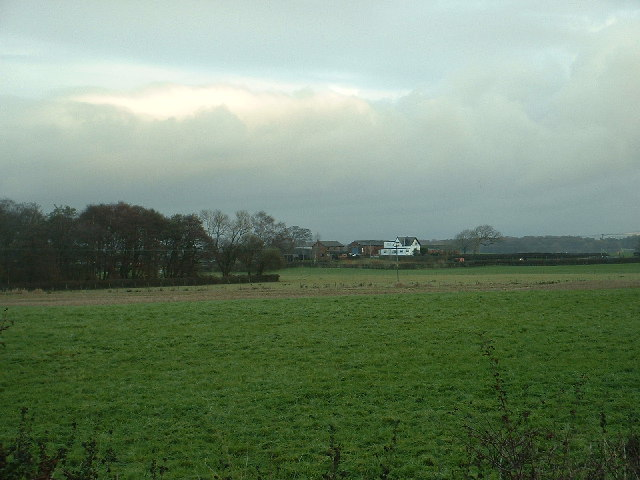
- View towards the former station (location occupied by a farm)

General information
- Location: Nateby, Wyre, Lancashire; England
- Coordinates: 53.90818°N 2.82517°W
- Platforms: 2

Other information
- Status: Disused

History
- Original company: Garstang and Knot-End Railway
- Pre-grouping: Knott End Railway
- Post-grouping: London, Midland and Scottish Railway

Key dates
- 5 November 1870: Opened as Winmarleigh
- 29 March 1872: Services ceased
- 17 May 1875: Services resumed
- 1 January 1902: Renamed Nateby
- 31 March 1930: Closed to passengers
- 13 November 1950: Closed to goods
Location

Nateby railway station served the village Nateby in Lancashire, England. It was originally named Winmarleigh railway station after the landowner at that time and was renamed after his death in 1902. Originally only a halt with the platform on the southern side of the line, it received a passing loop in 1909 and a second platform on the northern side, and by 1910 it also had a goods siding with a cattle dock. Passenger services were withdrawn in 1930, and the station closed altogether in 1950.

Preceding station	Disused railways	Following station
Cogie Hill Halt	Garstang and Knot-End Railway	Garstang Town
