= Garstang Road Halt railway station =

Disused railway station in Stake Pool, Lancashire

Garstang Road Halt

General information
- Location: Wyre; England
- Coordinates: 53.9201°N 2.8806°W
- Grid reference: SD422474
- Platforms: 1

Other information
- Status: Disused

History
- Original company: London, Midland and Scottish Railway
- Post-grouping: London, Midland and Scottish Railway

Key dates
- October 1923: Opened
- 31 March 1930: Closed
Location

Garstang Road railway station served the hamlet of Stake Pool, Lancashire, England, from 1923 to 1930 on the Knott End branch of the London, Midland and Scottish Railway.

== History ==
The station opened in October 1923 by the London, Midland and Scottish Railway. It was situated on the east side of Garstang Road. There were seven initial services but when it opened, road traffic was already dwindling passenger numbers and when the bus services were introduced in the late 1920s, it was deemed uneconomic to continue so it closed on 31 March 1930. The track was lifted in 1963 but the waiting shelter was still extant.

Preceding station	Disused railways	Following station
Pilling; Line and station closed	Garstang and Knot-End Railway	Cockerham Cross Halt; Line and station closed
