= Garstang and Catterall railway station =

Disused station in Lancashire, England

Garstang & Catterall
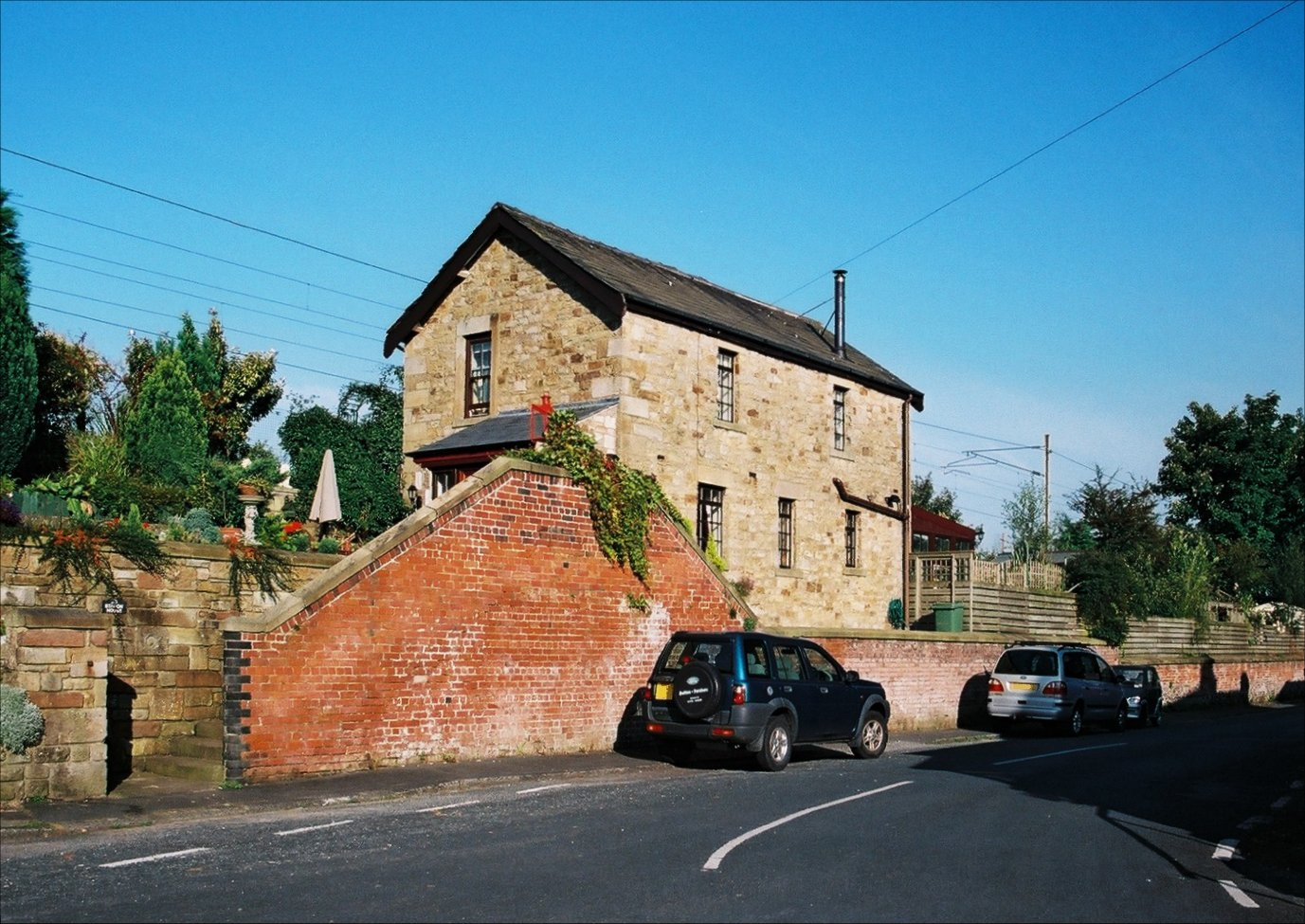
- The former station house, with steps that originally led to the platforms

General information
- Location: Barnacre-with-Bonds, Wyre; England
- Coordinates: 53.8890°N 2.7479°W
- Platforms: 3

Other information
- Status: Disused

History
- Original company: Lancaster and Preston Junction Railway
- Pre-grouping: London and North Western Railway
- Post-grouping: London, Midland and Scottish Railway

Key dates
- 26 June 1840: Opened
- 3 February 1969: Closed
Location
- Location within the Borough of Wyre Location within Lancashire

Garstang and Catterall railway station served as the interchange between the Garstang and Knot-End Railway and the London and North Western Railway, in Lancashire, England. The station was in the parish of Barnacre-with-Bonds, close to the village of Catterall, adjacent to the Lancaster Canal, and opposite the Kenlis Arms Pub.

This station was on the Lancaster and Preston Junction Railway (now part of the West Coast Main Line) between Preston and Lancaster. It opened on 26 June 1840, originally named Garstang Station. It was the last of the stations between Preston and Lancaster to close, on 3 February 1969.

The station had a platform for each direction of the main line, and a third platform for the single-track branch line to Pilling and Knott End.

Preceding station	Disused railways	Following station
Scorton	Lancaster and Preston Junction Railway	Brock
Garstang Town	Garstang and Knot-End Railway	Terminus
