= Knott End railway station =

Disused railway station in Knott End-on-Sea, Lancashire

Knott End
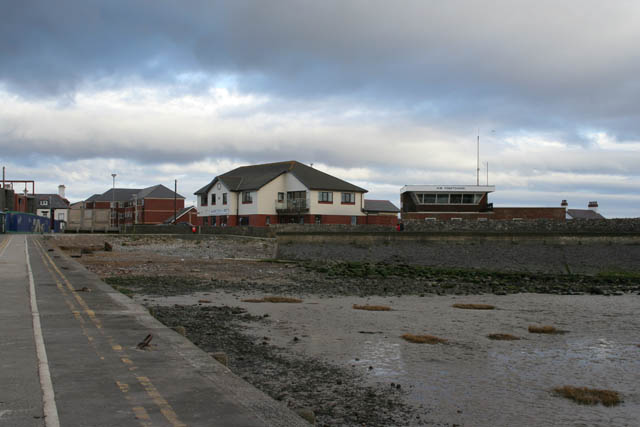
- The site of the station in 2010

General information
- Location: Knott End-on-Sea, Lancashire; England
- Coordinates: 53.928°N 2.9967°W
- Grid reference: SD346484
- Platforms: 2

Other information
- Status: Disused

History
- Original company: Knott End Railway
- Pre-grouping: Knott End Railway
- Post-grouping: London, Midland and Scottish Railway

Key dates
- 30 July 1908: Opened
- 31 March 1930: Closed to passengers
- 13 November 1950: Closed to goods
Location

Knott End railway station served Knott End on Sea in Lancashire, England, with a ferry service to Fleetwood. The station opened in 1908 and closed for passengers in 1930 and for freight in 1950.

== History ==
The station opened on 30 July 1908 by the Knott End Railway. It was situated on the south side of Bourne May Road. It had a station building and a goods shed with two sidings, a loading ramp, a crane and a weighbridge, all of which were to the west. Like the other stations on the line, the bus service introduced in the 1920s deemed this station uneconomical, so it closed to passengers on 31 March 1930 and to goods on 13 November 1950. The track was lifted after 1953. The station building is now a cafe.

Preceding station	Disused railways	Following station
Terminus	Knott End Railway	Preesall
