= Preesall railway station =

Closed railway station in Lancashire, United Kingdom

Preesall

General information
- Location: Preesall, Lancashire; England
- Coordinates: 53.9206°N 2.968°W
- Grid reference: SD365475
- Platforms: 1

Other information
- Status: Disused

History
- Original company: Knott End Railway
- Pre-grouping: Knott End Railway
- Post-grouping: London, Midland and Scottish Railway

Key dates
- 3 August 1908: Opened
- 31 March 1930: Closed to passengers
- 13 November 1950: Closed to goods
Location

Preesall railway station served Preesall in Lancashire, England, from 1908 to 1930, although goods continued until 1950.

== History ==
The station opened on 3 August 1908 by the Knott End Railway. It was situated on the east side of Park Lane. To the south was the goods yard which had a goods shed, a loading ramp, a crane and a weighbridge. The bus service introduced in the 1920s deemed the station uneconomic so it closed on 31 March 1930 and closed to goods on 13 November 1950. Only the platform face still remains.

Preceding station	Disused railways	Following station
Knott End-on-Sea	Knott End Railway	Carr Lane
