= River Brock =

River in Lancashire, England

Coordinates: 53°51′N 2°49′W

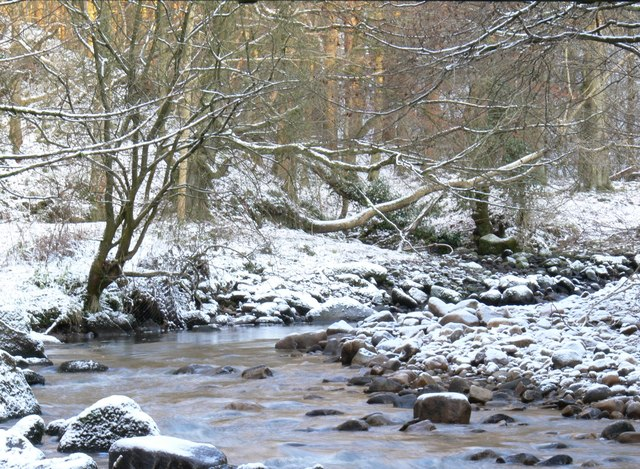
River Brock at Snape Rake Lane

The River Brock is a river running through the county of Lancashire in England.

Commencing its journey on Fair Snape Fell, the infant River Brock runs beneath the Bleasdale Circle before continuing via Claughton and Bilsborrow to St Michael's On Wyre, where it joins the River Wyre. A significant length of River Brock forms the northern boundary of City of Preston, Lancashire.

== Tributaries ==
- New Draught
  - Old River Brock
    - Bacchus Brook
    - Bull Brook
  - Withney Dike
  - Woodplumpton Brook
    - Swill Brook
    - Blundel Brook
  - New Mill Brook
    - Barton Brook
      - Dean Brook
      - Sparling Brook
        - Factory Brook
      - Westfield Brook
        - Mill Brook
          - Whinnyclough Brook
            - Bullsnape Brook
- Lickhurst Brook
- Huds Brook
- Winsnape Brook
- Clough Heads Brook
