= Barton and Broughton railway station =

Disused railway station in Lancashire, England

Barton and Broughton
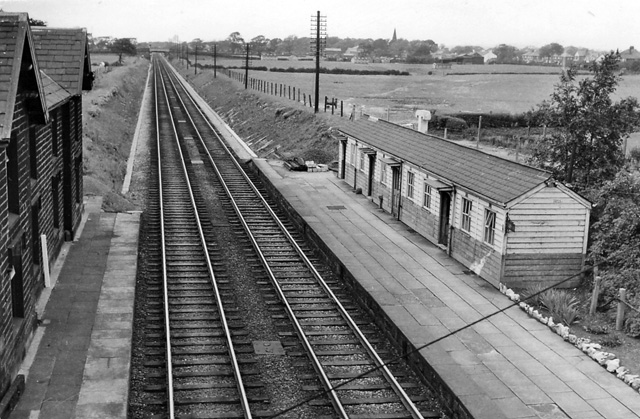
- The station in 1962

General information
- Location: Barton, Lancashire; England
- Coordinates: 53.8212°N 2.7383°W
- Grid reference: SD514363
- Platforms: 2

Other information
- Status: Disused

History
- Original company: Lancaster and Preston Junction Railway
- Pre-grouping: London and North Western Railway
- Post-grouping: London, Midland and Scottish Railway

Key dates
- November 1840: Opened as Broughton
- 1861: Name changed to Barton and Broughton
- 1 May 1939: Closed to passengers
- 31 May 1965: Closed to goods
Location
- Location within the City of Preston district Location within Lancashire

Barton and Broughton railway station served the villages of Barton and Broughton in Lancashire, England, from 1840 to 1965 on the Lancaster and Preston Junction Railway.

== History ==
The station opened as Broughton in November 1840 by the Lancaster and Preston Junction Railway. To the south were goods sidings and on the northbound platform was the station building. The station's name changed to Barton and Broughton in 1861. It closed to passengers on 1 May 1939 and to goods on 31 May 1965.

Preceding station	Historical railways	Following station
Roebuck; Line open, station closed	Lancaster and Preston Junction Railway	Preston; Line and station open
