= Cockerham Cross Halt railway station =

Disused railway station in Cockerham, Lancashire

Cockerham Cross Halt

General information
- Location: Cockerham, Lancashire; England
- Coordinates: 53.917°N 2.8609°W
- Grid reference: SD435471
- Platforms: 0 (initially); 1 (later added)

Other information
- Status: Disused

History
- Original company: Garstang and Knot-End Railway
- Pre-grouping: Knott End Railway
- Post-grouping: London, Midland and Scottish Railway

Key dates
- 5 December 1870: Opened as Cockerham Cross
- 9 March 1872: Services ceased
- 17 May 1875: Services resumed
- July 1923: Name changed to Cockerham Cross Halt
- 31 March 1930: Closed
Location

Cockerham Cross railway station, also known as Cockerham Crossing railway station, was a halt at a level crossing on a road that crossed Cockerham Moss towards Cockerham in Lancashire, England. It opened with the line in 1870 and closed in 1930.

== History ==
The station opened on 5 December 1870 by the Garstang and Knot-End Railway. It was situated north of Garstang Road. Passenger services were ceased on 9 March 1872 due to mechanical faults with the train. Repairs were made and the services resumed but they ceased again on 29 March due to more underlying problems. A new engine was purchased and services resumed again on 17 May 1875. An area map from 1892 shows that there was no platform but a map from 1912 showed one and it was described in an article from 1908 but the exact date it was added is unknown. The station was only served on Thursdays and Saturdays. 'Halt' was added to its name in July 1923. Like the other stations on the line, it struggled due to the introduction of the bus services in the 1920s, so it closed on 31 March 1930. The track was lifted a few years after goods traffic ceased on the line in 1963.

Preceding station	Disused railways	Following station
Garstang Road	Garstang and Knot-End Railway	Cogie Hill Halt
