= Bilsborrow =

Coordinates: 53.854°N 2.744°W

- Village
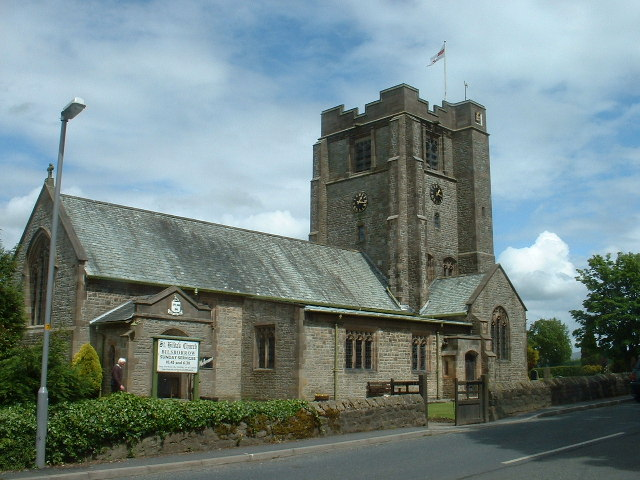
- St Hilda's Church

- Shown within Wyre Borough Location within Lancashire
- Population: 1,479 (2021 census)
- OS grid reference: SD510400
- Civil parish: Myerscough and Bilsborrow
- District: Wyre
- Shire county: Lancashire
- Region: North West
- Country: England
- Sovereign state: United Kingdom
- Post town: PRESTON
- Postcode district: PR3
- Dialling code: 01995
- Police: Lancashire
- Fire: Lancashire
- Ambulance: North West
- UK Parliament: Lancaster and Wyre

Bilsborrow /ˈbɪlzbərə/ is a village and former civil parish, now in the parish of Myerscough and Bilsborrow, in the Wyre district, in the county of Lancashire, England. The village population at the 2011 census was 632 and in the 2021 census 1,479. It is on the A6 road and the Lancaster Canal. It is approximately 1 mile (2 km) east of Myerscough.

Bilsborrow has a primary school, a post office and local shop, and a fish and chip shop, St Hilda's Church of England church and two public houses, the Roebuck and the White Bull, a canalside tavern Owd Nell's Tavern, a Premier Inn hotel, a canalside lodge, a guest house, and a themed thatched hamlet 'village' with restaurant, hotel and tavern.

In 2018, John Cross Church of England Primary School celebrated the 300th anniversary of its founding by John Cross, a local Christian benefactor.

In the former parish is the hamlet of Duncombe. In the 1950s there was a large paper mill at Matshead. The River Brock is crossed by Walmesley Bridge; it is dated 1883 but looks much older.

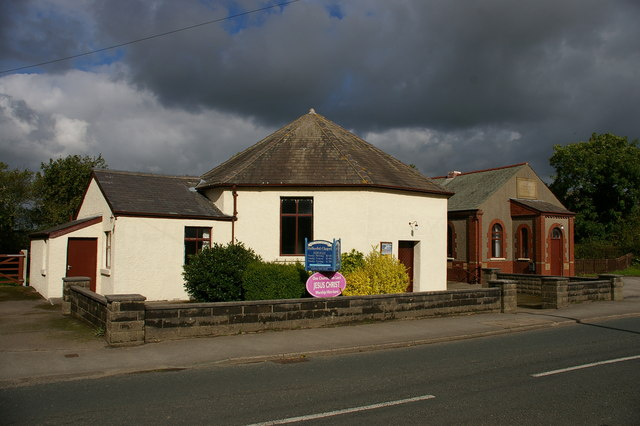
Bilsborrow Methodist Chapel

== Civil parish ==
Bilsborrow was formerly a township in the parish of Garstang, from 1866 Bilsborrow was a civil parish in its own right, on 1 April 2003 the parish was abolished and merged with Myerscough to form "Myerscough & Bilsborrow". In 2001 the parish had a population of 410. The population of Myerscouch & Bilsborrow in 2021 was 1,479.

== Transport ==
As of March 2026 the village’s transport is run by Stagecoach Cumbria and North Lancashire.
