= Lancaster and Preston Junction Railway =

British railway company (1840–1859)

The Lancaster and Preston Junction Railway opened its twenty-mile line in 1840 in Lancashire, England. The company was not commercially successful. When the Lancaster and Carlisle Railway opened in 1846, the L&PJR became part of a busy trunk railway. It had never had the money to provide substantial track equipment or proper signalling arrangements. Most of the line is in use today as part of the West Coast Main Line railway and has been electrified. None of the L&PJR stations are still in use.

A chaotic situation developed in which the company did not have a legal board of directors and the Carlisle company ran unauthorised trains over the line. The Lancaster Canal Company had a yearly lease of the line and was unwilling to spend money on improvements without security of tenure. No proper system of safe operation was imposed and in 1848 a rear-end collision took place at Bay Horse station exposing the shortcomings. The situation was regularised at the end of 1848 when the Lancaster and Carlisle Railway took control. By then the London and North Western Railway was exercising oversight of the L&CR, and formal transfer to the LNWR took place in 1859.

== Conception and authorisation ==
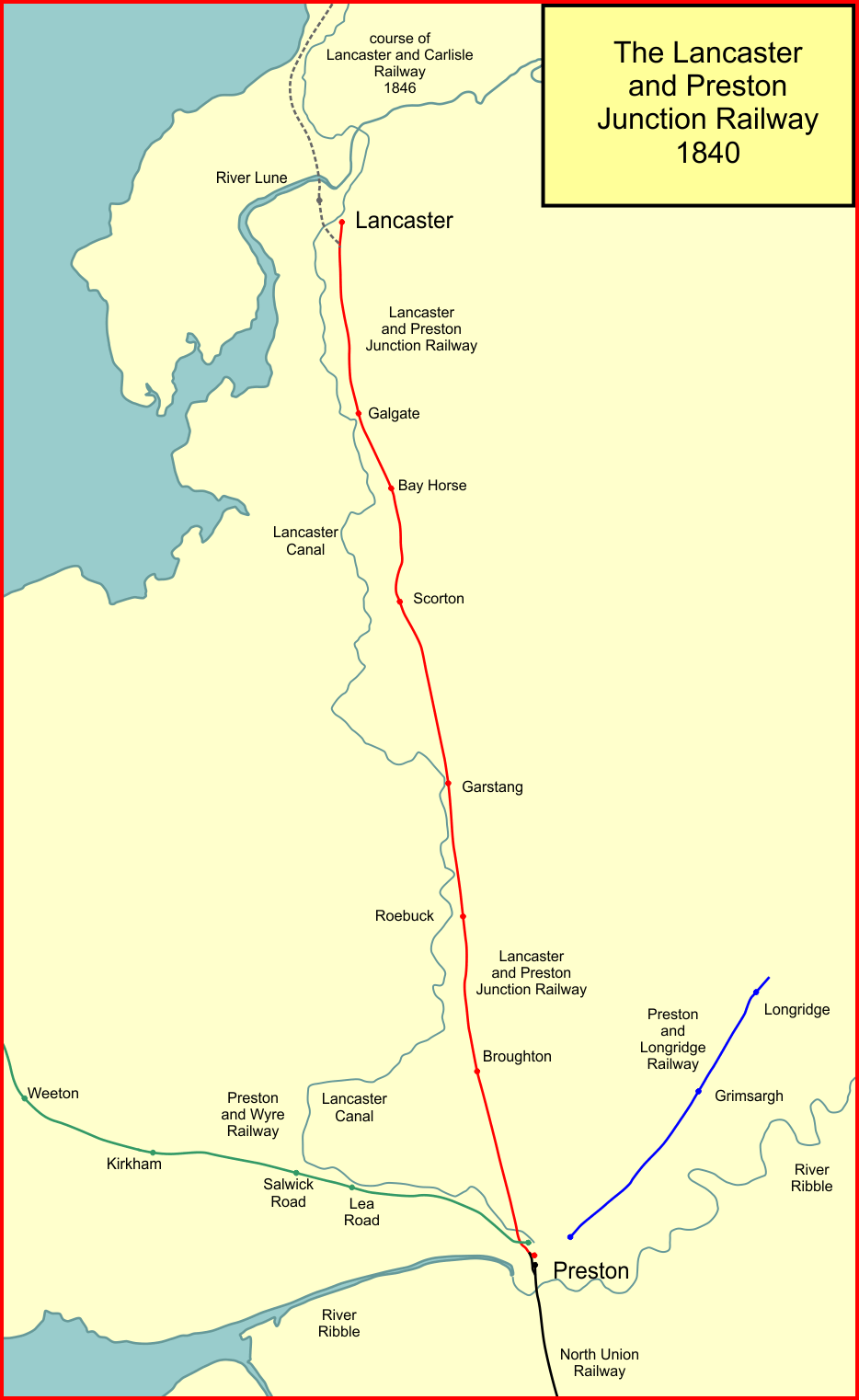
The Lancaster and Preston Junction Railway in 1840

As the railway network of Great Britain developed, a line connecting the north-west of England to Scotland was suggested by Joseph Locke in 1835. The North Union Railway was authorised in 1834, taking up unused powers to build a line to Preston from the south. This aroused considerable interest in Lancaster where a railway connection was thought highly desirable. At a public meeting on 12 April 1836 it was agreed to build a line between Lancaster and Preston. The NUR connection from Wigan to Preston did not open until 1838.

Lancaster and Preston Junction Railway Act 1837
- Act of Parliament
- Parliament of the United Kingdom
- Long title: An Act for making and maintaining a Railway from the Town of Lancaster to the Town of Preston in the County Palatine of Lancaster.
- Citation: 7 Will. 4 & 1 Vict. c. xxii

Dates
- Royal assent: 5 May 1837

Text of statute as originally enacted

Lancaster would not wait for the NUR line to Preston to be ready, and on 5 May the Lancaster and Preston Junction Railway Act 1837 (7 Will. 4 & 1 Vict. c. xxii) was authorised by Parliament. Share capital was £250,000.

Construction was expected to be straightforward and the return on investment was anticipated to be 10%, revised to 18% before opening. The line was twenty miles (32 km) long and the engineer was Joseph Locke. The Lancaster terminus was to be on South Road, south of the Lancaster Canal adjacent to Railway Street. At this stage any route northwards was uncertain and the canal was an important connection. When completed the station comprised a handsome building. The company made its Preston terminus at Dock Street near the Lancaster Canal, but the site had no other accommodation.

The rails were of the parallel form, (that is, not fish-bellied). Larch sleepers were used on embankments and stone block sleepers elsewhere.

== Opening ==
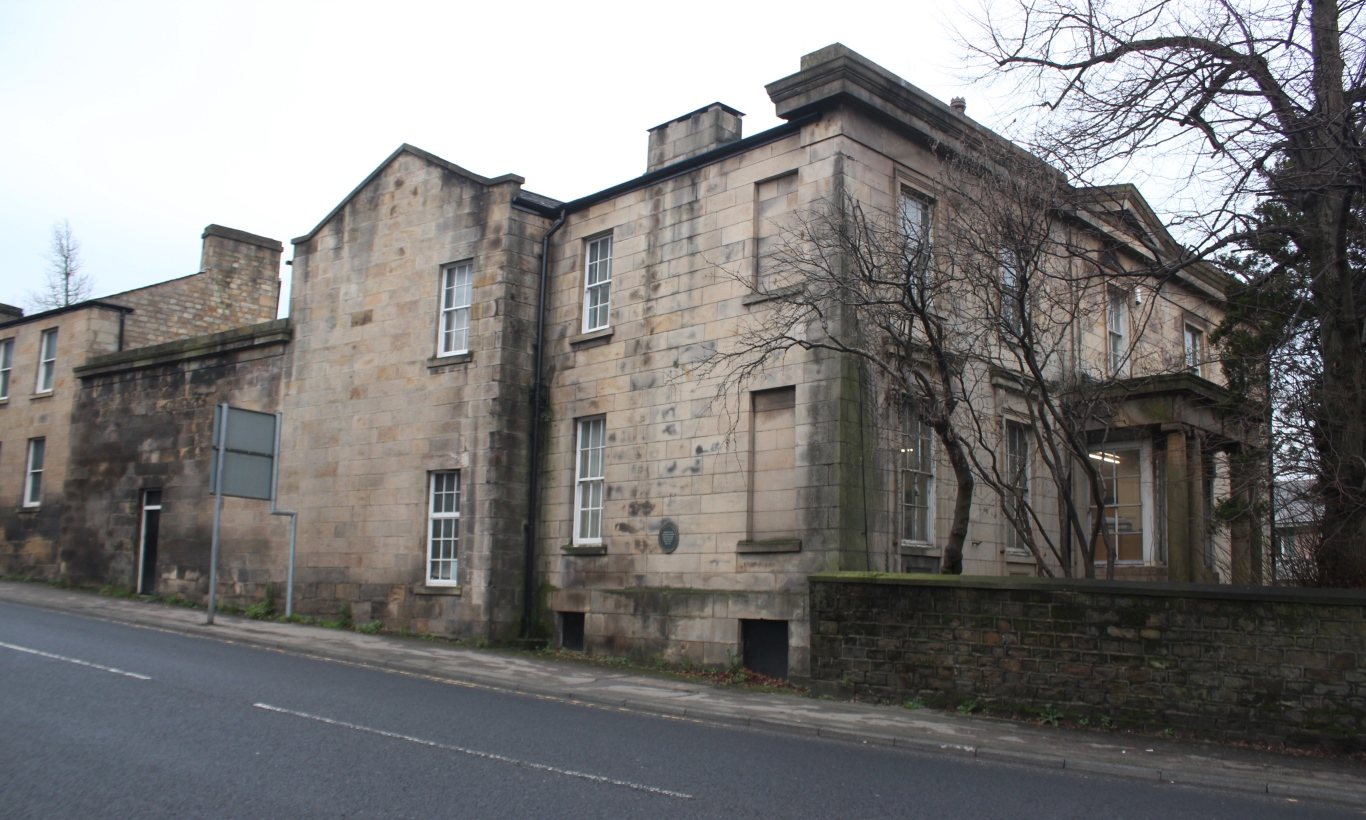
The L&PJR's Lancaster terminus is now part of the city's hospital

The line was opened ceremonially on 25 June 1840 and a public service operated from the following day. Five passenger trains ran each way every weekday, of which two had through coaches to and from London; on Sundays, only these "mail" trains ran. Only one train a day conveyed third class passengers. Traffic was disappointing: while Lancaster remained a terminus, its trade alone could not sustain a railway particularly because of competition from the Lancaster Canal whose packet boats had operated since 1833. They were more comfortable than railway carriages and heated in winter. The canal company lowered its fares when the railway opened and the canal ran close to Garstang, the only other sizable intermediate settlement. The boats were drawn by two horses at a canter.

== Conflict with the North Union Railway ==
In 1836, before construction of either line, the NUR had offered to extend its line northward from its intended terminus at Butler Street to Dock Street where it would acquire land for a joint station with the Lancaster company. Mutual running powers at Preston were to be included in the arrangement, and the L&PJR was to reimburse the NUR's expenses within a month of the outlays. The L&PJR delayed agreeing as its own act of Parliament was not yet secured, but in March 1837 the NUR started building the extension, tunnelling under Fishergate, and then the L&PJR committed to paying £1,500 when it was completed. The NUR completed the extension in December 1839 and £1,500 was duly paid. When the L&PJR opened seven months later, the NUR said the payment did not get the L&PJR free use of the line to Butler Street, nor use of the station. This had been on offer, but not taken up, and did not form part of the agreement. Although this appears to have been L&PJR error, it felt aggrieved and relations between the companies were harmed. As Greville and Holt put it, having paid its share in the making of the connecting line, the L&PJR was certainly not going to pay tolls for using it.

The L&PJR had failed to agree an engine working policy until the last moment. The NUR offered to manage the locomotive fleet but the L&PJR had to acquire its share of locomotives. At the last minute the L&PJR agreed to the arrangement but failed to get the complement of locomotives ready in time. The NUR discovered that the L&PJR track was of poor quality and considered that its locomotives were being damaged in running over it; there was evidently friction in day-to-day operation too. The NUR gave six months’ notice in June 1841 to terminate the locomotive arrangement. John Hargreaves who was working freight traffic on the L&PJR line under contract, acquired the L&PJR locomotive fleet and took over the locomotive working.

== Collaboration with the Bolton and Preston Railway ==
The Bolton and Preston Railway built a line from Bolton to Chorley and Hargreaves was working the line. The NUR considered the B&PR a hostile competitor and collaboration between the B&PR and the L&PJR exacerbated bad feeling from the NUR. The Bolton and Preston Railway had intended to build throughout to Preston which would have duplicated much of the NUR route and given it a shorter route from Preston to Manchester. In a change of plan, it now intended to make a junction with the NUR Euxton and reach Preston over the NUR. Its original intention to have a station at Preston remained, and in a further heightening of tension, the B&PR agreed to build the station there for the use of the L&PJR.

The L&PJR used its basic Dock Street station and some trains continued to Butler Street, the NUR Preston station. Passengers travelling through were charged a supplement of 6d, but some left the train at Dock Street and walked to Butler Street to rejoin the same train. The L&PJR terminus at Dock Street was little more than a siding with buffer stops and a short, low timber platform. Access to Fishergate was by way of a cinder path and a flight of steps.

The B&PR station was ready early in 1842. It was adjacent to Maxwell House and sometimes known by that name. It was a terminus, accessed from the north, and could not be used for through trains. The NUR feared that B&PR plans to duplicate the route from Euxton to Preston station might be revived. When the B&PR made its connection at Euxton, it relied on running over the NUR to get to Preston, and the NUR exploited the opportunity to charge high tolls. The B&PR was seriously weakened and was amalgamated with the NUR in 1843.

== Transfer to the Lancaster Canal ==
Lancaster and Preston Junction Railway Act 1843
- Act of Parliament
- Parliament of the United Kingdom
- Long title: An Act to amend the Acts relating to the Lancaster and Preston Junction Railway.
- Citation: 6 & 7 Vict. c. iv

Dates
- Royal assent: 3 April 1843

Text of statute as originally enacted

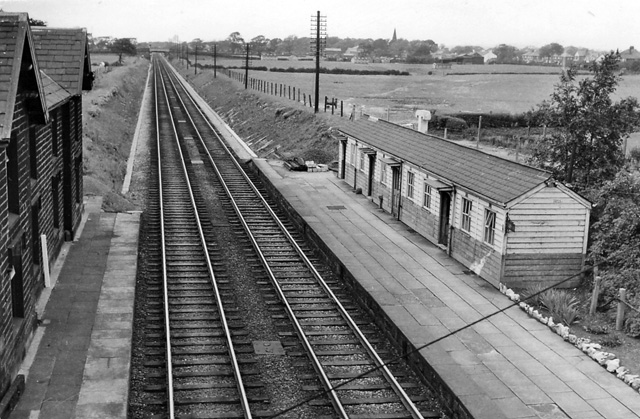
Barton & Broughton Station in 1962

The L&PJR was also weakened by the friction and its dependency on the hostile NUR. In 1842 it sought a purchaser, either the B&PR which was in financial difficulties or the NUR, which declined. On 14 July 1842 the Lancaster Canal Company agreed to take a 21-year lease of the L&PJR, effective from 1 September 1842 which was ratified by the Lancaster and Preston Junction Railway Act 1843 (6 & 7 Vict. c. iv) on 3 April 1843. The lease charge was £30,000 per annum.

The detached B&PR station at Maxwell House continued to be used by the Lancaster trains, but when the B&PR was absorbed by the NUR in 1844, the station passed to the NUR who refused to use the station. The canal company had to negotiate a rent to use Butler Street station which was agreed from 13 February 1844.

== Lancaster and Carlisle Railway ==
The Lancaster and Carlisle Railway was authorised on 6 June 1844, and the west coast main line was being created. The L&CR directors had an interest in the proper management of the L&PJR. In March 1844 a committee of the L&CR recommended leasing the Canal Company, and through that the L&PJR, but ambiguities in the lease of the L&PJR were discovered frustrating the plan. Further attempts to regularise matters were also unsuccessful. From 22 September 1846 the L&CR opened its line from Kendal to Lancaster, and its trains ran on to Preston without formal authorisation. The Lancaster station was a through station and the line by-passed the L&PJR terminus. By this time the London and North Western Railway, formed by amalgamating several networks including the North Union Railway, had come into being and was friendly to the L&CR, condoning the use of the Preston station. Meanwhile, L&PJR trains operated independently from the original Lancaster station to Preston Dock Street.

== Management failings ==
The management of the line was extremely sub-divided and ineffective, summarised by Captain Laffan of the Board of Trade:

In July, 1842, an agreement was made between the Directors of the L&PJR and the Lancaster Canal Company, by which the latter Company were to become lessees of the Railway for 21 years. It was agreed that the whole of the line, works, working stock, &c., were given up to the Canal Company on the 1st September, 1842. Since that time the Canal Company have remained in possession, and have continued to maintain and to work the line. As the Railway Company, however, had no power in 1842 to grant a lease of their line for a longer period than three years, and as the Canal Company had then no power to take a lease of any Railway, one of the conditions of the agreement was, that the two Companies should jointly apply for an Act to confirm the agreement, and to give them what powers were necessary to enable them to execute a formal lease. An Act was obtained in the following session (July, 1843); but upon the formal lease being drawn up, in accordance with the conditions of the agreement, the Railway Company refused to ratify it unless certain additional conditions were introduced to which the Canal Company refused to accede.

The Canal Company have retained possession of the line, and regularly fulfilled the condition of their agreement, paying every year the stipulated rent. The Railway Company acknowledge that the Canal Company is legally in possession, but they assert that they are so only as yearly tenants. The Canal Company, on the other hand, not content to remain in that position, have applied to the Court of Chancery for an injunction to compel the Railway Company to fulfil their original agreement, and grant a formal lease in accordance with it. In this position matters would now have been but for the intervention of a third party. In February, 1844, the Lancaster and Carlisle Railway Company proposed to purchase the portion of the canal between Lancaster and Kendal, and the Canal Company's interest in the Lancaster and Preston Railway. To this the Canal Company were willing to accede, and in the spring of 1844 the Lancaster and Carlisle Railway Company obtained their Act, with powers to make that purchase. The two Companies, however, could not agree upon the terms, and the purchase has therefore never been completed. In the spring of 1846 the L&PJR directors prepared an agreement for the amalgamation of the two Companies. This latter agreement was made by the Directors of the Lancaster and Preston Railway, but the shareholders refused to ratify it, and all the officers of the Company, and all the Directors but one resigned in consequence. It is probable that they did not foresee the consequences of that Act.

As the Act of Parliament embodying the Company specified that all vacancies in the direction were to be filled up by the remaining Directors, and as only one Director remained, it was contended that the Company had no powers to elect a new body of Directors. The Company, acting under this impression, applied to Parliament for powers to elect a new direction, but the committee of the House, to whom the Bill was referred, refused to entertain the application unless it was accompanied by a revision of the tolls upon the line, which, having been authorized in 1837, were much higher than those of the more modern lines. The Company preferred remaining without a direction to consenting a revision of their high tolls, and withdrew the Bill.

Finally, the Lancaster and Carlisle Company gave notice that they would run their own trains over the line, and that they would pay whatever the law should declare to be a legal rate of toll to such parties as should be entitled to receive it. In pursuance of this notice they have run their own trains over this line since the opening of their own, but they have paid no toll. They keep a regular account of the amount of their traffic which passes over the line, and deliver a copy of it monthly to the Canal and to the Lancaster and Preston Railway Companies, and they state their readiness to abide by the decision of a court of law as to what amount of toll they should pay, or to refer that question to the decision of the Railway Commissioners, or to the arbitration of any disinterested parties.

It results from the preceding explanation, that the Lancaster and Carlisle Company are now running their trains over the Lancaster and Preston Railway, not only without the consent of the actual possessors, but in defiance of their opposition, and that till the differences still pending between the proprietors of that line and their lessees are decided, neither party will feel much interested in or will go to much expense to maintain the efficiency of the Railway. The Railway Company throw the whole onus of any deficiency upon the tenants in possession who are charged with the maintenance and repairs, and the tenants in possession will not lay out money upon works from which they may soon be dispossessed. Such a state of things must necessarily endanger the safety of the public using this line.

== Collision at Bay Horse ==
On 21 August 1848, a northbound express train ran into the rear of a stopping train at Bay Horse, a passenger station on the L&PJR about five miles south of Lancaster. The express had arrived at Preston late, and was sent forward after a stopping train. The time interval system of train control (Note: In the early days of railways, the time interval system was used to prevent rear end collisions. A second train was not allowed to leave a station until a certain period of time had elapsed since the previous train left. If the first train was delayed by engine failure or otherwise, the guard would go back down the track and exhibit a hand danger signal to any following train. The time interval was intended to give the guard time to do so. The system was very uncertain in operation and was (much later) superseded by the block system, in which a train may not enter a specified section of line (a "block") until it was known that the preceding train had left it. This required telegraphic communication between the stations.) was in operation. The stopping train was carrying out station duties, when the express train approached at 40 mph. The sole means of warning the driver of the obstruction in the station was a red flag hoisted on a pole, but the flag was indistinct and not seen. The speed of the express was reduced when the driver saw the stopping train ahead, but a collision at 8 mph took place; one person was killed and several injured.

Captain Laffan made a site inspection during the Board of Trade inquiry. He reported that he

found that the signals at the stations were of the rudest description, and that though they might have sufficed for the traffic when this Railway was only a small local line, they are utterly insufficient to provide for the public safety now that it forms part of one of the great chains of railway communication with the North. There is but one signal at each station, so that it is impossible to tell to which line of rails it applies, and that one signal consists simply of a small red flag hoisted to a staff. At some of the stations an attempt is made to keep the flag square with the line by fixing to it small cross sticks, but at others, and particularly at the Bay Horse station, where the present collision occurred, there is simply a small stick at top, and the flag not being held down in any way, blows about freely, and can scarcely be perceived when the wind blows up or down the line. On Monday, when I was at the Bay Horse station, it was a remarkably fine bright day, and having directed the signal to be hoisted. I walked away from it to ascertain at what distance it could be seen. I had scarcely got 200 yards when, turning round by chance, I was surprised at not seeing the flag.

I returned to ascertain the cause, and on getting nearer perceived that in fluttering to the wind it had wrapped itself so tightly round the staff that, at a short distance, it could not be distinguished from it. Had another express train been coming round the neighbouring curve just then, and another local train been standing in the station, it is probable that a second disaster would have occurred.

The insufficiency of these signals was [previously] pointed out to the Company by Captain Coddington, but his suggestions were not attended to.

== Acquisition by the Lancaster and Carlisle Railway ==
Lancaster and Preston Junction Railway Amendment Act 1849
- Act of Parliament
- Parliament of the United Kingdom
- Long title: An Act to amend the several Acts relating to the Lancaster and Preston Junction Railway Company, and to transfer the Management of the Railway to the Lancaster and Carlisle Railway Company.
- Citation: 12 & 13 Vict. c. lxxxvii

Dates
- Royal assent: 1 August 1849

Text of statute as originally enacted

The grievous scandal motivated a change of management, and yet progress was slow. At last, on 13 November 1848, agreement was reached for the L&CR to take over the management of the Lancaster Canal including the L&PJR, confirmed by the Lancaster and Preston Junction Railway Amendment Act 1849 (12 & 13 Vict. c. lxxxvii) of 1 August 1849. The outstanding toll payments for the L&CR trains having run over the Lancaster-Preston line from 22 September 1846 to 31 July 1849, which had been retained but not handed over, amounted to £83,616.

The end of the L&PJR as a legal entity came when the Lancaster and Carlisle Railway Act 1859 (22 & 23 Vict. c. cxxiv) sanctioning amalgamation with the L&CR was passed on 13 August 1859. L&PJR shareholders received nearly £102 of L&CR ordinary stock for each £100 of L&PJR.

With effect from 1 August 1859 the LNWR took a 900-year lease of the L&CR, guaranteeing a minimum dividend of 8%; thus the L&PJR system passed to the LNWR.

== Electrification ==
The Preston to Carlisle section of the West Coast Main Line was electrified on the 25kV overhead system; it was energised on 25 March 1974. A full electrically operated train service started on 6 May 1974. On 7 May Queen Elizabeth II travelled the route and 'drove' the train from Preston to Lancaster.

== Today ==
Today the line is the part of the West Coast Main Line. The North Union station at Preston is now Preston railway station. The L&PJR Lancaster station has closed and none of the L&PJR stations have survived.

== Topography ==
- Lancaster; opened 26 June 1840; sometimes referred to Lancaster Greaves or Lancaster Penny Street in modern works, but simply Lancaster in Bradshaw; closed 1 August 1849, when trains used the Lancaster and Carlisle Railway station;
- Lancaster Old Junction; convergence of Lancaster and Carlisle Railway from 1846;
- Galgate; opened 26 June 1840; closed 1 May 1939;
- Bay Horse: opened 26 June 1840; closed 13 June 1960;
- Scorton; opened 26 June 1840; re-located about half a mile north about August 1840; closed 1 May 1939;
- Junction for Knot-End Railway;
- Garstang; opened 26 June 1840; renamed Garstang & Catterall 1881; closed 3 February 1969;
- Brock; opened August 1849 as replacement for Roebuck; closed 1 May 1939;
- Roebuck; opened 26 June 1840; closed August 1849; replaced by Brock;
- Broughton (second station); opened about November 1840; renamed Barton and Broughton 1861; closed 1 May 1939;
- Broughton (first station); opened 26 June 1840; closed about November 1840;
- Oxheys; opened 2 November 1869 for cattle market; full opening April 1886; closed September 1925;
- Preston: station at Maxwell House; opened 22 June 1843; closed 11 February 1844.
