= Battle of Ormskirk =

Battle in the First English Civil War

Coordinates: 53.5665°N 2.8869°W

Battle of Ormskirk (Battle of Aughton Moss)
- Part of First English Civil War
Date	20 August 1644
Location	Aughton, near Ormskirk, Lancashire
Result	Parliamentarian victory

Belligerents
Royalists	(Kingdom of England) Parliamentarians

Commanders and leaders
Lord Byron; Viscount Molyneux	Sir John Meldrum

Casualties and losses
100 killed 300 prisoners	

Lancashire and Ormskirk

The Battle of Ormskirk (also known as the Battle of Aughton Moss) was fought on 20 August 1644 during the First English Civil War. It was a decisive victory for the Parliamentarian force commanded by Major-General Sir John Meldrum over the Royalist force commanded by Lord Byron.

== Background ==
After their defeat at the Battle of Marston Moor on 2 July 1644, the remaining Royalist cavalry army abandoned the city of York to its fate and retreated over the Pennines. Prince Rupert went to Chester, and it was agreed that Richard, Lord Molyneux and Sir Thomas Tyldesley would venture north into Lancashire on a recruitment sweep. While there, they were joined by Royalist stragglers including Lord Byron, Lord Goring, and Sir Marmaduke Langdale until they numbered a force of some 2,500 horse. However, they were tracked and harried by a force of Lancastrian infantry and horse under the command of Sir John Meldrum who finally caught up with the Cavaliers on Aughton Moor (or Aughton Moss), on the hill to the south-west of Ormskirk in Lancashire on 20 August 1644.

== Battle ==
The Cavaliers, forced to make a stand, stood in battalia upon the Moor. The Roundhead infantry advanced and fired a volley upon which the Cavaliers retreated in disorder, and were then routed by a charge from the Parliamentarian horse. About three hundred Royalist prisoners were taken.

The Royalist commanders Byron and Molyneux were forced to leave their horses and hide in a cornfield. Had it not been late in the evening there would probably have been a greater victory for Meldrum; as it was, the scattered fragments of the defeated party made their escape into Cheshire.

Byron attributed the defeat to the poor performance of Molyneux's regiment:

‘S’r Marmaduke had sent most of his owne horse before, and the retreat beeinge to bee made by my L’d Molyneux his brigade, they (accordinge to their accustomed manner), upon a volley of musket shott from the enemy, fell foule in such fury upon my regiment, that they utterly routed it; and the enemy’s horse, takeinge advantage of the disorder, charged into the lane (through w’ch wee were to pass), tooke and killed some, and stroke such a terror into the rest that they could not bee stopped till they came to Liverpool.

The Perfect Diurnal, a contemporary Parliamentarian newspaper, said of the battle:

The 20 of this instant the Lancashire forces near Ormeskirke beat the whole strength of the enemie, took about 300 prisoners, 500 horse, killed about 100, and forced the rest into Cheshire, intending to follow them: have taken Colonell Hervey, besides 7 Captains and many other considerable prisoners, and Sir Thomas Tilsley and Colonell Preston are either killed or fled privately, for except their corps, were among the dead, and being stript, not known, which may be, we cannot tell what is become of them.

Another account from a letter in Perfect Occurrences, dated Manchester four days after, had the following:

It is to be observed that the same day and at the very same time that the Cheshire forces were engaged at Tarvin, the Lancashire forces had a great victorie over the enemie. Our Major Generall Meldrum having notice of the enemy, marched towards Ormskirk, made fast after them, overtook them on Tuesday in the evening on a moor neer Ormskirk, where they stood in batalia, and upon the first charge of our Musquet, they fled, whereupon our Horse bravely fell upon them, and totally routed them. In the pursuit they took about 800 horse; some letters report a 1,000, and 300 prisoners. By reason of the night we could not improve the victory as wee otherwise might have done. The Lord Byron and the Lord Molleneux were forced to leave their horses, and to hide themselves in a corn field.

The letter is followed by "A List of the names of such persons of Quality as were taken near Ormskirk":

Colonel S^{r} James Prestwich, Lieut. Col. Cottingham; Captains Eccleston, Atherton, Butler, Brooks & Lea; M' Worthington, Esquire, Abraham Langton, Esquire, Lieutenants John Sturbane, Gent. Thomas Mossoike, Walter Chamberlaine, John de Hurst, John Morgrow, Nathan Jones; Coronets, William Johnson, Edward Stanley, Rich. Wright, Gent., Henry Gelibrand; Gentlemen, Peter Bland, William Scot, Thomas Sherburne, -- Marshall, Arthur Butler, James Noricon, Thomas Wotton, & John Fox; John Fulme, clerk, James Bould, clerk; two quartermasters, one servant, and about 250 common souldiers.
