= Vaughton =

Vaughton is a surname. Notable people with the surname include:

- Howard Vaughton (1861–1937), English footballer
- Jonny Vaughton (born 1982), Welsh rugby union player
- Roland Vaughton (1914–1979), Australian cricketer
- Willis Vaughton (1911–2007), English footballer

== See also ==
- Aughton (disambiguation)
