= Scarborough Castle =

Castle in Scarborough, North Yorkshire, England

- Part of North Yorkshire
- Scarborough, England
- The keep and curtain wall

Site information
- Owner: The Crown
- Controlled by: English Heritage
- Condition: Ruinous

Location
- Location within North Yorkshire
- Coordinates: 54.287°N 0.388°W
- Height: 49 feet (15 m)

Site history
- Built: 12th century
- Built by: William le Gros
- In use: Public access
- Materials: Limestone; Sandstone
- Events: English Civil War

Scarborough Castle is a former medieval royal fortress situated on a rocky promontory overlooking the North Sea and Scarborough, North Yorkshire, England. The site of the castle, encompassing the Iron Age settlement, Roman signal station, an Anglo-Scandinavian settlement and chapel, the 12th-century enclosure castle and 18th-century battery, is a scheduled monument of national importance.

Fortifications for a wooden castle were built in the 1130s, but the present stone castle dates from the 1150s. Over the centuries, several other structures were added, with medieval monarchs investing heavily in what was then an important fortress that guarded the Yorkshire coastline, Scarborough's port trade, and the north of England from Scottish or continental invasion. It was fortified and defended during various civil wars, sieges and conflicts, as kings fought with rival barons, faced rebellion and clashed with republican forces, though peace with Scotland and the conclusion of civil and continental wars in the 17th century led to its decline in importance.

Once occupied by garrisons and governors who often menaced the town, the castle has been a ruin since the sieges of the English Civil War, but attracts many visitors to climb the battlements, take in the views and enjoy the accompanying interactive exhibition and special events run by English Heritage.

== History ==
=== Early history of the site ===
Archaeological excavations in the 1920s produced evidence which suggests a hill fort was built on the headland where the castle now stands. Finds were dated to between 900–500 BC, part of the late Bronze Age/early Iron Age. Among finds dating back about 3,000 years, a Bronze Age sword, thought to have been a ritual offering, is on display in the castle exhibition.

A 4th-century Roman signal station, one of several on the Yorkshire coast, was built on the headland at the cliff top. The station was to warn of approaching hostile vessels, and took advantage of a natural source of fresh water which became known as the "Well of Our Lady". The remains of the signal tower were excavated in the 1920s revealing it to be square in plan around a small courtyard. It measured about 33 metres across and was built of wood on stone foundations with a gatehouse and an outer ditch.

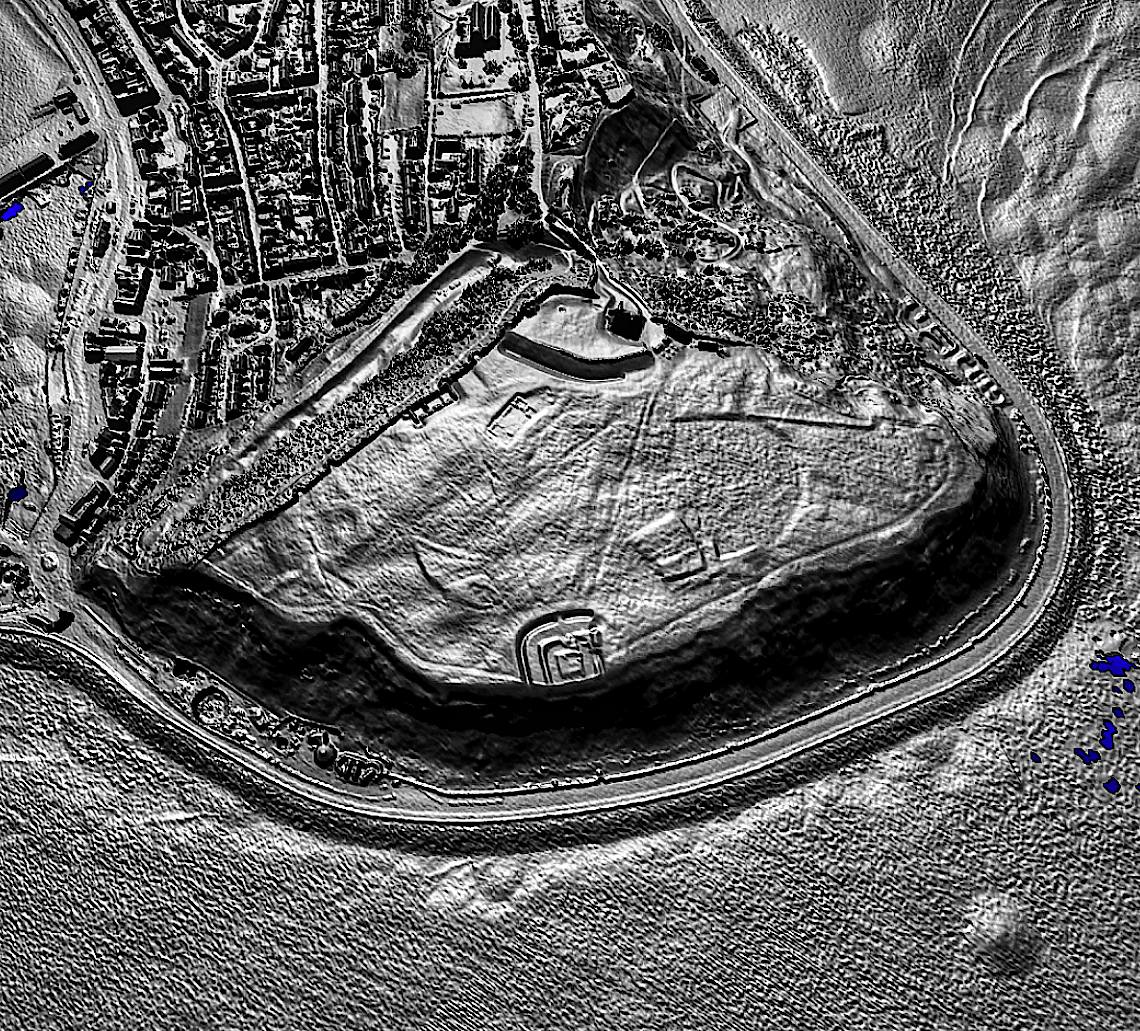
A lidar view of the site of the Iron Age settlement, Roman signal station, Anglo-Scandinavian settlement, chapel, enclosure castle and battery.

The Anglo-Saxons built a chapel on the station site around the year 1000, the remains of which are still visible. This is reputed to have been destroyed during the invasion of Harald Hardrada in 1066. A much later Icelandic poem claims that a Viking settlement around the harbour was burnt down in 1066 by Harald Hardrada's forces, who built a large bonfire on the headland to supply burning brands to hurl at the villagers below. However, there is no archaeological evidence of such an event, nor any of the Viking presence. The first evidence of the harbour settlement coincides with the establishment of the stone castle around 1157–1164. This grew from a small settlement around a wooden fortress which the stone castle replaced.

=== Development and decline ===
William le Gros, Count of Aumale, a powerful Anglo-Norman baron and grand-nephew of William the Conqueror, built a wooden fortification after his receipt of the Earldom of York, from King Stephen in 1138, granted as reward for his victory at the Battle of the Standard. Aumale may have re-founded the town of "Scardeburg", though there is little evidence of this. As with other castles, there would have been at least a small settlement nearby. Some information on the establishment of the castle has survived in the chronicle of William of Newburgh, a monk who in the 1190s wrote about its foundation. The castle had a gate tower, curtain wall, dry moat and chapel. This motte and bailey castle subsequently disappeared, with only the small, raised mound of the motte visible in the inner bailey today.

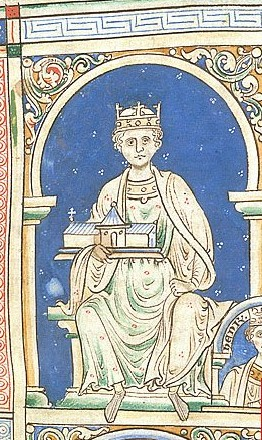
Henry II was responsible for much of the original stone buildings of the castle; he began the work in the 1150s, and it cost him £682.

The fate of the original fortifications is unclear. Henry II ordered that all royal castles be returned to the Crown. He had a policy of destroying adulterine castles, built without royal permission, during Stephen's chaotic reign. Initially, Aumale resisted the call to hand over Scarborough, which he had built on a royal manor, until Henry's forces arrived at York. The wooden castle vanished – William of Newburgh, writing near the time, claimed that the structure had decayed through age and the elements, battered beyond repair on the windswept headland. Later interpretations view this as implausible and argue that Henry wanted to stamp his mark on Scarborough, by demolishing William's fort and creating a much stronger stone complex.

From about 1157, Henry II rebuilt the castle using stone. Much of the building work occurred between 1159 and 1169, when the three-storey keep was built and a stone wall replaced the wooden palisade protecting the inner bailey. By the end of Henry's reign in 1189, a total of £682, 15 shillings and threepence had been spent on the castle, of which £532 was spent between 1157 and 1164. Henry's average annual income during his reign was about £10,000. The castle became a strategic northern stronghold for the Crown. Henry II granted the town that had grown up beneath the fortress, the title of Royal Borough.

While Richard I (reigned 1189–1199) had spent nothing on the castle, his brother King John (reigned 1199–1216) ensured that it was a comfortable residence for himself and his retinue. John's rule was strongly opposed by the northern barons, so the castle at Scarborough was fortified as a strategic stronghold. John visited the castle four times during his reign, and spent a considerable sum on the castle. He built the curtain wall on the west and south sides during 1202–1212, and a new hall called the "King's Chambers", later Mosdale Hall. In total, John spent £2,291, three shillings and fourpence on the castle. This included £780 that was earmarked for repairing the roof of the keep in 1211–1212; John spent more on the castle than any other monarch. The Pipe Rolls, records of royal expenditure, show that John spent over £17,000 on 95 castles during his reign spread, and Scarborough received the most investment.

Improvements continued under Henry III (reigned 1216–1272). By this time, Scarborough was a thriving port, and though he never visited the castle, Henry spent a considerable sum on its upkeep. Around 1240–1250, he installed a new barbican consisting of two towers flanking the gateway, with another two towers protecting the approach. These were completed in 1343, although have been much-modified since. At this time, the castle was a powerful base which an unscrupulous governor could abuse: Geoffrey de Neville, who was governor for 20 years in the 13th century, used the garrison to seize port goods. Since governors were not required to reside in the castle, they often pocketed funds rather than used them for repairs. By the mid-to-late 13th century, the defences were decaying, floorboards rotted, roof tiles were missing and armouries bare of weaponry. Corruption continued among the castle's custodians, who acted with impunity as the castle was outside the jurisdiction of the borough. In the 1270s, governor William de Percy blocked the main road into Scarborough and imposed illegal tolls.

Despite its decline, in 1265 the castle was committed to Prince Edward, later Edward I (reigned 1272–1307), who held court there in 1275 and 1280. In 1295, hostages from his campaigns to subjugate Wales were held at the castle.

=== Piers Gaveston besieged, 1312 ===
Henry de Percy, who occupied the castle from 1308, had a bakehouse, brewhouse and kitchens built in the inner bailey. and the castle was once again made into a major fortification. Edward II (reigned 1307–1327) imprisoned some of his Scottish enemies there in 1311. In 1312 he gave Isabella de Vesci the castles of Bamburgh and Scarborough. The castle was considered to be the natural place for the king's favourite knight, the Gascon Piers Gaveston, to seek sanctuary when pursued by the barons who had imposed the Ordinances of 1311. The Ordinances were imposed to curb the King's power, and the barons saw Gaveston as a threat to their interests. Sir Robert Felton was governor of Scarborough Castle in 1311 and was slain at Stirling in 1314. In April 1312, Edward made Gaveston the governor of Scarborough Castle, but his tenure would be brief. In May, Aymer de Valence, 2nd Earl of Pembroke and John de Warenne, 7th Earl of Surrey, together with Henry de Percy, besieged and took the castle. Despite its strong defences, it fell quickly due to lack of provisions. Gaveston was promised safe escort from the castle, but on the journey south was captured by Guy de Beauchamp, 10th Earl of Warwick and killed. Scarborough fared little better; Edward punished the town for not supporting Gaveston by revoking its royal privileges and placing it under the direct rule of appointed governors.

=== Further assaults and decay, 1318–1635 ===
At the time of the Hundred Years War (1337–1453), Scarborough was an important port for the wool trade, so was attacked several times by enemy forces. With rumours of a French invasion, a 1393 inquiry into the state of the castle led to repairs being carried out in 1396 and 1400. Henry VI (reigned 1422–1461; 1470–1471) ordered major repairs between 1424 and 1429. Richard III (reigned 1483–1485) was the last monarch to enter its grounds. He resided at the castle in 1484 while forming a fleet to fight Henry Tudor, a struggle he lost along with his life the following year.

After assaults by forces from France and Scotland in the early 16th century, in 1536 Robert Aske unsuccessfully tried to take the castle during the Pilgrimage of Grace, a revolt against the Dissolution of the Monasteries and Henry VIII's (reigned 1509–1547) break with the Roman Catholic Church. Repairs were made in 1537, and in 1538 some of the lead of the towers was used by the keeper, Sir Ralph Eure (Evers), to make a brewing vessel; Eure reported that some of the walls had fallen down. In 1557, forces loyal to Thomas Wyatt the younger, who opposed Mary I (reigned 1553–1558) and Catholicism, took the castle by entering disguised as peasants. Their leader, Thomas Stafford, held the castle for three days, and was subsequently executed for high treason on Tower Hill.

=== Civil War sieges, 1642–1648 ===
In September 1642, at the outbreak of the English Civil War (1642–1651), Sir Hugh Cholmley occupied the castle as a Parliamentarian loyal to Oliver Cromwell but swapped sides in March 1643. The castle was refortified on Cholmley's orders, including the establishment of the South Steel Battery for artillery. After Cholmeley's defection, the castle, with its garrison of 700 Royalist soldiers, the town and its strategic supply port were on the side of Charles I. (reigned 1625–1649) The Parliamentarians saw Scarborough as a valuable Royalist target because it was the only port not under their dominion.

On 18 February 1645, Sir John Meldrum took the town from the Royalists, cutting off any escape routes by land or sea and delivering the port for Parliament. The same day, Cholmley retreated into the castle and refused to give in, so the Parliamentarians prepared for what would be a five-month siege – one of the most bloody of the Civil War, with almost continuous fighting. The Parliamentary forces set up what was then the largest cannon in the country, the Cannon Royal, in the 12th-century St Mary's Church below the castle, and proceeded to fire 56–65 pounds (25–29 kg) cannonballs that pounded the castle's defences. In turn, the church was extensively damaged over the three days of fighting. The bombardment partially destroyed the castle keep, but the outer walls were not breached. The Parliamentary forces were unable to take the castle and there followed a period of particularly bloody hand-to-hand fighting around the barbican gateway in which Sir John Meldrum was killed.

By July the tide was turning in the Parliamentarians' favour: bombardment, scurvy, lack of water, perhaps a shortage of gunpowder and the threat of starvation and only 25 men fit to fight meant that the castle surrendered on 25 July 1645. Only about half of the original 500 defenders emerged alive. Subsequently the castle was repaired and rearmed for Parliament with a company of 160. Matthew Boynton, the castle's new governor, declared for the King on 27 July 1648 when the soldiers went unpaid. This led to a second siege which brought the castle back under Parliamentary control on 19 December, when the garrison was defeated as much by the oncoming winter as by the Parliamentary forces. The castle changed hands seven times between 1642 and 1648. The castle was later used as a prison for those who were deemed to be enemies of the Commonwealth of England, the country's brief period of republicanism; the shell of the keep survives, minus the west wall, which was destroyed in the bombardment. The castle was returned to the Crown following the restoration of the monarchy in 1660.

=== From 1660 ===
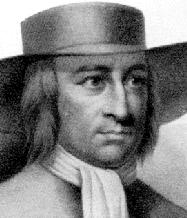
George Fox, who founded the Quakers, was imprisoned in Scarborough Castle in the 17th century.

The castle was used as a prison from the 1650s, and the garrison increased in 1658, and in 1662 it returned to the Crown. George Fox (1624–1691), founder of the Religious Society of Friends was imprisoned there from April 1665 to September 1666 for religious activities viewed as troublesome for Charles II (reigned 1660–1685). The castle declined again: James II (reigned 1685–1688) did not garrison it, he gambled that its defences would be sufficient to resist any Dutch invasion, but the town was seized for William of Orange during the Glorious Revolution that ousted James.

The Jacobite Rebellion of 1745, a series of uprising aimed at restoring the Catholic House of Stuart to the throne, saw the castle refortified with gun batteries and barracks for 120 officers and men by 1746. The keep was used as a powder magazine, storing gunpowder, and the South Steel Battery was rebuilt. A barracks, containing twelve apartments accommodated 120 soldiers. Three batteries were built to protect the town and harbour. Two faced south and the other was on the north side of the castle yard. In 1748, the Master Gunner's house was constructed and served as accommodation until the early 20th century and today hosts the exhibition on the castle. The castle saw no action during this time. Later still, the threat of French invasion during the Napoleonic Wars led to the permanent establishment of a garrison, which remained until the mid-19th century; French prisoners were held at the castle during 1796.

During the First World War, Scarborough was used for British propaganda purposes after the bombardment of the town by two warships of the German Empire, SMS Derfflinger and SMS Von der Tann, on 16 December 1914. The raid killed 19 people and damaged the castle's keep, barracks and curtain walls. The castle was severely damaged by the hail of 500 shells directed at it and the town. The barracks were demolished due to the extensive damage wrought by the bombardment. In the Second World War, the castle served as a secret listening post. A Royal Observer Corps observation post was added to the headland during the Cold War, which relayed information to York Cold War Bunker and remained in operation until 1968.

== Features ==
The 12th-century keep

The castle's location takes advantage of a naturally defensive site on a headland with steep cliffs, 300 feet (91 m) high, on three seaward sides. The promontory is joined to the mainland by an isthmus, where a ditch or moat was cut, and a wall or palisade with a gatehouse built on the southwest landward side. The stone curtain wall dates from the late 12th and early 13th centuries when it was strengthened by the addition of twelve round towers at intervals on its 230 yards (210 m) length. The wall does not surround the inner buildings of the castle. The entrance consists of a barbican, or fortifications to protect the gateway, completed in the 14th century and flanked by two half-circular towers on high ground. Modifications to the barbican have removed evidence of a portcullis and its grooves. The barbican stands in the place of a 12th-century fortification built close to the remains of an 11th-century Anglo-Saxon chapel.

Main gateway

Beyond the main gateway, a stone bridge, built between 1337 and 1338, to replace two drawbridges, leads to the baileys or courtyards. It leads to the inner bailey, which was used for workshops, offices, a kitchen, and a storage area. Usually a castle's inner bailey is accessed through the outer bailey. However, the opposite is the case at Scarborough.

The 86-foot-tall (26 m) 12th-century keep and the castle's 150-foot-deep (46 m) well lie within the inner bailey. The keep, with its entrance on the first floor, survives as a shell, with the west wall, interior floors and roof missing, as a result of bombardment in the 17th century. With its sloping plinth to aid defence, flat roof and four turrets, this square four-storey building was over 100-foot-tall (30 m). The walls range from 11 to 15 feet (3.4 to 4.6 m) in thickness, the west wall being strongest, and there are several windows, some blocked up along its length. The corners have decorative rounded mouldings. There are the remains of a hearth in the west wall on the first floor, which comprised a single Great Hall, where the occupants ate and often slept. The second and third floors were each divided into two rooms for important visitors or the governor, and the basement was a storage area. Late 20th-century resistivity surveys of the inner bailey have traced the outlines of more 12th-century buildings.

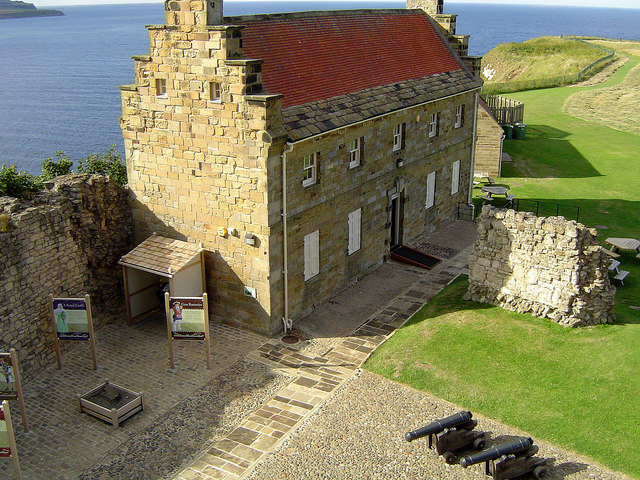
The Master Gunner’s House

The baileys are separated by a stone wall, ditch and bank, with two defended gateways. The larger outer bailey would have seen entertaining events staged, vegetables grown, and animals kept; there was a graveyard and St Mary's Chapel, which has completely disappeared, though the remains of the old Anglo-Saxon chapel on the site of an old Roman signal station can still be seen. A 12th-century medieval building, 100 feet (30 m) in length, stood in the outer bailey to accommodate royal visitors. It consisted of a long hall and private chamber with a fireplace used by the monarch, and rooms for preparing and storing food. The building was demolished sometime before a survey of 1538, which makes no mention of it: only the foundations, excavated in 1888, remain.

In the outer bailey, a building named the "King's Chambers" or Mosdale Hall, after a 14th-century governor responsible for upgrading it, is an example of how the castle has been altered over the years. Originally built in the 13th century and upgraded by Mosdale after 1397, the two-storey building adjoining the curtain wall was converted to red-brick barracks in the 18th century. After being badly damaged by German shelling in 1914, the building was demolished. The red brickwork is clearly visible next to the much earlier outer stone wall, as viewed from Scarborough's South Bay. The 13th-century Queen's Tower, in the wall nearby, also had different uses: initially luxurious accommodation with private latrines, a porch and large windows with bay views were added in 1320. Two of these windows were later blocked up and one was changed to a cupboard with a rubbish chute. The Master Gunner's House, built in 1748, served as accommodation until the last on site caretaker, Hudson Rewcroft, retired in 1965. His nephew, Ted Temple shares his story of being the last resident of The Master Gunner's House in the Scarborough Review of June 2017, page 12.

=== Development as a tourist attraction ===
During the second half of the 19th century the castle became a tourist attraction. The foundations of a medieval hall were excavated in 1888, and an 1890 photograph shows visitors using the grounds to practice archery. By 1920, the site was taken into public ownership by the Ministry of Works. The demolition of the 18th-century barracks exposed the medieval foundations of Mosdale Hall, which can still be seen.

Scarborough Castle dominates the promontory overlooking the town

The castle site, a scheduled ancient monument managed by English Heritage since 1984, is host to various events, usually in summertime, such as pirate and Robin Hood-themed activities and an annual Kite Festival. The castle grounds are reputed to be haunted – by three ghosts, among them a Roman soldier. The 18th-century Master Gunner's House, now a museum, has an exhibition whose centrepiece is a Bronze Age sword discovered in 1980. English Heritage invested £250,000 in making the site a tourist attraction. A visitor centre provides admission to all extant remains, and has an exhibition of artefacts from the site and viewing platforms.

== Notable Governors ==
- 1270–: Geoffrey de Neville
- 1311–: Sir Robert de Felton (killed at Battle of Bannockburn, 1314)
- 1312: Piers Gaveston, 1st Earl of Cornwall (assassinated, 1312)
- 1312–: Isabella de Beaumont (died 1334)
- 1322–: Henry de Percy, 2nd Baron Percy
- 1537–: Sir Ralph Eure (died 1545)
- 1644–1645: Sir Hugh Cholmeley (Royalist)
- 1645–: Sir Matthew Boynton (died 1647) (Parliamentarian)
- 1648–: Colonel Matthew Boynton (Parliamentarian turned Royalist) (killed Wigan, 1651)
- c. 1729: William Thomson
- c. 1791: Hugh Palliser
- 1796–: Henry Phipps, 1st Earl of Mulgrave

== See also ==
- Castles in Great Britain and Ireland
- List of castles in England
