= Richard Molyneux, 2nd Viscount Molyneux =

Richard Molyneux, 2nd Viscount Molyneux of Maryborough, (about 1620–1654) was a Royalist officer in the English Civil War

== Biography ==
Richard Molyneux was the son of Richard Molyneux, 1st Viscount Molyneux and Mary, daughter of Sir Thomas Caryll of Bentone, Sussex. He was born around 1620 and he inherited his title on his father's death in 1636. He married Lady Frances Seymour, but they had no children.

On 20 June 1642, Molyneux attended the commission of array on Preston Moor, and assisted in the seizure of the magazine at Preston. On the outbreak of the Civil War, he raised two regiments, one of horse and the other of foot, composed chiefly of Roman Catholics, for the service of the king, forming part of the Lancashire forces under the command of James Stanley, 7th Earl of Derby.

Molyneux was present at the siege of Manchester in September 1642, and on 20 April 1643 was defeated by Captain Ashton at Whalley. After the surprise capture of Wakefield on 21 May 1643, the Earl of Derby being then with Queen Henrietta Maria at York, Molyneux was ordered to conduct the Lancashire forces thither. He was defeated on 20 August 1644 by Major-general Sir John Meldrum at the battle of Ormskirk, and narrowly escaped capture by hiding in a field of corn. He was at Oxford on 24 June 1646, when the city surrendered to the Parliament. On 30 June 1648, a warrant was signed by the Derby House Committee for his arrest, as having, contrary to an ordinance of Parliament, approached within twenty miles of London. He was suspected of being concerned in the rising of the royalist gentry at Kingston on 5 July, but four days later an order was issued for his discharge.

Molyneux joined Charles II on his march to Worcester, and escaped after the battle on 3 September 1651, but died shortly afterwards, probably in 1654. He was succeeded by his brother, Caryll Molyneux, 3rd Viscount Molyneux (1621–1699), who played an active part during the Civil War on the Royalist side.

== Family ==
Molyneux married Frances, eldest daughter of William, Marquis of Hertford, and had no children.

== Notes ==
Peerage of Ireland
Preceded by Richard Molyneux	Viscount Molyneux; 1636–1654	Succeeded by Caryll Molyneux
