= Great Siege =

Great Siege may refer to:

- Great Siege of Gibraltar, 1779–1783, an unsuccessful attempt by Spain and France to capture Gibraltar from Britain
- Great Siege of Malta, 1565, an unsuccessful attempt by the Ottoman Empire to capture Malta from the Order of Saint John
- Great Siege of Montevideo, 1843–1851, during the Uruguayan Civil War
- Great Siege of Scarborough Castle, 1645, during the English Civil War
