= Listed buildings in Aughton, Lancashire =

Aughton is a civil parish in the West Lancashire district of Lancashire, England. It contains 15 buildings that are recorded in the National Heritage List for England as designated listed buildings. Of these, one is listed at Grade I, the highest of the three grades, one is at Grade II*, the middle grade, and the others are at Grade II, the lowest grade. The parish is partly residential, and partly rural. The listed buildings consist of churches, houses, farmhouses and farm buildings, two cross bases, boundary stones, and a war memorial.

== Key ==
Grade	Criteria
I	Buildings of exceptional interest, sometimes considered to be internationally important
II*	Particularly important buildings of more than special interest
II	Buildings of national importance and special interest

== Buildings ==
Name and location	Photograph	Date	Notes	Grade
Cross base 53.54179°N 2.91950°W	—	Medieval	The cross base is in the churchyard of St Michael's Church. It is in sandstone and has a square plan with a square socket.	II
Cross base 53.54587°N 2.92024°W	—	Medieval	This is a large square block of sandstone with a rectangular socket set diagonally.	II
St Michael's Church; 53.54186°N 2.91976°W		14th century	The church contains some fabric from earlier dates, including a Norman doorway, now blocked. Alterations were made in the 15th century and the north aisle was added in the mid-16th century. The church was restored in 1876 when the chancel was rebuilt. The church is built in sandstone with a stone-slate roof, and consists of a nave with a south porch, a north aisle, a chancel with a north chapel and a north vestry, and a steeple between the aisle and the chapel. The steeple has a tower with a square base that broaches to an octagonal bell stage which is surmounted by a spire.	I
Aughton Old Hall; 53.54294°N 2.91995°W	—	Early 16th century	The house was extended in the 18th century. It is built partly in brick and partly in sandstone with some timber-framing. The house has two storeys, and it consists of a three-bay main range and a one-bay cross wing to the left. There is one mullioned window, the other windows being later horizontal sliding sashes and casements. Inside the house are two massive back-to-back stone fireplaces.	II
Moor Hall; 53.54161°N 2.88967°W	—	1566	The house was later extended. It is in brick and sandstone with some timber-framing and with a slate roof. The original part has an H-shaped plan, with a two-bay main range and two cross wings. In the left bay is a two-storey canted bay window. The right bay contains a two-storey gabled porch with a Tudor arched doorway, above which is an inscribed tablet. Some of the windows are mullioned and others are sashes. To the right of the main part is a one-bay link to a kitchen wing in brick encasing timber-framing and with casement windows.	II*
Barn, Home Farm; 53.53473°N 2.93190°W	—	1704	The barn is in brick on a sandstone plinth and has a roof of corrugated asbestos sheet. It contains ventilation slits, in the south wall is a wide entrance, and in the east gabled wall is a pitching hole, above which is an inscribed plaque.	II
Moss End Farmhouse; 53.54575°N 2.87902°W	—	Mid 18th century	A brick house with sandstone dressings, including chamfered quoins, and a slate roof. It has two storeys and four bays, and the windows are sashes.	II
Aughton House; 53.53216°N 2.92493°W	—	1805	The house is in roughcast brick with a slate roof, in two storeys and two bays. The windows are sashes with stone lintels and sills. The central door has a stone surround, a round head, impost blocks, a keystone, and a fanlight. Above the door is an inscribed plaque.	II
St Mary's Church and presbytery 53.52696°N 2.89776°W		1823	The Roman Catholic church and presbytery are at right angles to each other, the church is stuccoed, the presbytery has exposed brick, and both have slate roofs. The south wall of the church has three tall round-headed windows, the west gabled wall has a small lozenge window and a gabled porch, and in the north wall is a small round chancel window. On the gables and porch are cross finials. Inside the church is a west gallery. The presbytery has two storeys and three bays. Its doorway has a plain surround and a round head, and the windows are sashes.	II
Holt Green House; 53.53756°N 2.91829°W		Early 19th century	A brick house with a slate roof in two storeys and with three bays. The central doorway has Tuscan pilasters, a broken fluted frieze, and a fanlight rising to be partly in an open pediment. The windows are sashes.	II
Pair of boundary stones 53.54717°N 2.87976°W	—	Early 19th century (probable)	The boundary stones are in sandstone and each has a triangular plan. They are both inscribed 'Aughton' and 'Bickerstaffe'.	II
Boundary stone 53.54650°N 2.87810°W	—	Mid 19th century	The boundary stone is in sandstone with a triangular plan and a sloping top. It is inscribed 'Aughton' and 'Bickerstaffe'.	II
Gerard Hall Farmhouse; 53.52683°N 2.90164°W	—	Mid 19th century (probable)	The house is in pebbledashed brick with dressings in sandstone and artificial stone, including a plinth and chamfered quoins, and it has a slate roof. The house has two storeys, with a main part of three bays, and a lower extension of one bay. The windows have architraves and decorated keystones, and most contain sashes. The doorway has a plain surround and a cornice on decorated brackets.	II
Christ Church; 53.55855°N 2.90458°W		1867–71	The church was designed by W. and J. Hay in Decorated style. It is in sandstone with a slate roof, and consists of a nave, aisles, a south porch, a chancel with a north organ chamber and a north vestry, and a west tower. The tower has angle buttresses, a west doorway, a west window, and a pierced parapet with crocketed angle pinnacles. At the southeast is a stair turret with a conical roof rising to a higher level.	II
War memorial 53.54377°N 2.90492°W		1922	The war memorial is in white granite and is 6.5 metres (21 ft) high. It consists of a plinth on a base of two steps surmounted by an obelisk. On the sides of the plinth are bronze plaques with the names of these killed in both World Wars.	II
