= St Michael's Church, Aughton =

Coordinates: 53.5419°N 2.9198°W

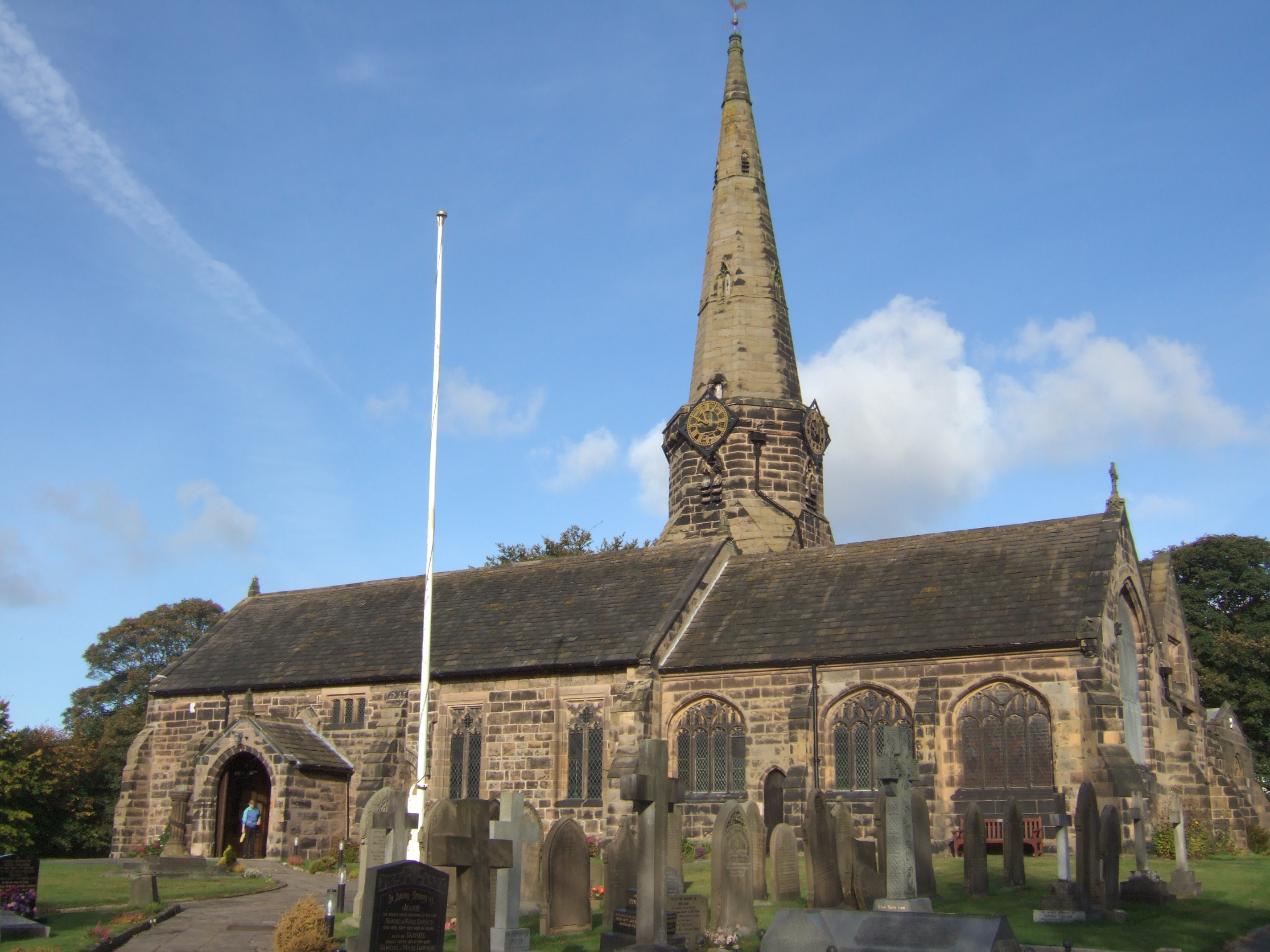
- St Michael's Church, Aughton, from the south

- Location in West Lancashire
- OS grid reference: SD 392 054
- Location: Church Lane, Aughton, Lancashire
- Country: England
- Denomination: Anglican
- Churchmanship: Broad/Central
- Website: St Michael, Aughton

History
- Status: Parish church

Architecture
- Functional status: Active
- Heritage designation: Grade I
- Designated: 11 October 1968
- Architect(s): W. and J. Hey (restoration)
- Architectural type: Church
- Style: Norman, Gothic, Gothic Revival

Specifications
- Materials: Sandstone, stone slate roofs

Administration
- Province: York
- Diocese: Liverpool
- Archdeaconry: Warrington
- Deanery: Ormskirk
- Parish: St Michael, Aughton

Clergy
- Rector: Revd Capt Andrew Housley CA

St Michael's Church is in Church Lane, Aughton, Lancashire, England. It is an active Anglican parish church in the deanery of Ormskirk, the archdeaconry of Wigan & West Lancashire, and the diocese of Liverpool. Its benefice is united with that of Holy Trinity, Bickerstaffe. The church is recorded in the National Heritage List for England as a designated Grade I listed building.

== History ==
The oldest fabric in the church is a blocked Norman doorway, and an adjacent section of the wall. The nave and steeple date from the 14th century, and a chancel was present in the 15th century. In about 1545–48 the north aisle was rebuilt, replacing an earlier, narrower aisle. The church was restored in 1876 by W. and J. Hey, during which the chancel and the west windows of the nave and aisle were rebuilt. There was a further restoration in 1913–14 when the north vestry was enlarged.

== Architecture ==
=== Exterior ===
The church is constructed in local grey-brown sandstone, with stone slate roofs. Its plan consists of a nave with a south porch, a north aisle of similar width to the nave, a chancel with a north chapel and a vestry to the north of that, and a steeple in the east angle between the nave and the aisle. The tower broaches to an octagonal bell stage, and this is surmounted by a spire. The window at the west end of the nave and of the aisle each has four lights. In the south wall of the nave are three two-light windows and one window with three lights. To the east of the porch is a blocked Norman doorway, which is partly hidden by a buttress. There are three three-light windows in the south wall of the chancel, and at the east end of the chancel is a five-light window. The east end of the chapel contains a three-light window, with another three-light window above it. Along the wall of the aisle are four three-light windows, and there is a two-light window on the north side of the tower.

=== Interior ===
Inside the church is a four-bay arcade, beyond which is the tower arch. In a recess in the north wall of the chancel is a 19th-century chest tomb. The chancel roof is supported by corbels carved with angels. The octagonal font is in Decorated style. In a recess in the north wall of the church is part of an Anglo-Saxon cross-head, which has been dated to about 850. Under the tower is a medieval graveslab. A window on the north side of the church contains fragments of medieval glass. There is a ring of six bells; four of these were cast in 1715 by Abraham Rudhall I, and the other two in 1935 by Gillett and Johnston.

== External features ==
In the churchyard, to the south of the church, is the sandstone base of a medieval cross, consisting of a square base containing a square socket. The churchyard contains war graves of a Royal Army Medical Corps officer of World War I, and two airmen and an officer and sergeant of the Royal Artillery of World War II.

== See also ==
- Grade I listed buildings in Lancashire
- Grade I listed churches in Lancashire
- Listed buildings in Aughton, Lancashire
