= Frances Darcy, Countess of Holderness =

English noblewoman

- Born: 1618
- Died: January 1681 (aged 62–63)
- Spouse(s): Richard Molyneux (d. 1654) Thomas Wriothesley (m. 1659; died 1667) Conyers Darcy (m. 1676)
- Parents: William Seymour (father); Frances Devereux (mother)
- Relatives: Henry Seymour (brother); John Seymour (brother); Edward Seymour (grandfather); Robert Devereux (grandfather); Frances Walsingham (grandmother)

Frances Darcy, Countess of Southampton (1618 – January 1681), formerly Lady Frances Seymour, was an English noblewoman of royal descent, who was married three times to titled men.

== Biography ==
She was the daughter of William Seymour, 2nd Duke of Somerset, by his second marriage to Lady Frances Devereux; the duke was directly descended from King Henry VII of England.

Frances married Richard Molyneux, 2nd Viscount Molyneux, who, like her father, was a Royalist commander in the English Civil War. They had no children, and Molyneux died in about 1654.

As her second husband, she married (as his third wife) Thomas Wriothesley, 4th Earl of Southampton, on 7 May 1659. They had no children, and Wriothesley died in 1667, leaving Frances the contents of Southampton House in Holborn, their London home.

Thirdly (as his third wife) she married, in 1676, Conyers Darcy, 2nd Earl of Holderness, by whom she had no children.

She died childless at the age of about 62, and was buried at Westminster Abbey on 5 January 1681.
