= Town Green railway station =

Railway station in Lancashire, England

Town Green
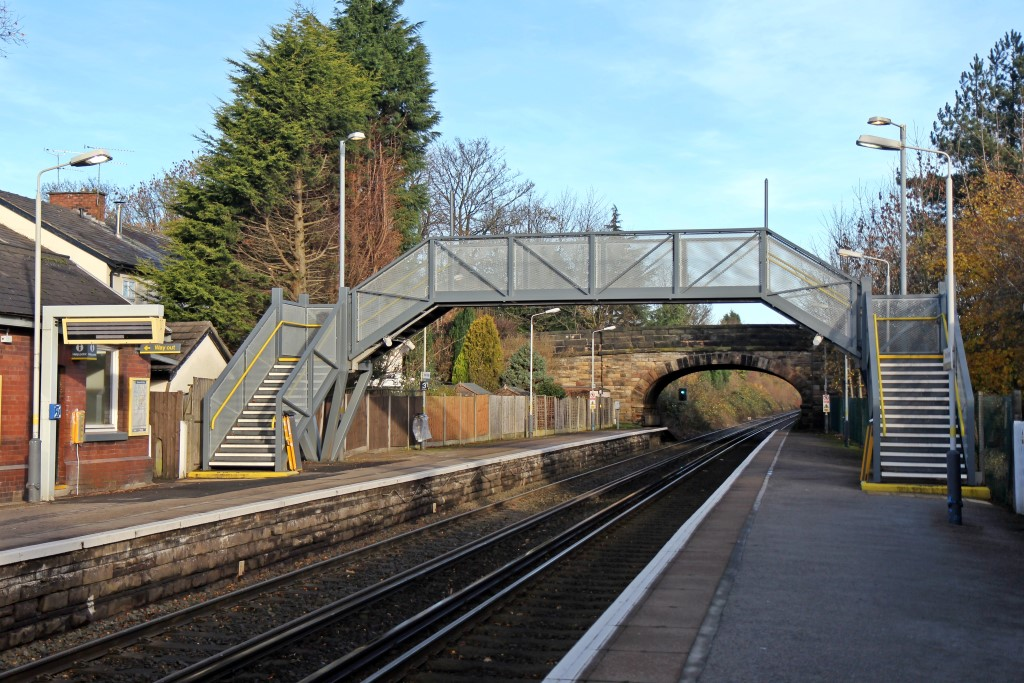

General information
- Location: Aughton, West Lancashire; England
- Coordinates: 53.5430°N 2.9044°W
- Grid reference: SD401055
- Manager: Merseyrail
- Transit authority: Merseytravel
- Platforms: 2

Other information
- Station code: TWN
- Fare zone: F
- Classification: DfT category E

History
- Original company: Liverpool, Ormskirk and Preston Railway
- Pre-grouping: Lancashire and Yorkshire Railway
- Post-grouping: London Midland and Scottish Railway

Key dates
- 2 April 1849: Opened as Town Green
- 1 June 1889: Renamed Town Green and Aughton
- 5 May 1975: Renamed Town Green

Passengers
- 2021/22: ▲0.290 million
- 2022/23: ▲0.361 million
- 2023/24: ▲0.405 million
- 2024/25: ▲0.410 million
- 2025/26: ▲0.479 million
Location
Notes
- Passenger statistics from the Office of Rail and Road

Town Green railway station is a railway station in Town Green, Aughton, Lancashire, England, situated on the Ormskirk branch of Merseyrail's Northern Line.

== Location ==
It is located at the junction of Town Green Lane and Middlewood Road with pedestrian and vehicular access from Middlewood Road. The booking hall opens onto the south bound platform and the Aughton police station now occupies rooms opening off the booking hall.

== Facilities ==
The station is staffed throughout the day, with the ticket office open from start of service until 00:20. There is a waiting room in the main building and a shelter on the opposite side, with a footbridge linking them. Digital display screens, timetable posters and automatic announcements are used to convey train running information. There is step-free access to both platforms.

== Services ==
Trains operate every 15 minutes (Monday to Saturday daytime) between Ormskirk and Liverpool Central, and every 30 minutes in the evening and all day Sunday.

== History ==
Town Green station was regularly used as an overnight base for the royal trains when the royal family were visiting Knowsley Hall, the home of Lord Derby, or attending the Grand National race meeting at Aintree. see Royal Trains List (p19/204) . To the Liverpool end of Town Green station on the Ormskirk bound side and behind the signal box there used to be a small loop line with a very low white painted station which was the platform used by the train. This now forms the car park of the Aughton Institute.

The signal box (erected by British Railways in 1949 to replace an earlier Lancashire and Yorkshire Railway structure dating from 1875) was closed and demolished when the line was resignalled in February 1994. From October 1970 until its demise, it remotely operated the points and signalling at Ormskirk as well as at this station.

== Gallery ==
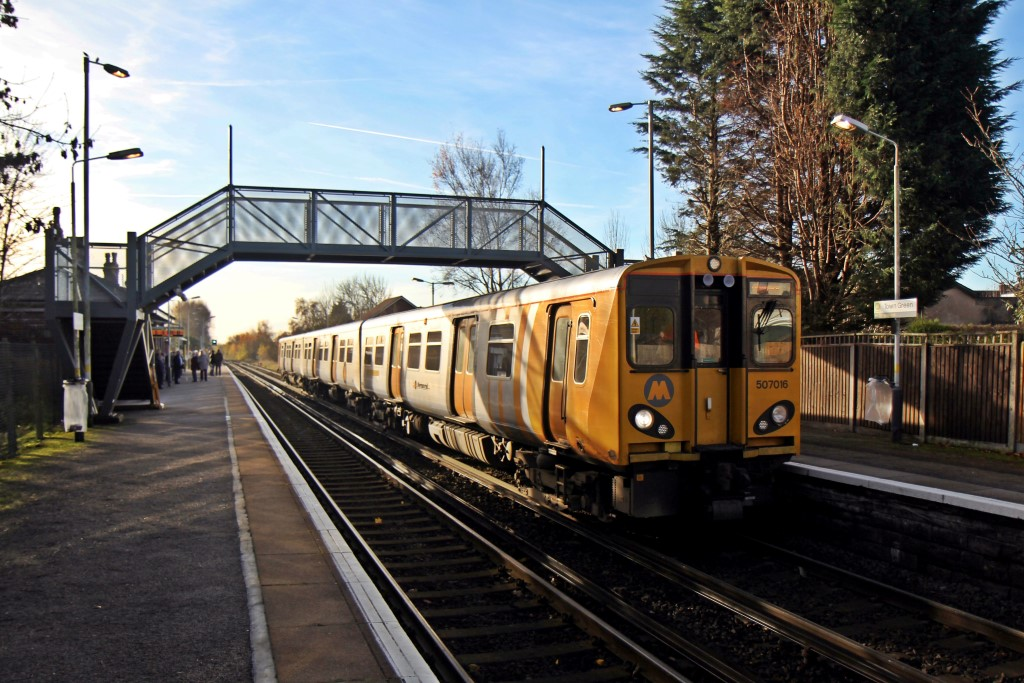
A Merseyrail Class 507 waits at the Ormskirk-bound platform.

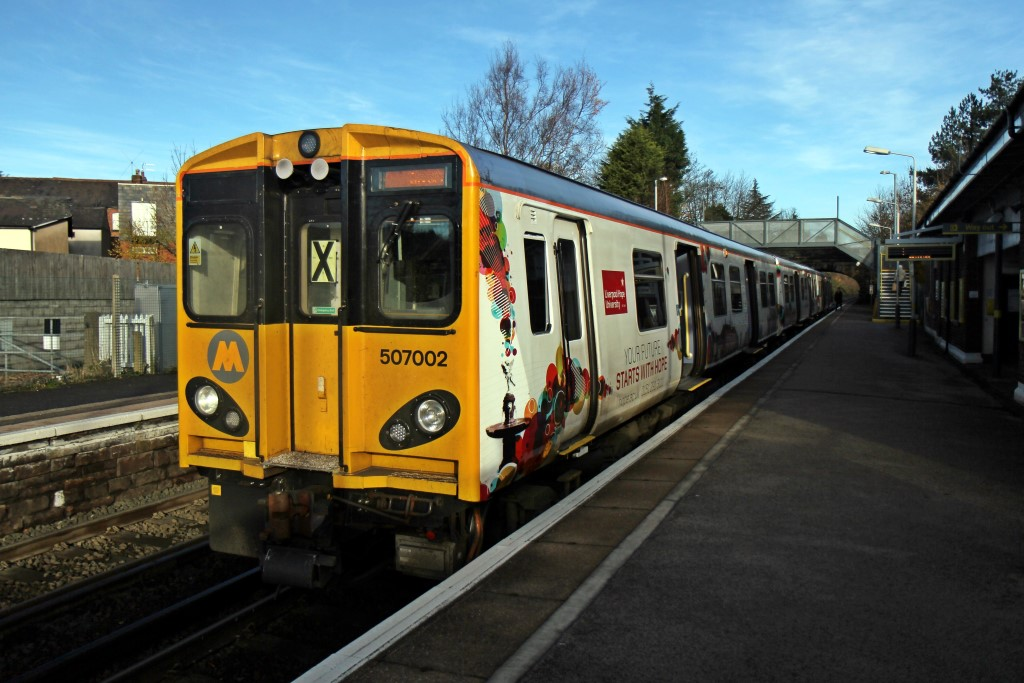
A Merseyrail Class 507 waits at the Liverpool-bound platform.

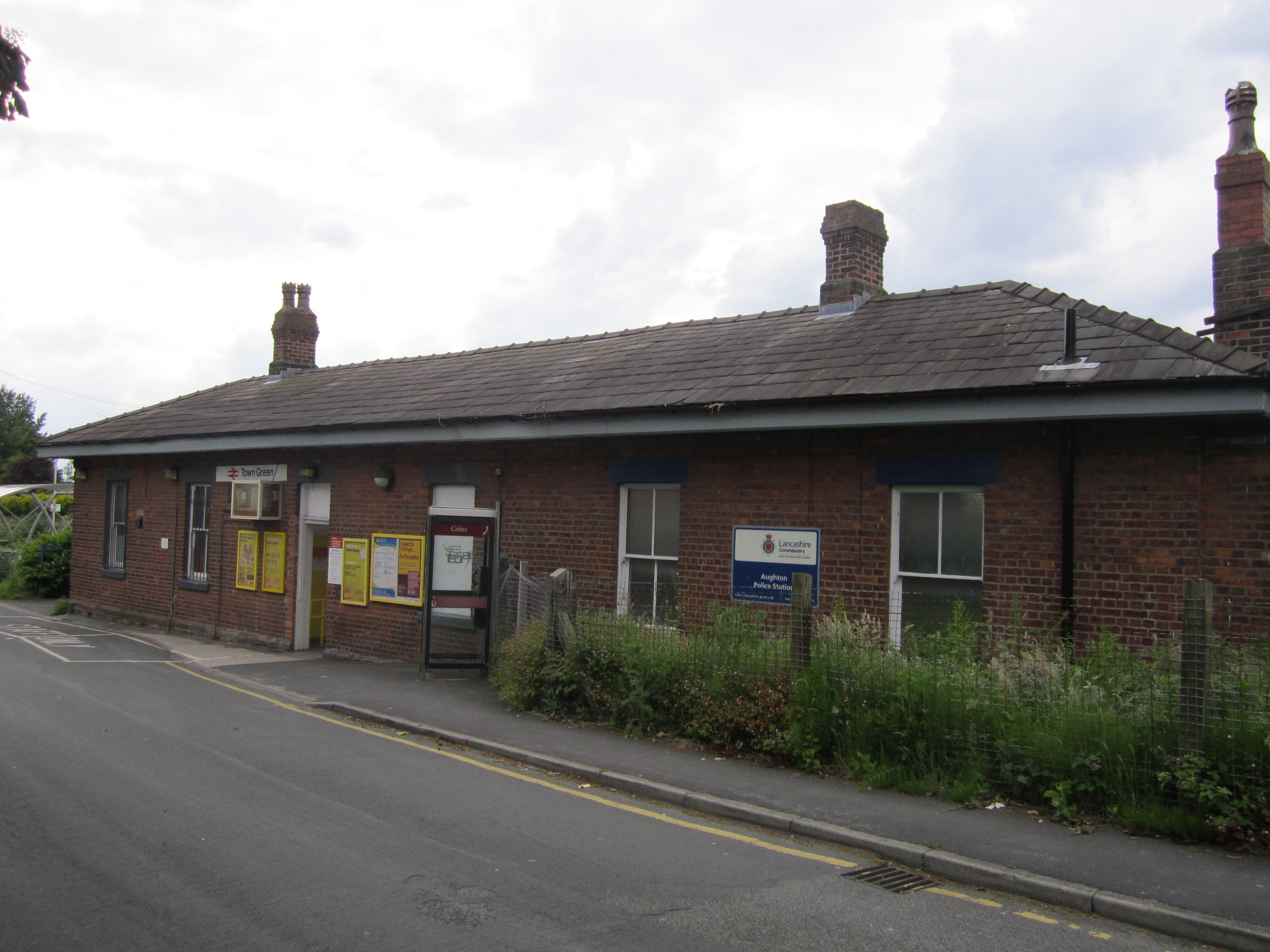
The station as viewed from the roadside drop-off point.

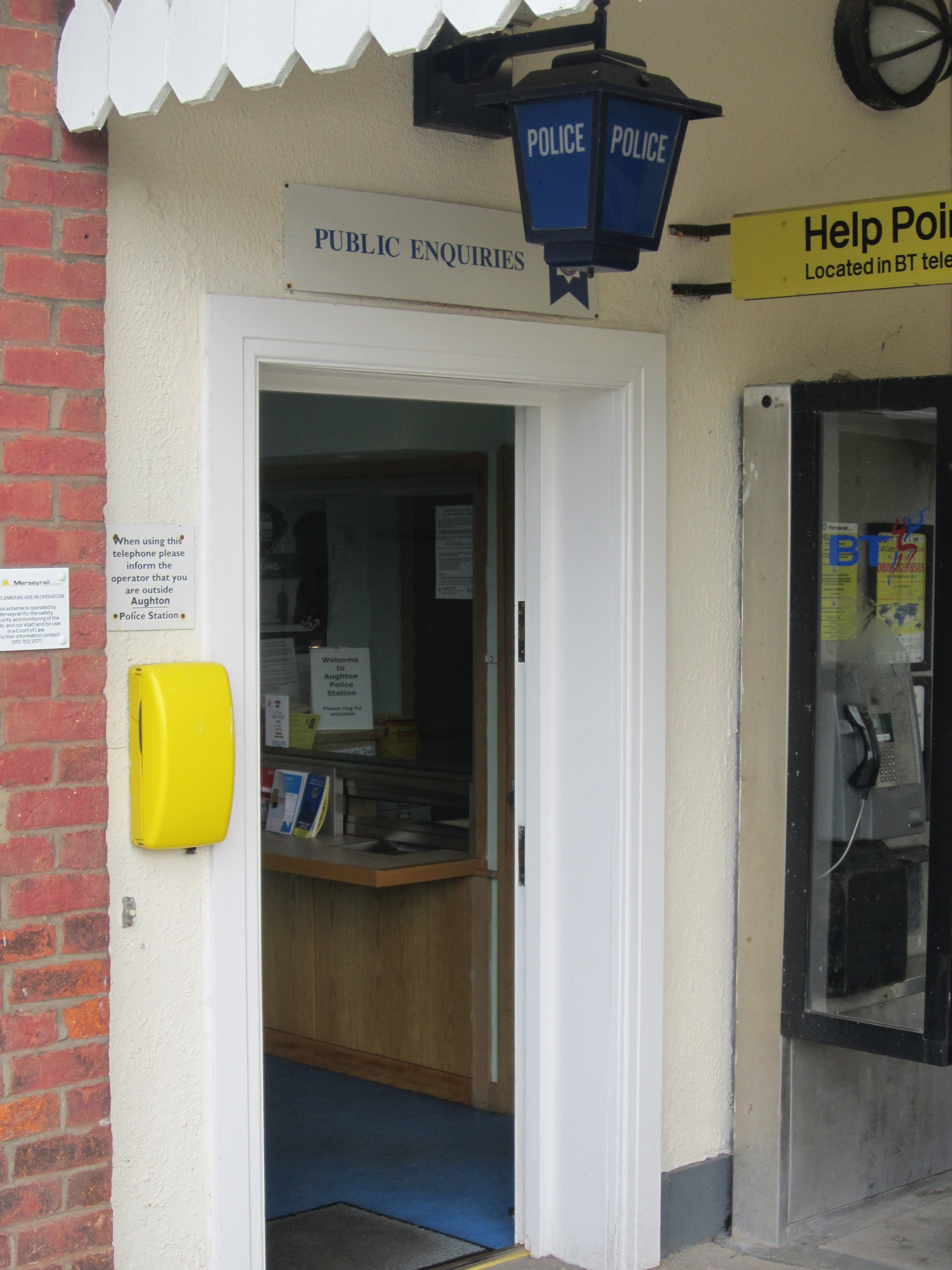
Aughton police station, on the Liverpool-bound platform.

Preceding station	National Rail	Following station
Aughton Park towards Ormskirk	Merseyrail; Northern Line	Maghull North towards Liverpool Central
