= Barbara Hammond (equestrian) =

British equestrian

Personal information
- Nationality: British
- Born: 26 July 1943; Aughton, England
- Died: 9 November 2009 (aged 66)

Sport
- Sport: Equestrian

Barbara Hammond (26 July 1943 – 9 November 2009) was a British equestrian. She competed in two events at the 1988 Summer Olympics.
