= Aughton Park railway station =

Railway station in Lancashire, England

Aughton Park
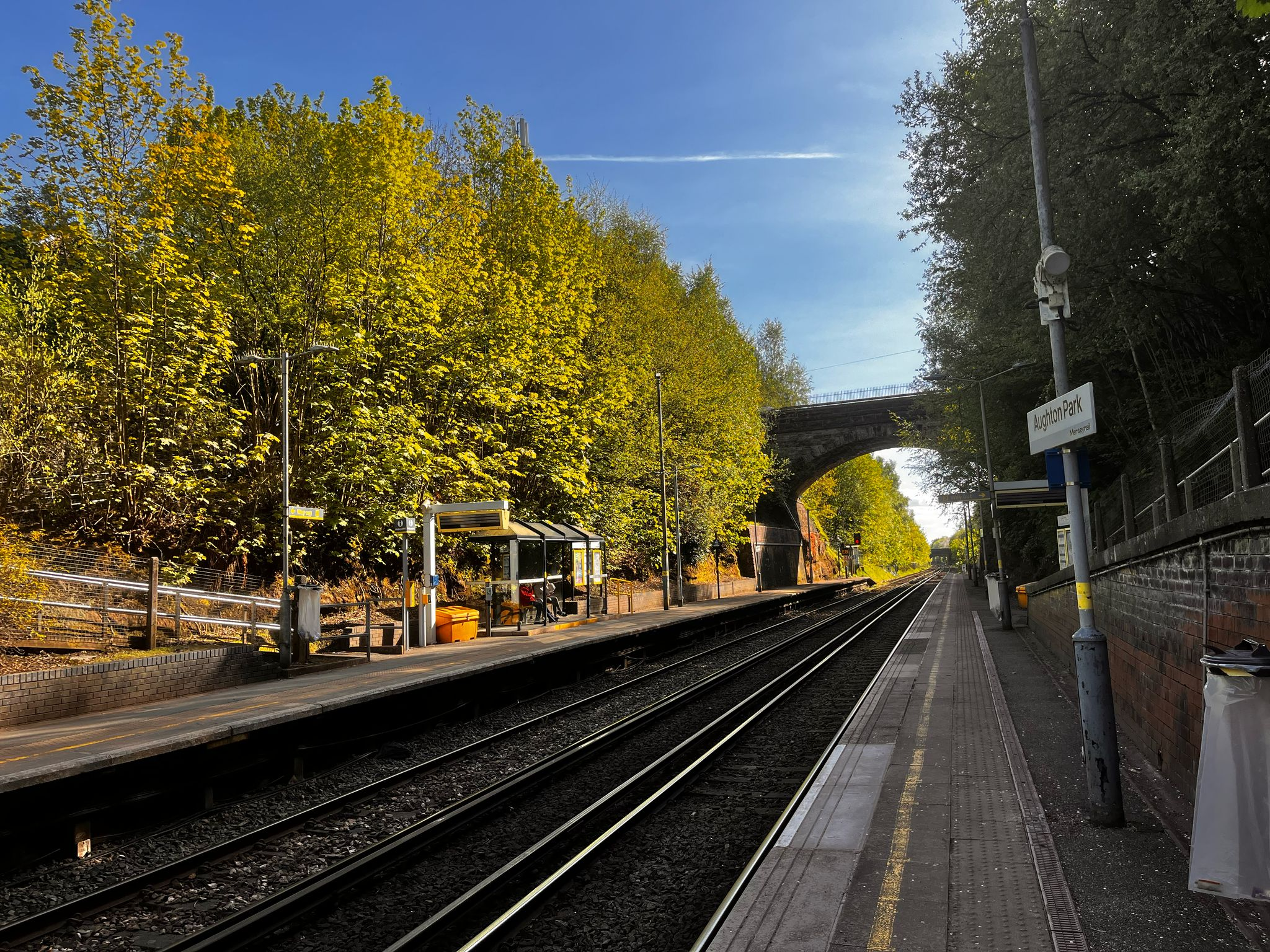
- The station in 2025

General information
- Location: Aughton, West Lancashire; England
- Coordinates: 53.5542°N 2.8953°W
- Grid reference: SD408067
- Manager: Merseyrail
- Transit authority: Merseytravel
- Platforms: 2

Other information
- Station code: AUG
- Fare zone: F
- Classification: DfT category E

Key dates
- 1907: Opened

Passengers
- 2021/22: ▲0.112 million
- 2022/23: ▲0.140 million
- 2023/24: ▲0.162 million
- 2024/25: ▲0.186 million
- 2025/26: ▲0.198 million
Location
Notes
- Passenger statistics from the Office of Rail and Road

Aughton Park railway station is a railway station in Aughton Park, Lancashire, England. It is on the Ormskirk branch of the Northern Line of the Merseyrail network, 11½ miles (19 km) north east of Liverpool Central.

== History ==
The station is below ground level built into a cutting. Opened by the Lancashire and Yorkshire Railway, Aughton Park Station was originally coupled with a freight siding, Crook's Sand Siding, which serviced two nearby quarries. The station became part of the London, Midland and Scottish Railway during the Grouping of 1923. The line then passed on to the London Midland Region of British Railways on nationalisation in 1948.

When sectorisation was introduced, the station was served by Regional Railways on behalf of the Merseyside PTE until the privatisation of British Railways.

During the 2020/21 and 2021/22 periods, Aughton Park was the least used station on the Merseyrail Network.

== Facilities ==
The station is staffed throughout the day (like all Merseytravel stations), with the ticket office open from start of service until the last train has called throughout the week. There are shelters on both platforms and a pay phone on platform 1. Train running information is provided by automated announcements and digital display screens. No step-free access to either platform is available.

== Services ==
Trains operate every 15 minutes on Monday to Saturday daytimes between Ormskirk and Hunts Cross via Liverpool Central, and every 30 minutes at other times (evenings and Sundays).

Preceding station	National Rail	Following station
Ormskirk; Terminus	Merseyrail; Northern Line	Town Green towards Liverpool Central

== Bibliography ==
- Butt, R. V. J. (October 1995). The Directory of Railway Stations: details every public and private passenger station, halt, platform and stopping place, past and present (1st ed.). Sparkford: Patrick Stephens Ltd. ISBN 978-1-85260-508-7. OCLC 60251199. OL 11956311M.
- Jowett, Alan (2000). Jowett's Nationalised Railway Atlas (1st ed.). Penryn, Cornwall: Atlantic Transport Publishers. ISBN 978-0-906899-99-1. OCLC 228266687.
- Jowett, Alan (March 1989). Jowett's Railway Atlas of Great Britain and Ireland: From Pre-Grouping to the Present Day (1st ed.). Sparkford: Patrick Stephens Ltd. ISBN 978-1-85260-086-0. OCLC 22311137.
- Station on navigable O.S. map
