= Aughton =

Aughton may refer to several places in England:

- Aughton, East Riding of Yorkshire
- Aughton, Lancashire, a parish in the borough of West Lancashire
- Aughton, Lancaster, a hamlet in the civil parish of Halton-with-Aughton, Lancashire
- Aughton, South Yorkshire
- Aughton, Wiltshire
