= Great Siege of Scarborough Castle =

1645 conflict in the First English Civil War

Coordinates: 54.287°N 0.388°W

- Part of the First English Civil War
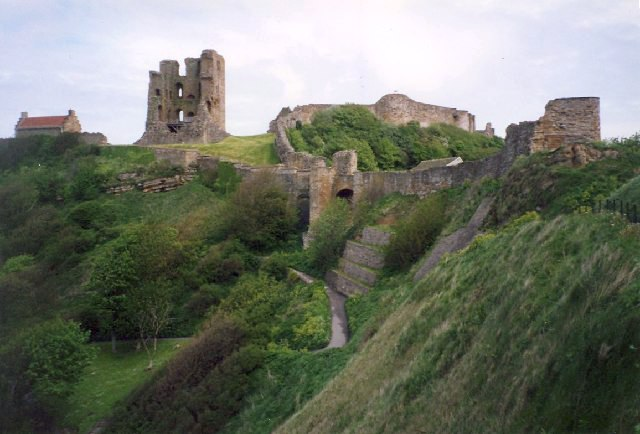
- Remains of Scarborough Castle
Date	18 February – 25 July 1645
Location	Scarborough, North Yorkshire
Result	Parliamentarian victory

Belligerents
Royalists	Parliamentarians

Commanders and leaders
Sir Hugh Cholmley; William Nesfield	John Meldrum (DOW); Sir Matthew Boynton

Strength
500	1,700

Casualties and losses
c.475 killed or wounded	Unknown

The Great Siege of Scarborough Castle (Note: Scarborough Castle endured other sieges as a medieval fortress, such as in 1312, 1536, 1557 and 1648, but the siege of 1645 was the longest and bloodiest, hence the use of "Great".) was a major conflict for control of one of England's most important stone fortresses during the First English Civil War fought between the Parliamentarians and the Royalists loyal to King Charles I. In February 1645, Parliamentarians laid siege to Scarborough Castle. For five months, they bombarded it, destroying most of the keep, and engaged in bloody fighting before the defenders finally surrendered.

This was a significant though not permanent victory. There was a second, far less bloody and destructive, siege later in 1648 when the new garrison switched sides. The castle finally came under Parliamentarian control in 1649, and remained so until the Restoration (1660). (The castle actually changed hands seven times between 1642 and 1648.)

== Background ==
Early in the English Civil War, Scarborough, its castle and strategic supply port were first held for Parliament by Sir Hugh Cholmley. In March 1643, he was persuaded to change sides. Cholmley actually lost the castle in a bloodless takeover by his own cousin, Captain Browne Bushell, in the same month while away at York, but persuaded him to give it back. Cholmley ordered the castle to be refortified, including the establishment of the South Steel Battery for artillery.

=== Royalist stronghold ===
After March 1643, although Cholmley was the only Royalist commander at work in east and north Yorkshire, his forces felt so secure at Scarborough that they could move almost freely throughout the region, targeting Parliamentarian positions. In May, Cholmley's cavalry moved north of Whitby, 20 miles away, and pillaged the estate of the Earl of Mulgrave, a loyal Parliamentarian. In June, Cholmley captured the marketplace at Beverley, some 30 miles from the castle, and from September to October 1643 he was present at the unsuccessful second Siege of Hull.

Though Cholmley's activities were a nuisance to the Parliamentarians, these victories were never decisive, and Parliament considered the King's south-western strongholds far more important targets. However, piracy ensured that Scarborough became a priority. The port was a safe haven for Royalist ships which attacked and plundered ships taking coal to London, which would become a more pressing concern as winter approached. The port was also a safe place for arms to be imported for the Royalist armies.

The Royalist failure at Hull and the entry of the Scottish Covenanters into the war on Parliament's side in late 1643 resulted in a run of Parliamentarian victories across Yorkshire. On 2 July 1644, the Parliamentarians and Covenanters won a great victory at the Battle of Marston Moor. The next day, the Marquess of Newcastle, the King's captain-general in the north, and several of his senior officers, took ships from Scarborough and went into exile on the continent, abandoning the fight. Two weeks later, the city of York surrendered. Scarborough was left the most important Royalist garrison in Yorkshire, but many of Cholmley's garrison deserted and the castle fell into disrepair.

In August, Lord Fairfax's Parliamentarian force reached the edge of the town. Cholmley bought time to upgrade the castle defences by opening surrender negotiations, an act that would allow him to hold out for a year.

== Siege ==
On 18 February 1645, Sir John Meldrum took the town at the head of 1700 men. They suffered almost no casualties. They also took the South Steel Battery and the port, cutting off all escape by land and sea for the Royalists. Cholmley retreated into the castle and refused to give in, so the Parliamentarians prepared for what would be a five-month siege, one of the most bloody of the civil war, with almost continuous fighting.

Parliament was less interested in the castle once the port was theirs, and Meldrum was forced to appeal for extra funds from other ports by raising the spectre of Royalist pirates such as Bushell making devastating raids on Parliamentarian supply lines. Over several weeks, as the funds began to trickle through to Scarborough, allowing Meldrum the forces he needed to attempt an all-out siege, Parliament came around to the idea that besieging the castle should be made a priority. The siege was delayed for six weeks, however, while Meldrum recovered from an astonishing fall over the cliff edge on 24 March. According to Cholmley, he had been trying to retrieve his hat from the wind, though the more likely explanation is that a sudden gust blew him off the cliff. Meanwhile, the garrison initially had access to drinking water from local springs and the "Well of Our Lady" near the cliff edge which with stockpiled food allowed them to defend the castle for months.

=== Bombardment of the castle ===
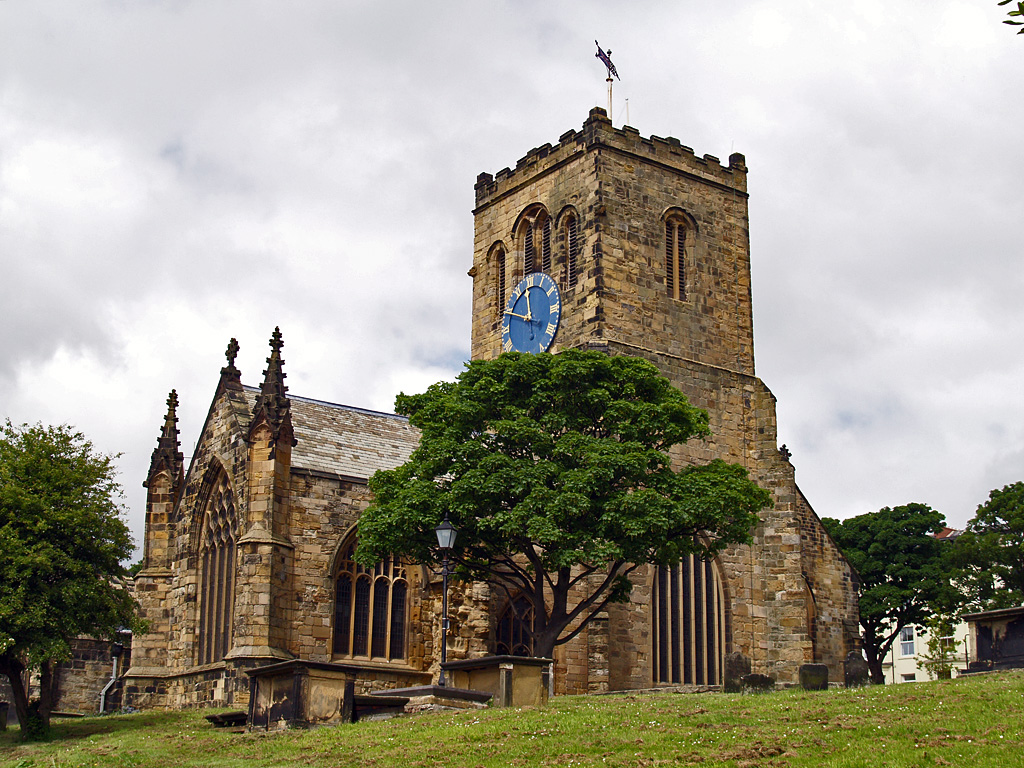
St. Mary's Church near the castle was on the front line during the siege, sustaining extensive damage from both sides. One side of the church remains a ruin.

Once Meldrum resumed command in May, the Parliamentarian forces set up what was then the largest cannon in the country, the "Cannon Royal", in the twelfth-century St. Mary's Church below the castle, and proceeded to fire 56–65 pounds (25–29 kg) cannonballs that pounded the castle's defences. The Royalists replied with their own forward battery under Bushell. The church was extensively damaged over the three days of fighting, and is partly ruined to this day; records report that Cholmley "did great mischief to St. Mary's", though it is more likely that the Parliamentarian gun blasts did more damage to a building that was already decaying. The bombardment partially destroyed the castle keep by collapsing the west wall, its roof, the floors and its interior staircase. The outer walls had not been breached however, and the Parliamentarians were unable to take the castle immediately afterwards. Indeed, they had inadvertently supplied the defenders with a large pile of rubble that could be used for cover and ammunition. Meldrum failed to realise until it was too late that the Royalists were cut off from the barbican by the sheer amount of rubble blocking the way, and therefore did not attempt to take the castle entranceway until the Royalists had already broken through and retaken control. Meldrum was only able to take Bushell's battery, where he set up 34-pound cannons to target the castle yard. On the night of 10 May, the Royalists moved against the artillery battery, destroying it, and the Parliamentarians retreated in some disarray, taking heavy casualties. There followed a period of particularly bloody hand-to-hand fighting around the barbican gateway the next day, where neither side took prisoners; ultimately, Meldrum was mortally wounded.

=== Surrender ===
By July 1645, the tide was turning in the Parliamentarians' favour. Sir Matthew Boynton had replaced Meldrum. He preferred to bombard the castle from land and sea, rather than make further infantry assaults. The bombardment, scurvy, lack of water, perhaps a shortage of gunpowder and the threat of starvation meant that the castle's surrender came at noon on 25 July. There were only 25 defenders left fit to fight. Fewer than half the original 500 defenders emerged alive, receiving a less-than-warm welcome from the townsfolk, who had endured great hardship during the siege. Perhaps to bring a quick end to hostilities, Cholmley had received unprecedently good surrender terms, and left for exile in Holland.

== Aftermath ==
Initially repaired and rearmed for Parliament with a company of 160 to hold the castle and man the gun batteries, the castle returned to Royalist hands when the soldiers went unpaid; Matthew Boynton, its new governor and son of the elder Boynton, declared for the King on 27 July 1648. This led to a second siege which brought the castle back under Parliamentary control on 19 December, with the garrison defeated as much by the oncoming winter as by the Parliamentary forces. Following this, the castle was to have been demolished by an order of July 1649, to prevent it being used as a Royalist stronghold, but a local outcry saved it, along with new fears that resurgent Royalist forces were plotting to retake Scarborough, and the actual appearance of Dutch vessels in the harbour. Instead, it was used as a prison for those deemed enemies of the Commonwealth of England, the country's brief period of republicanism; the shell of the keep survives, minus the west wall. The castle was returned to the crown following the restoration of the monarchy.

== Bibliography ==
- Binns, J. (1996). A Place of Great Importance: Scarborough in the Civil Wars. Lancaster: Carnegie. ISBN 1-85936-018-1.
- Goodall, J.A.A. (2000). Scarborough Castle. London: English Heritage. ISBN 1-85074-786-5.
- Page, W., ed. (1923). "The Borough of Scarborough". A History of the County of York North Riding. Vol. 2. London: St. Catherine Press. pp. 538–560.
- Pope, Stan (January 2000). A Brief History of St. Mary's. Scarborough: St. Mary's Church. Archived from the original on 7 August 2007.
- Scarborough Community Heritage Initiative (2003). A Guide to Historic Scarborough. Scarborough: Scarborough Archaeological Society. ISBN 0-902416-07-3.

Attribution
