= John Meldrum =

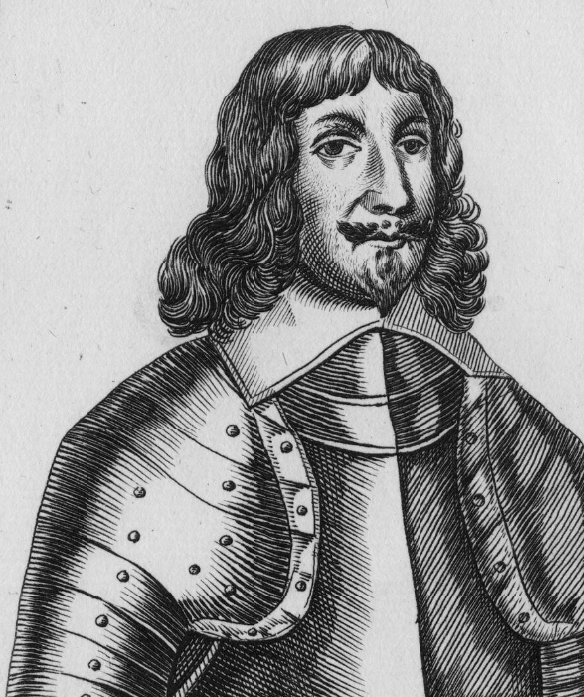
A 1647 engraving of Meldrum

Sir John Meldrum (c. 1590 – died 1645) was a soldier of Scottish origin who spent 36 years in the service of the Stuart kings of Scotland, England and Ireland, James VI and I and Charles I.

He was granted lands in County Fermanagh as a result of his Irish service and was knighted by King James I in 1622. In 1627, he took part in the Duke of Buckingham's ill-fated expedition to La Rochelle then spent several years as a colonel in the Swedish army under Gustavus Adolphus.

In 1636, he benefited from a grant of letters-patent (a controversial monopoly) on several lighthouses built by Charles I on the North and South Forelands that entitled him to levy a penny per ton of cargo carried by ships that passed them.

In 1642, he found himself opposed to the policies of Charles' government and supported the Parliamentarian cause in the Civil War. He commanded a brigade of infantry at the Battle of Edge Hill. His most notable action was his defeat by Prince Rupert at the relief of Newark in early 1644. He also directed the successful construction of a firing platform in Gosport during the Siege of Portsmouth.

On 20 August 1644, his forces defeated royalist cavalry force numbering about 2500 at the Battle of Ormskirk. He was a commander at the Relief of Montgomery Castle on 18 September 1644. He was killed during the Great Siege of Scarborough Castle in May 1645.
