= Aughton, Lancashire =

Village and parish in West Lancashire, England

Coordinates: 53.542°N 2.912°W

Aughton
- Village and parish
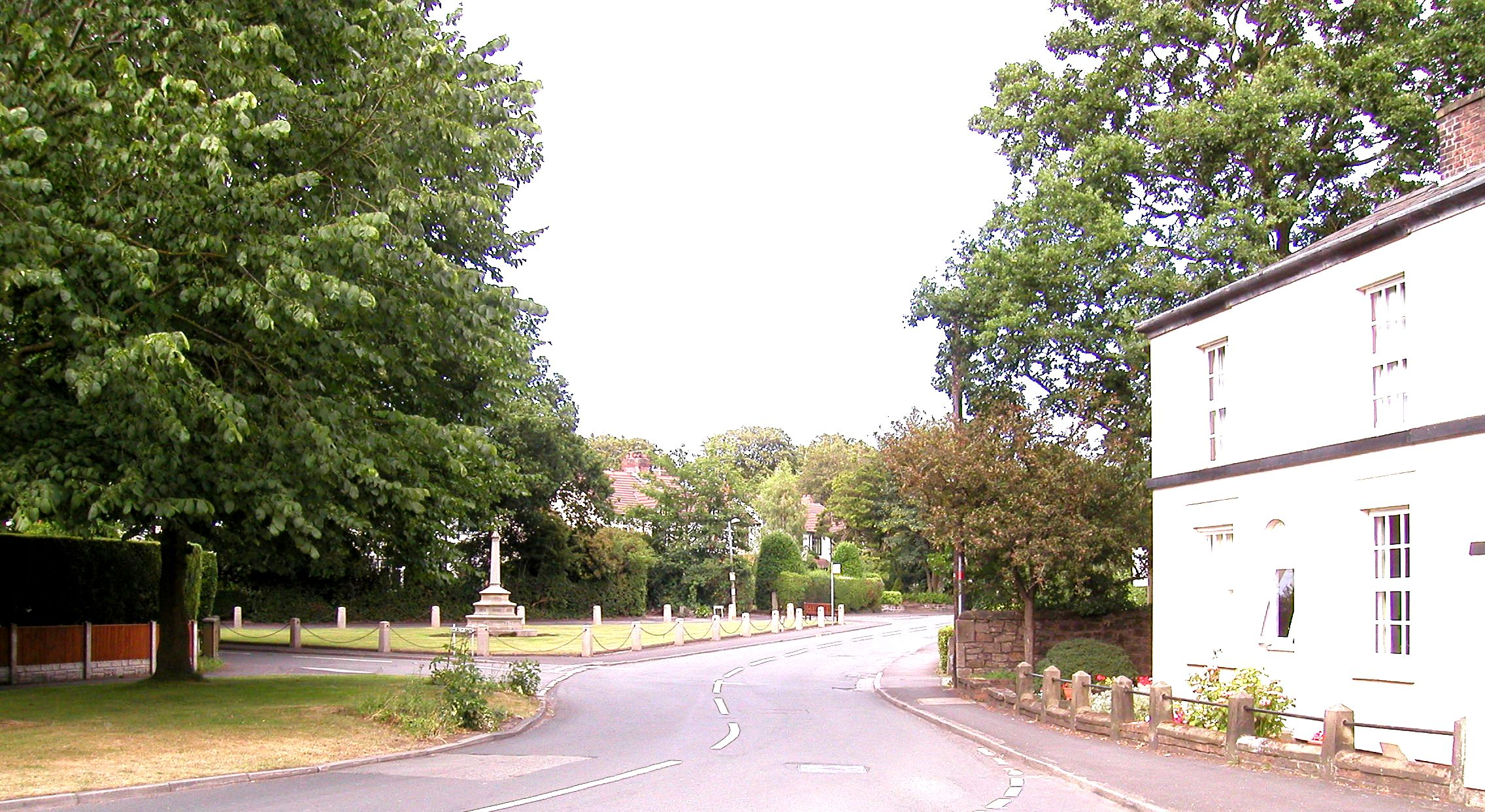
- Holt Green

- Shown within West Lancashire Location within Lancashire
- Population: 8,068 (2011 Census)
- OS grid reference: SD395055
- Civil parish: Aughton
- District: West Lancashire
- Shire county: Lancashire
- Region: North West
- Country: England
- Sovereign state: United Kingdom
- Post town: ORMSKIRK
- Postcode district: L39
- Dialling code: 01695
- Police: Lancashire
- Fire: Lancashire
- Ambulance: North West
- UK Parliament: West Lancashire

Aughton is a village and civil parish in the West Lancashire district of Lancashire, England. It is located between Ormskirk and Maghull, approximately 10 miles (16 km) north of Liverpool and 20 miles (32 km) south-west of Preston.

The parish is rural to the south and west. The north-east contains Town Green and the southern part of Aughton Park, which are suburbs of Ormskirk. The village of Aughton is located in the south-west.

Internationally, the village is known for its three fine dining restaurants with five Michelin stars between them as of 2025.

== Demographics and politics ==
At the 2021 Census Aughton had a population of 8,034, a reduction from 8,068 at the 2011 Census and 8,342 at the 2001 Census. The parish includes the village of Aughton and the adjacent area of Holt Green, and the southern part of Aughton Park, and Town Green.

Aughton has its own parish council. It is part of the Aughton and Downholland electoral ward for West Lancashire District Council elections and the West Lancashire constituency for the House of Commons elections.

== Transport ==
The A59 road, which runs between Liverpool and York, passes through the parish from north to south, bypassing Aughton village to the west. The B5197 road also runs north-south through the village.

The parish has two railway stations, Town Green and Aughton Park, both on the Northern Line of the Merseyrail network, and part of the former Liverpool, Ormskirk and Preston Railway.

== Facilities ==
Aughton has two shopping areas: on Moss Delph Lane and Town Green Lane. Also, there are playing fields and a park next to the fields and other open spaces totalling 36 acres (150,000 m^{2}). There is a community centre, the Aughton Village Hall. The hall was opened in 1971 on land donated to the District Council. It is a registered charity and managed by a voluntary committee.

Having moved from premises in Holt Green, the official opening of the new Aughton police station on 3 March 2003 saw it occupy the old waiting room and general outbuildings of Town Green railway station. At that time, this police station was the first in the Lancashire Constabulary to have the enquiry counter staffed exclusively by volunteers.

There are two notable churches, Christ Church, a late Victorian building situated on Holborn Hill, one of the higher points in West Lancashire, and St Michael's Parish Church. St Michael's has been designated by English Heritage as a Grade I listed building. Aughton Park Baptist Church and St Mary's R C Church are also located within the civil parish. Moor Hall, on Prescot Road, is a Grade II* listed manor house built around 1600. It was converted in the spring 2017 to a restaurant with rooms, being awarded a Michelin star later that year.

On Bold Lane is a social club, the Aughton Institute. Within the Institute is a memorial to three men from the Parish who were killed in World War I and to 40 men who served. It was unveiled on 11 February 1922 by the 17th Earl of Derby.

=== Restaurants ===
There are three fine dining restaurants in Aughton with five Michelin stars between them as of 2025: Moor Hall, The Barn and sō-lō. The high proportion of quality restaurants and other culinary establishments have seen Aughton surpass Kyoto as the place with the highest proportion of Michelin stars per head of the population, and have helped Aughton gain international attention as a destination for culinary tourists.

== Notable people ==
- Frank Lake (1914–1982), psychiatrist, a pioneer of pastoral counselling.
- John Grindrod (1919–2009), Anglican Primate of Australia.
- Les Pattinson (born 1958), bass player for Echo & the Bunnymen, raised locally.
- Will Sergeant (born 1958), guitarist for Echo & the Bunnymen, lived locally.

=== Sport ===
- Barbara Hammond (1943–2009), equestrian, competed in two events at the 1988 Summer Olympics.
- Colin Harvey (born 1944), footballer, played 365 matches, including 320 for Everton, lives locally.
- Alan Kennedy (born 1954), former footballer played 506 games, including 251 for Liverpool and 2 for England, lived locally.
- Barry Cowan (born 1974), tennis player and commentator for Sky Sports, former member of Aughton Tennis Club
- Gavin Griffiths (born 1993), Leicestershire County Cricketer, played 31 First-class cricket matches, lives locally.

== Gallery ==
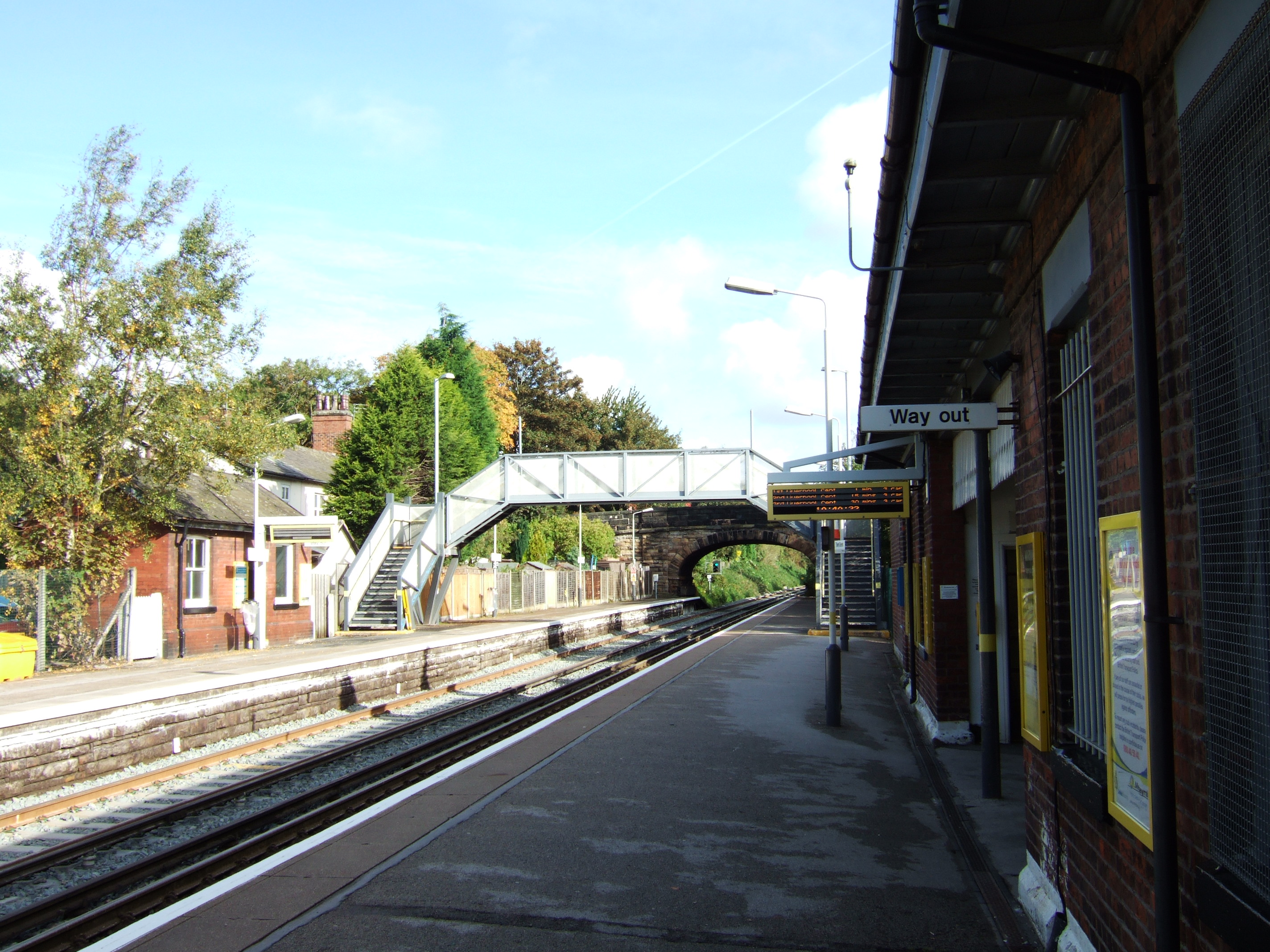
Town Green station

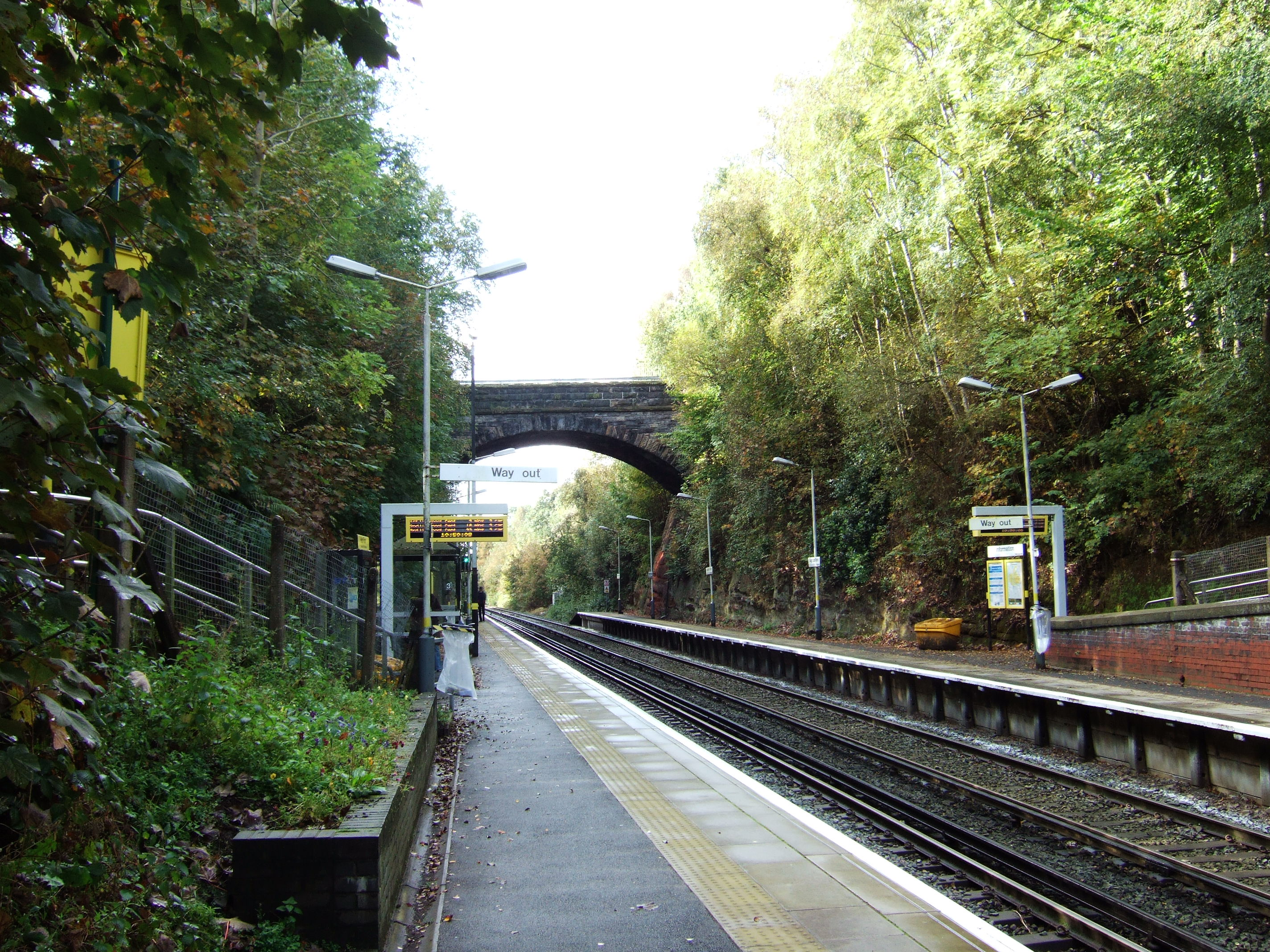
Aughton Park station

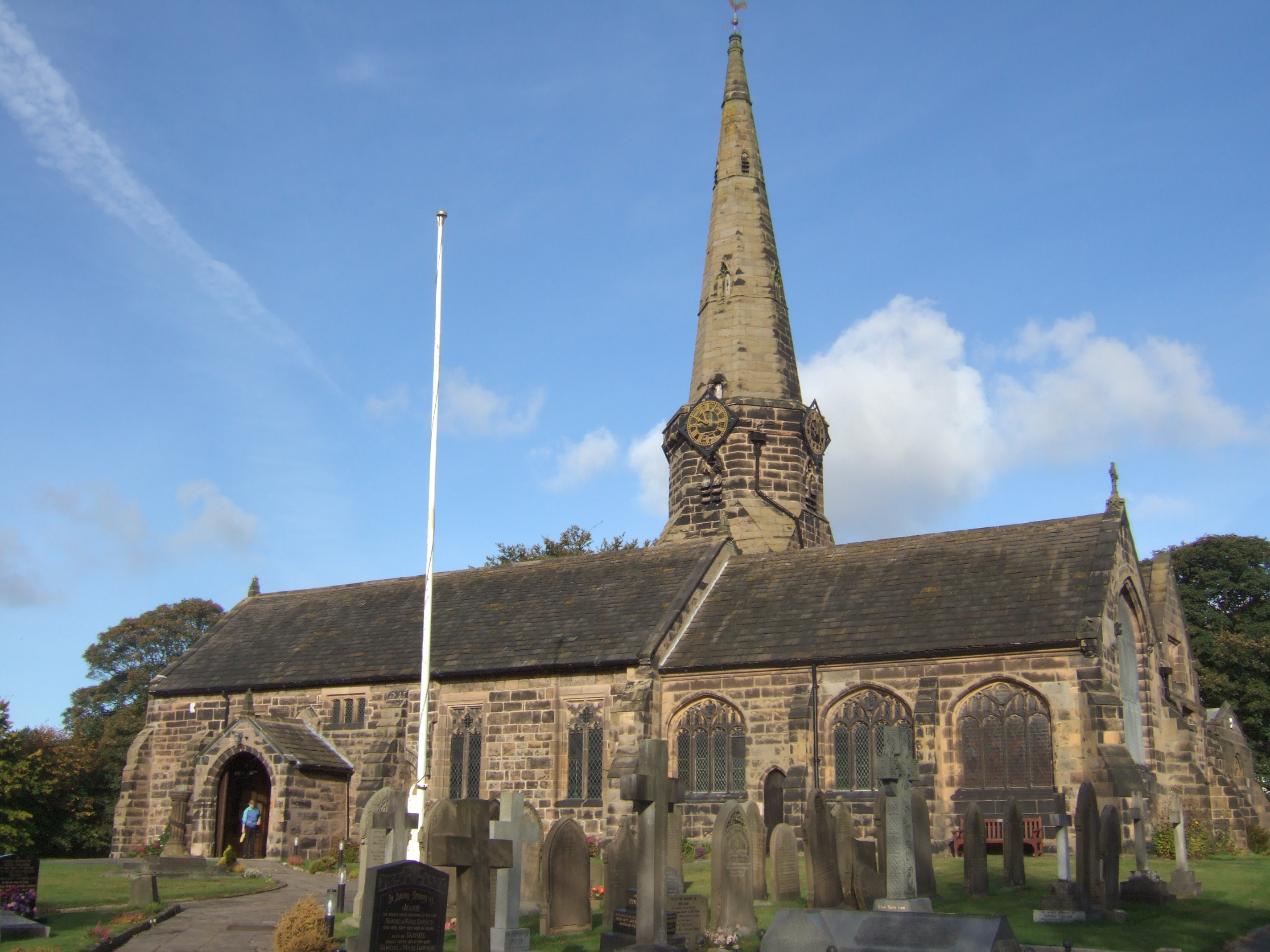
St Michael's Parish Church

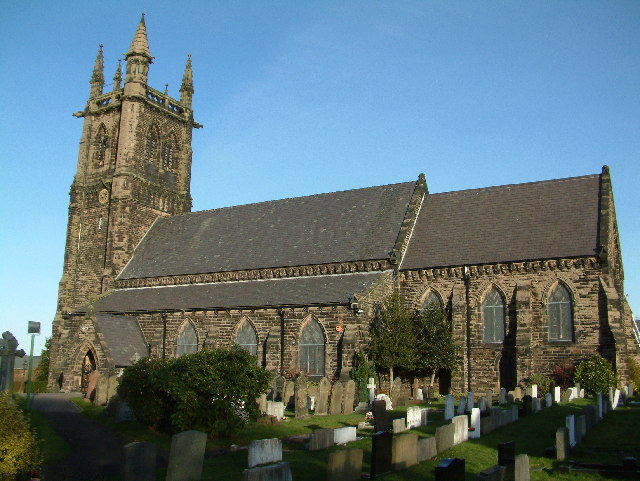
Christ Church

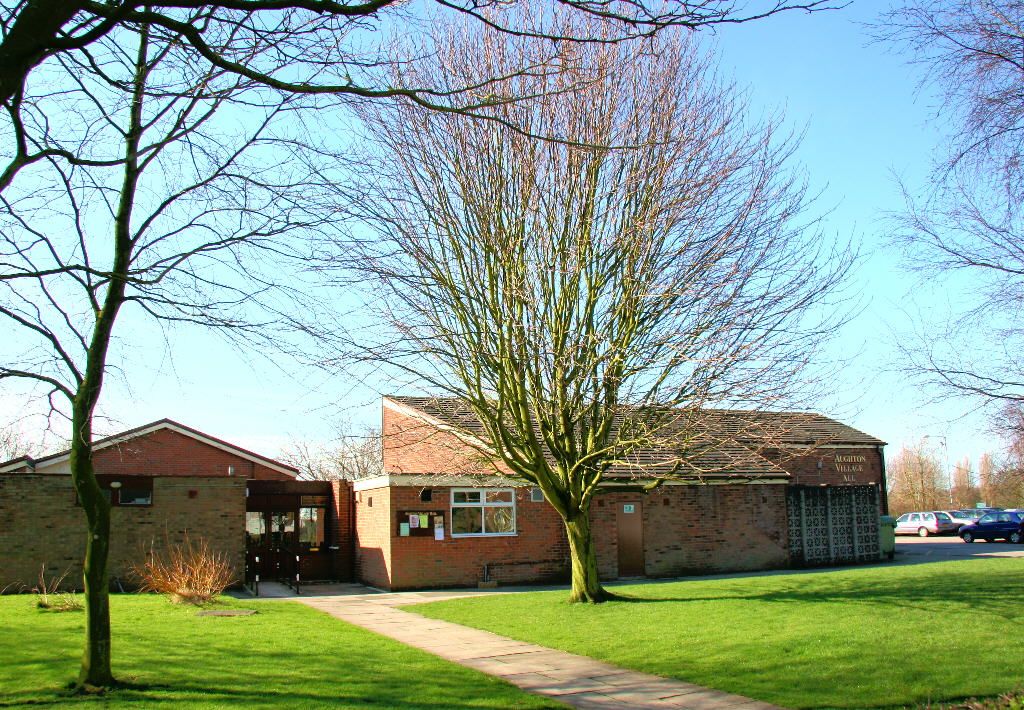
Aughton Village Hall

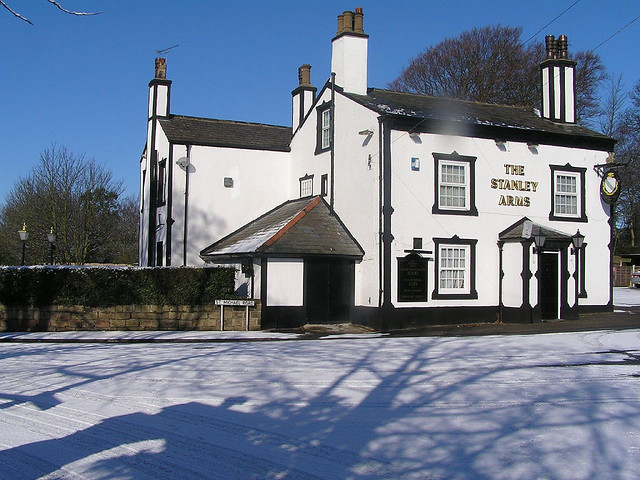
The Stanley Arms Pub

== See also ==
- Listed buildings in Aughton, Lancashire
- Argleton, a non-existent town which appeared on Google Maps within the boundaries of Aughton civil parish
