= List of heritage railway stations in the United Kingdom =

This is a list of heritage railway stations in the United Kingdom.

== A ==
Station name	Coordinates	Location	Height	Platforms	Arrivals and departures (if applicable)	Station information (if applicable)	Historic open date	Closed date(s)	Heritage station open date	Joint station?	Which system?	Gauge
Aberffrwd	52.390553°N 3.930085°W	Aberffrwd		2			1903			No	Vale of Rheidol	
Abergynolwyn	52.638611°N 3.966111°W	Abergynolwyn		1			1865	1950	1951	No	Talyllyn Railway	
Aberystwyth	50.4139°N 4.08157°W	Aberystwyth					1864			Yes	National Rail, Vale of Rheidol	
Alresford	51.088395°N 1.161096°W	New Alresford					1865	1973	1977	No	Watercress Line	
Alton	51.152°N 0.96766°W	Alton			AON	Station details	1852		1985	Yes	Watercress Line, National Rail	
Ashey	50.695849°N 1.182244°W	Ashey		1			1865	1966	1993	No	Isle of Wight Steam Railway	
Aviemore	57.188611°N 3.828611°W	Aviemore			AVM	Station details	1898		1998	Yes	Strathspey Railway, National Rail	

== B ==
Station name	Coordinates	Location	Height	Platforms	Arrivals and departures (if applicable)	Station information (if applicable)	Historic open date	Closed date(s)	Heritage station open date	Joint station?	Which system?	Gauge
Berwyn	52.97948°N 3.19544°W	Berwyn		1			1865	1964	1986	No	Llangollen Railway	
Bewdley	52.375278°N 2.306111°W	Bewdley		3			1862	1970	1974	No	Severn Valley Railway	
Bishops Lydeard	51.05413°N 3.19342°W	Bishops Lydeard		2			1862	1971	1979	Yes	West Somerset Railway; National Rail	
Bitton		Bitton		2			1869	1966	1972	No	Avon Valley Railway	
Blaenau Ffestiniog	52.9946°N 3.93838°W	Blaenau Ffestiniog		3	BFF	Station details			1982	Yes	Ffestiniog Railway; National Rail	
Blue Anchor	51.18152°N 3.40239°W	Blue Anchor		2			1904	1971	1976	No	West Somerset Railway	
Blunsdon	51.60702°N 1.84362°W	Blunsdon		1			1895	1937	1978	No	Swindon and Cricklade Railway	
Boat of Garten	57.2480°N 3.7524°W	Boat of Garten		2			1863	1965	1978	No	Strathspey Railway	
Bodiam		Bodiam		1			1900	1954	2005	No	Kent and East Sussex Railway	
Bodmin Parkway	50.4662°N 4.7168°W	near Lanhydrock		3	BOD	Station details	1859		1990	Yes	Bodmin and Wenford Railway; National Rail	
Bodmin General	50.4599°N 4.6745°W	Bodmin					1887	1967	1986	No	Bodmin and Wenford Railway	
Bontnewydd	53.115972°N 4.274778°W	Bontnewydd							1999	No	Welsh Highland Railway	
Boscarne Junction	50.4740°N 4.7614°W	Dunmere							1997	No	Bodmin and Wenford Railway	
Boston Lodge Halt	52.92086°N 4.10469°W	Near Minffordd					1928	1939	1955	No	Ffestiniog Railway	
Boughton	52.2823°N 0.9209°W	Northampton		1					2024	No	Northampton & Lamport Railway	
Broomhill	57.2834°N 3.6669°W	Broomhill, near Nethy Bridge					1863	1965	2002	No	Strathspey Railway	
Brownhills West	52.6627°N 1.9531°W	Near Brownhills								No	Chasewater Railway	
Bridgnorth	52.53059°N 2.42093°W	Bridgnorth					1862	1963	1970	No	Severn Valley Railway	
Broadway	54.0429°N 1.872°E	Broadway		2			1904	1960	2021	No	Gloucestershire Warwickshire Railway	
Buckfastleigh	50.48284°N 3.76877°W	Buckfastleigh					1872	1958	1969	No	South Devon Railway	
Burrs Country Park	53.6108°N 2.30376°W	Burrs Country Park		1					2016	No	East Lancashire Railway	
Burmarsh Road	51.036036°N 1.004208°E	Dymchurch					1927	2015		No	Romney, Hythe and Dymchurch Railway	
Bury Bolton Street	53.5934°N 2.2997°W	Bury		4			1846	1980	1987	No	East Lancashire Railway	

== C ==
Station name	Coordinates	Location	Height	Platforms	Arrivals and departures (if applicable)	Station information (if applicable)	Historic open date	Closed date(s)	Heritage station open date	Joint station?	Which system?	Gauge
Caernarfon	53.1375°N 4.271944°W	Caernarfon		1					1997	No	Welsh Highland Railway	
Capel Bangor	52.399300°N 3.988840°W	Capel Bangor		2			1902			No	Vale of Rheidol Railway	
Carrog	52.9817°N 3.3155°W	Carrog		2			1865	1964	1996	No	Llangollen Railway	
Cheltenham Race Course	51.924°N 2.0683°W	Cheltenham Racecourse		2			1912	1976	2003	No	Gloucestershire Warwickshire Railway	
Chinnor	51.6978°N 0.9069°W	Chinnor		1			1872	1957	1994	No	Chinnor & Princes Risborough	
Cholsey		Cholsey		5			1892		1985	yes	Cholsey and Wallingford Railway	
Churston		Churston		2			1864	1972	1972	No	Paignton and Dartmouth Steam Railway	
Clogwyn	53.0841°N 4.0803°W	Snowdon		1			1896			No	Snowdon Mountain Railway	
Colesloggett Halt	50.4461°N 4.6627°W	near Cardinham Woods		1					1993	No	Bodmin and Wenford Railway	≠
Corfe Castle	50.6383°N 2.0551°W	Corfe Castle		2			1885	1972	1995	No	Swanage Railway	
Corwen	52.98138°N 3.37852°W	Corwen		2			1865	1964	2019	No	Llangollen Railway	
Country Park Halt	52.4548°N 2.375622°W	Highley		1					1996	No	Severn Valley Railway	
Cranmore		Cranmore,Somerset		2			1858	1963	1975	No	East Somerset Railway	
Crowcombe Heathfield	51.1011°N 3.23332°W	Crowcombe		2			1862	1971	1979	No	West Somerset Railway	

== D ==
Station name	Coordinates	Location	Height	Platforms	Arrivals and departures (if applicable)	Station information (if applicable)	Historic open date	Closed date(s)	Heritage station open date	Joint station?	Which system?	Gauge
Damems	53.8459°N 1.9245°E	Damems		1			1967	1949	1968	No	Keighley and Worth Valley	
Darley Dale	53.1601°N 1.5937°E	Darley Dale		2			1849	1967	1991	No	Peak Rail	
Devil's Bridge	52.376051°N 3.855007°E	Devil's Bridge					1902			No	Vale of Rheidol	
Dduallt	52.9602°N 3.9686°W	Snowdonia					1880	1939	1968	No	Ffestiniog Railway	
Dinas	53.104194°N 4.276278°W	Dinas					1867	1951	1997	No	Welsh Highland	
Doniford Halt	51.1760°N 3.3111°W	Watchet		1			n/a	n/a	1987	No	West Somerset	
Downpatrick	54.3255°N 5.7222°W	Downpatrick		2			1859	1950	1990	No	Downpatrick and County Down Railway	
Downpatrick Loop Platform	54.3239°N 5.7297°W	Downpatrick		2			1892	1950	1987	No	Downpatrick and County Down Railway	
Drummuir	57.4842°N 3.0382°W	Drummuir					1862	1968	2003	No	Keith and Dufftown Railway	
Duffield	52.988°N 1.486°E	Duffield		3			1841		2011	Yes	Ecclesbourne Valley Railway; National Rail	
Dufftown	57.4582°N 3.1308°W	Dufftown					1862	1968	2003	No	Keith and Dufftown Railway	
Dungeness	50.914459°N 0.970844°E	Dungeness							1928	No	RH&DR	
Dunster	51.1929°N 3.4381°W	Dunster		1			1862	1971	1976	No	West Somerset	
Dymchurch	51.025171°N 0.990344°E	Dymchurch							1927	No	RH&DR	

== E ==
Station name	Coordinates	Location	Height	Platforms	Arrivals and departures (if applicable)	Station information (if applicable)	Historic open date	Closed date(s)	Heritage station open date	Joint station?	Which system?	Gauge
East Grinstead		East Grinstead							2013	No	Bluebell Railway	
Embsay	53.975391°N 1.99124°W	Embsay					1888	1962	1979	No	Embsay and Bolton Abbey Steam Railway	
Eridge		Eridge Green					1868		2011	Yes	Spa Valley Railway; National Rail	
Eythorne		Eythorne					1916	1948	1993	No	East Kent Light Railway	

== F ==
Station name	Coordinates	Location	Height	Platforms	Arrivals and departures (if applicable)	Station information (if applicable)	Historic open date	Closed date(s)	Heritage station open date	Joint station?	Which system?	Gauge

== G ==
Station name	Coordinates	Location	Height	Platforms	Arrivals and departures (if applicable)	Station information (if applicable)	Historic open date	Closed date(s)	Heritage station open date	Joint station?	Which system?	Gauge
Glanyrafon	52.404515°N 4.037931°E	Glanyrafon					1904			No	Vale of Rheidol	
Glyndyfrdwy	52.9762°N 3.2682°E	Glyndyfrdwy					1865	1964	1993	No	Llangollen Railway	
Goathland	54.400401°N 0.711831°W	Goathland		2			1865	1965	1973	No	North Yorkshire Moors Railway	
Goodrington Sands		Paignton					1928	1972	1972	No	Paignton and Dartmouth Steam Railway	
Gotherington	51.9672°N 2.0378°W	Gotherington		1			1906	1955	1997	No	Gloucestershire Warwickshire Railway	
Groombridge		Groombridge					1866	1985	1997	No	Spa Valley Railway	
Grosmont	54.436268°N 0.724808°W	Grosmont		3	GMT	Station details	1832		1977	Yes	North Yorkshire Moors Railway, National Rail	
Gelert's Farm halt	52.93115°N 4.12861°W	Porthmadog							1988	No	Welsh Highland Heritage Railway	

== H ==
Station name	Coordinates	Location	Height	Platforms	Arrivals and departures (if applicable)	Station information (if applicable)	Historic open date	Closed date(s)	Heritage station open date	Joint station?	Which system?	Gauge
Halfway	53.0954°N 4.0962°W	Snowdon		1			1896			No	Snowdon Mountain Railway	
Hampton Loade	52.473792°N 2.377033°W	Hampton Loade					1862	1963	1970	No	Severn Valley Railway	
Haverthwaite	54.249°N 2.999°W	Haverthwaite		1			1869	1955	1973	No	Lakeside and Haverthwaite	
Havenstreet	50.705056°N 1.213243°W	Havenstreet					1875	1966	1971	No	Isle of Wight Steam Railway	
Haworth	53.831200°N 1.948800°W	Haworth		1			1867	1962	1968	No	Keighley and Worth Valley	
Hayes Knoll	51.61348°N 1.84692°W	Blunsdon		1					1999	No	Swindon and Cricklade Railway	
Hayles Abbey Halt	51.9752°N 1.9331°W	Hailes		1			1928	1960	2017	No	Gloucestershire Warwickshire Railway	
Hebron	53.1045°N 4.1179°W	Snowdon		1			1896			No	Snowdon Mountain Railway	
Heywood	53.5889°N 2.2069°W	Heywood		1			1848	1970	2003	No	East Lancashire Railway	
High Rocks		near Tunbridge Wells					1907	1952	1998	No	Spa Valley Railway	
Highley	52.444845°N 2.370628°W	Highley					1862	1963	1974	No	Severn Valley Railway	
Holt	52.9145°N 1.1133°E	High Kelling		2					1987	No	North Norfolk Railway	
Holywell Halt	53.975954°N 1.9604°W	Craven Fault							1987	No	Embsay and Bolton Abbey Steam Railway	
Horsehay and Dawley		Telford					1859	1962	1976	No	Telford Steam Railway	
Horsted Keynes	51.0461°N 0.0446°W	Horsted Keynes		5			1882	1963	1962	No	Bluebell Railway	
Hythe (RH&DR)	51.071235°N 1.072047°E	Hythe, Kent							1927	No	Romney, Hythe and Dymchurch Railway	
Hythe Pierhead	50.870707°N 1.399268°W	Hythe, Hampshire					1881		1922	No	Hythe Pier Railway	
Hythe Town	50.874653°N 1.393425°W	Hythe, Hampshire					1881		1922	No	Hythe Pier Railway	

== I ==
Station name	Coordinates	Location	Height	Platforms	Arrivals and departures (if applicable)	Station information (if applicable)	Historic open date	Closed date(s)	Heritage station open date	Joint station?	Which system?	Gauge
Idridgehay	53.035665°N 1.569157°W	Idridgehay		1		Station Details	1867	1947	2008	No	Ecclesbourne Valley Railway	
Inch Abbey	54.3380°N 5.7357°W	Inch Abbey		2					2005	No	Downpatrick and County Down Railway	
Ingrow (West)	53.853889°N 1.915°W	Ingrow		1			1867	1962	1968	No	Keighley and Worth Valley	
Irwell Vale	53.67689°N 2.31599°W	Irwell Vale		1					1991	No	East Lancashire Railway	
Isfield		Isfield		2			1858	1969	1987	No	Lavender Line	

== J ==
Station name	Coordinates	Location	Height	Platforms	Arrivals and departures (if applicable)	Station information (if applicable)	Historic open date	Closed date(s)	Heritage station open date	Joint station?	Which system?	Gauge

== K ==
Station name	Coordinates	Location	Height	Platforms	Arrivals and departures (if applicable)	Station information (if applicable)	Historic open date	Closed date(s)	Heritage station open date	Joint station?	Which system?	Gauge
Keighley	53.8679°N 1.9011°W	Keighley		4			1887		1968	Yes	National Rail, Keighley and Worth Valley	
Keith Town	57.5441°N 2.9547°W	Keith		1			1862	1968	2005	No	Keith and Dufftown Railway	
Kelling Heath Park	52.932174°N 1.137592°E	Kelling Heath		1					1989	No	North Norfolk Railway	
Kidderminster Town	52.38419°N 2.239537°W	Kidderminster		2					1984	No	Severn Valley Railway	
Killington Lane	51.19608°N 3.90427°W	Parracombe		1					2006	No	Lynton and Barnstaple Railway	
King Magnus' Halt	54.3195°N 5.7308°W			1					1995	No	Downpatrick and County Down Railway	
Kingscote	51.1031°N 0.0486°W	Turners Hill		2			1882	1955	1994	No	Bluebell Railway	
Kingswear		Kingswear		2			1864	1972	1972	No	Paignton and Dartmouth Steam Railway	

== L ==
Station name	Coordinates	Location	Height	Platforms	Arrivals and departures (if applicable)	Station information (if applicable)	Historic open date	Closed date(s)	Heritage station open date	Joint station?	Which system?	Gauge
Lakeside	54.2783°N 2.9555°W	Lakeside		1			1869	1965	1973	No	Lakeside and Haverthwaite	
Leicester North	52.668785°N 1.132665°W	Leicester							1991	No	Great Central Railway	
Levisham	54.308171°N 0.744367°W	Levisham					1836	1965	1973	No	North Yorkshire; Moors Railway	
Llanbadarn	52.405748°N 4.061228°W	Llanbadarn Fawr					1902			No	Vale of Rheidol	
Llanberis (SMR)	53.1162°N 4.1195°W	Llanberis		2			1896			No	Snowdon Mountain Railway	
Llangollen	52.9709°N 3.1703°W	Llangollen					1862	1965	1981	No	Llangollen Railway	
Loughborough Central	52.7686°N 1.1959°W	Loughborough		2			1899	1969	1974	No	Great Central Railway	
Lydney Junction		Lydney		2			1875	1960	1995	No	Dean Forest Railway	

== M ==
Station name	Coordinates	Location	Height	Platforms	Arrivals and departures (if applicable)	Station information (if applicable)	Historic open date	Closed date(s)	Heritage station open date	Joint station?	Which system?	Gauge
Market Bosworth	52.624583°N 1.420972°W	Market Bosworth		2			1873	1931	2011	No	Battlefield Line Railway	
Matlock	53.138°N 1.559°W	Matlock		2			1849		2011	Yes	National Rail; Peak Rail	
Medstead and Four Marks	51.113412°N 1.045807°W	Medstead					1868	1973	1983	No	Watercress Line	
Minehead	51.2061°N 3.4668°W	Minehead		2			1874	1971	1976	No	West Somerset Railway	
Minffordd	52.926°N 4.084°W	Minffordd			MFF	Station details	1872		1956	Yes	Ffestiniog Railway, National Rail	
Moor Road	53.775070°N 1.538600°W	Hunslet		1					2006	No	Middleton Railway	

== N ==
Station name	Coordinates	Location	Height	Platforms	Arrivals and departures (if applicable)	Station information (if applicable)	Historic open date	Closed date(s)	Heritage station open date	Joint station?	Which system?	Gauge
Nantyronen	52.385383°N 3.948169°E	Nantyronen		1			1902			No	Vale of Rheidol	
Newby Bridge	54.269°N 2.974°E	Newby Bridge		1			1905	1949	1973	No	Lakeside and Haverthwaite	
New Romney	50.985792°N 0.95414°E	New Romney		4					1927	No	Romney Hythe and Dymchurch Railway	
Newton Dale Halt	54.342427°N 0.717445°W	Newton Dale		1					1981	No	North Yorkshire Moors Railway	
North Weald	51.71167°N 0.16167°E	North Weald		2			1865	1994	2004	No	Epping Ongar Railway	
Northiam		Northiam					1900	1954	1990	No	Kent and East Sussex Railway	
Northwood Halt	52.394791°N 2.327637°W	Wyre Forest					1935	1963	1974	No	Severn Valley Railway	
Norton Fitzwarren	51.02481°N 3.15723°W	Norton Fitzwarren		1					2009	No	West Somerset Railway	

== O ==
Station name	Coordinates	Location	Height	Platforms	Arrivals and departures (if applicable)	Station information (if applicable)	Historic open date	Closed date(s)	Heritage station open date	Joint station?	Which system?	Gauge
Oakworth	53.841430°N 1.941600°E	Oakworth		1			1867	1962	1968	No	Keighley and Worth Valley	
Oldland Common Halt		Oldland Common		1			1930	1966	1997	No	Avon Valley Railway	
Ongar	51.70889°N 0.24278°E	Ongar		1			1865	1994	2004	No	Epping Ongar Railway	
Orton Mere		Peterborough		2					1984	No	Nene Valley	
Overton		Peterborough		1			1845	1942	1977	No	Nene Valley	
Oxenhope	53.815440°N 1.951860°E	Oxenhope		1			1867	1962	1968	No	Keighley and Worth Valley	

== P ==
Station name	Coordinates	Location	Height	Platforms	Arrivals and departures (if applicable)	Station information (if applicable)	Historic open date	Closed date(s)	Heritage station open date	Joint station?	Which system?	Gauge
Page's Park		Leighton Buzzard		2						No	Leighton Buzzard Light Railway	
Paignton		Paignton							1972	yes	Paignton and Dartmouth Steam Railway	
Park Halt	53.7614°N 1.5364°E	Middleton Park								No	Middleton Railway	
Parkend	51.7678°N 2.5560°W	Parkend		2			1875	1929	2006	No	Dean Forest Railway	GW Broad gauge to 1874 then Std gauge
Penrhyn	52.93514°N 4.06484°W	Penrhyndeudraeth					1865	1939	1957	No	Ffestiniog Railway	
Pen-y-Mount	52.93415°N 4.12392°W	Porthmadog							1980	No	Welsh Highland Heritage Railway	
Peterborough Nene Valley		Peterborough		1					1986	No	Nene Valley Railway	
Pickering	54.247343°N 0.778248°W	Pickering					1836	1965	1973	No	North Yorkshire Moors Railway	
Plas Halt	52.948°N 4.003°W	Near Maentwrog							1963	No	Ffestiniog Railway	
Plas-y-Nant	53.082917°N 4.169806°W	Plas-y-Nant							2003	No	Welsh Highland Railway	
Porthmadog (WHR)	52.93085°N 4.13265°W	Porthmadog							1980	No	Welsh Highland Heritage Railway	
Porthmadog Harbour	52.9239°N 4.127°W	Porthmadog					1865	1946	1955	Yes	Ffestiniog Railway; Welsh Highland Railway	
Princes Risborough	51.718°N 0.844°E	Princes Risborough					1892		2018	Yes	National Rail; Chinnor & Princes Risborough	

== Q ==
Station name	Coordinates	Location	Height	Platforms	Arrivals and departures (if applicable)	Station information (if applicable)	Historic open date	Closed date(s)	Heritage station open date	Joint station?	Which system?	Gauge
Quainton Road	51.864363°N 0.928924°W	Quainton		3			1868	1966	1971	Yes	Buckinghamshire Railway Centre	
Quorn and Woodhouse	52.7403°N 1.1878°W	Quorn		2			1899	1963	1974	No	Great Central Railway	

== R ==
Station name	Coordinates	Location	Height	Platforms	Arrivals and departures (if applicable)	Station information (if applicable)	Historic open date	Closed date(s)	Heritage station open date	Joint station?	Which system?	Gauge
Ramsbottom	53.6474°N 2.1346°W	Ramsbottom		2			1846	1972	1987	No	East Lancashire Railway	
Ravenstor	53.0903°N 1.5728°W	Wirksworth		1					2005	No	Ecclesbourne Valley Railway	
Rawtenstall	53.69883°N 2.29228°W	Rawtenstall		2			1846	1972	1991	No	East Lancashire Railway	
Rhiwfron	52.383658°N 3.868915°W	Rhiwfron		1			1902			No	Vale of Rheidol	
Rheidol Falls	52.3917°N 3.9003°W	Rheidol Falls		1			1903			No	Vale of Rheidol	
Rhyd Ddu	53.051444°N 4.133194°W	Rhyd Ddu					1881		2003	No	Welsh Highland Railway	
Rocky Valley Halt	53.0889°N 4.0838°W	Snowdon		1			1896			No	Snowdon Mountain Railway	
Rolvenden		Tenterden					1900	1954	1974	No	Kent and East Sussex Railway	
Romney Sands	50.959047°N 0.963109°E	Greatstone							1928	No	Romney, Hythe and Dymchurch Railway	
Ropley	51.087375°N 1.101105°W	Ropley					1865	1973	1977	No	Watercress Line	
Rothley	52.7048°N 1.1600°W	Rothley		2			1899	1963	1974	No	Great Central Railway	
Rowsley South	53.1746°N 1.6095°W	Rowsley		1					1997	No	Peak Rail	

== S ==
Station name	Coordinates	Location	Height	Platforms	Arrivals and departures (if applicable)	Station information (if applicable)	Historic open date	Closed date(s)	Heritage station open date	Joint station?	Which system?	Gauge
St Mary's Bay	51.011439°N 0.974546°E	St Mary's Bay							1927	No	RH&DR	
Scruton	54.319604°N 1.533628°W	Scruton					1848	1954	2014	No	Wensleydale Railway	
Sheffield Park	50.995642°N 0.001072°W	Fletching		2			1882	1958	1960	No	Bluebell Railway	
Shepherds Well		Shepherdswell		1			1916	1948	1993	No	East Kent Light Railway	
Sheringham		Sheringham		2			1887	1967	1975	No	North Norfolk Railway	
Shottle	53.0184°N 1.5474°W	Shottle		1			1867	1964	2014	No	Ecclesbourne Valley Railway	
Smallbrook Junction	50.711454°N 1.155077°W	South of Ryde			SAB	Station details	1991		1991	Yes	IoW and National Rail	
Snowdon Ranger	53.07375°N 4.143444°W	near Llyn Cwellyn, Snowdonia					1878	1936	2003	No	Welsh Highland	
Stogumber	51.1274°N 3.3722°W	Stogumber		1			1862	1971	1978	No	West Somerset	
Stonehenge Works		Leighton Buzzard		1						No	Leighton Buzzard Light Railway	
Summerseat	53.6275°N 2.3145°W	Summerseat		1			1846	1972	1987	No	East Lancashire Railway	
Summit	53.0680°N 4.0783°W	Snowdon		2			1896			No	Snowdon Mountain Railway	
Swanage		Swanage		2			1886	1972	1982	No	Swanage Railway	

== T ==
Station name	Coordinates	Location	Height	Platforms	Arrivals and departures (if applicable)	Station information (if applicable)	Historic open date	Closed date(s)	Heritage station open date	Joint station?	Which system?	Gauge
Tan-y-Bwlch	52.95439°N 4.01112°W	Tan-y-Bwlch					1873	1939	1958	No	Ffestiniog Railway	
Taw Valley halt	51.5916°N 1.8290°W	Near Swindon		1					2014	No	Swindon and Cricklade Railway	
Tenterden Town		Tenterden		1			1903	1954	1974	No	Kent and East Sussex Railway	
Toddington	51.9891°N 1.9281°W	Toddington		2			1904	1960	1984	No	Gloucestershire Warwickshire Railway	
Tunbridge Wells West		Tunbridge Wells					1866	1985	1996	No	Spa Valley Railway	

== U ==
Station name	Coordinates	Location	Height	Platforms	Arrivals and departures (if applicable)	Station information (if applicable)	Historic open date	Closed date(s)	Heritage station open date	Joint station?	Which system?	Gauge

== V ==
Station name	Coordinates	Location	Height	Platforms	Arrivals and departures (if applicable)	Station information (if applicable)	Historic open date	Closed date(s)	Heritage station open date	Joint station?	Which system?	Gauge

== W ==
Station name	Coordinates	Location	Height	Platforms	Arrivals and departures (if applicable)	Station information (if applicable)	Historic open date	Closed date(s)	Heritage station open date	Joint station?	Which system?	Gauge
Wallingford		Wallingford		1			1866	1959	1985	No	Cholsey and Wallingford Railway	
Wansford		Stibbington		3			1864	1957	1977	No	Nene Valley	
Washford	51.1618°N 3.3690°W	Old Cleeve		1			1874	1971	1976	No	West Somerset	
Watchet	51.1808°N 3.3301°W	Watchet		1			1862	1971	1976	No	West Somerset	
Waunfawr	53.1063°N 4.2017°W	Waunfawr					1877	1936	2000	No	Welsh Highland	
Weybourne		Weybourne		2			1887	1964	1975	No	North Norfolk Railway	
Whitby	54.4848°N 0.6149°W	Whitby			WTB	Station details	1836	n/a	2007	Yes	NYMR, National Rail	
Williton	51.1667°N 3.3092°W	Williton		2			1862	1971	1976	No	West Somerset	
Winchcombe	51.9664°N 1.9634°W	Winchcombe		2			1905	1964	1987	No	Gloucestershire Warwickshire Railway	
Wirksworth	53.0832°N 1.569°W	Wirksworth		3			1867	1947	2004	No	Ecclesbourne Valley	
Wittersham Road		Wittersham		1			1900	1954	1977	No	Kent and East Sussex Railway	
Woody Bay	51.2012°N 3.8859°W	Parracombe, Devon		2			1898	1935	2004	No	L&BR	
Wootton	50.71784°N 1.2428°W	Wootton Bridge		1			1875	1953	1970	No	IoW	

== X ==
Station name	Coordinates	Location	Height	Platforms	Arrivals and departures (if applicable)	Station information (if applicable)	Historic open date	Closed date(s)	Heritage station open date	Joint station?	Which system?	Gauge

== Y ==
Station name	Coordinates	Location	Height	Platforms	Arrivals and departures (if applicable)	Station information (if applicable)	Historic open date	Closed date(s)	Heritage station open date	Joint station?	Which system?	Gauge
Yarwell Junction		Yarwell		1					1977	No	Nene Valley	

== Z ==
Station name	Coordinates	Location	Height	Platforms	Arrivals and departures (if applicable)	Station information (if applicable)	Historic open date	Closed date(s)	Heritage station open date	Joint station?	Which system?	Gauge
