= Helmshore railway station =

English railway station from 1848 and 1966

Helmshore
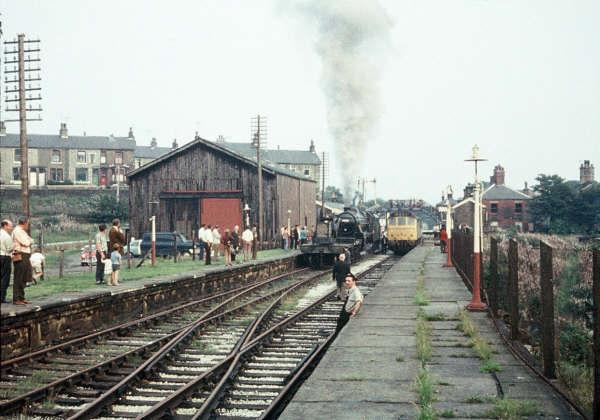
- Helmshore station from the north in 1970. Wooden goods depot at left centre, main station buildings at right centre. The diesel loco is in what was the Accrington-bound platform.

General information
- Location: Helmshore, Rossendale; England
- Coordinates: 53.6858°N 2.3327°W
- Grid reference: SD782210
- Platforms: 2

Other information
- Status: Disused

History
- Original company: East Lancashire Railway 1844-1859
- Pre-grouping: Lancashire and Yorkshire Railway
- Post-grouping: London, Midland and Scottish Railway

Key dates
- 1848: opened
- 1966: closed
Location

Helmshore railway station served the village of Helmshore, Rossendale, Lancashire between 1848 and 1966.

== Construction and location ==
Helmshore station was built by the East Lancashire Railway 1844-1859 (ELR) and opened on 17 August 1848. The ELR was merged with the Lancashire & Yorkshire Railway (LYR) on 13 May 1859 and this company operated the station until the merger into the London Midland & Scottish Railway (LMSR) in 1923.

The station was situated just north of where the line passed over Helmshore Road on a level crossing, a few hundred yards south of the town centre. The main station buildings were on the west side of the twin-track line with more modest buildings on the eastern platform, which served trains to Bury and Manchester Victoria. Also on the east side of the tracks was a siding to the wooden goods shed and longer sidings serving the nearby Albion cotton mill.

The signal box was located just south of Helmshore Road on the eastern side of the line and the signalman also operated the level crossing gates. A footbridge linked the south end of the platforms and allowed the public to cross the line whilst the gates were shut for trains to pass.

== Train services from Helmshore ==
The July 1922 timetable shows that the LYR operated 17 northbound and 18 southbound passenger trains that stopped at Helmshore each weekday. Most were through trains between Manchester, Accrington and Colne. In July 1946 the LMSR operated 15 northbound and 14 southbound trains, with the 8.28 a.m. service from Colne continuing via Bury, Manchester (Victoria) and Stockport (Edgeley) to London (Euston), arriving at 2.25 p.m.

By January 1956, British Railways London Midland Region were operating 15 stopping trains both north and southbound, with several trains beginning or terminating at Colne rather than Accrington. The 1956 single third class fare for the 17 miles to Manchester being 2s 8d (13p).

Diesel multiple units gradually took over from steam loco hauled trains from the later 1950s. The station was closed on 5 December 1966, with the last passenger train operating two days earlier.

=== Incidents ===
The Helmshore rail accident on 4 September 1860 saw 11 people killed and 77 injured when the rear portion of a Lancashire & Yorkshire Railway passenger excursion train became detached and ran back down the line where it collided with an on-coming passenger excursion train.

== East Lancashire Railway and the station site today ==
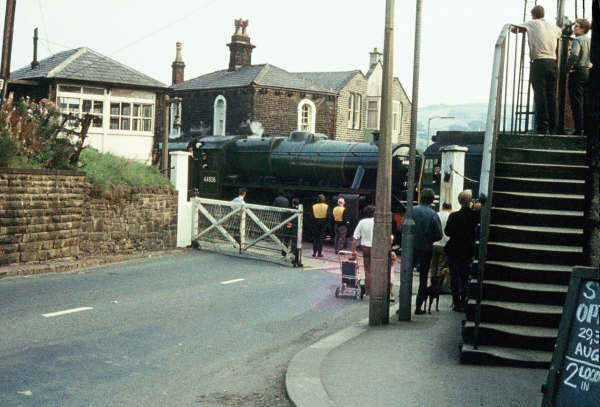
Helmshore railway station looking west along Helmshore Road with the signal box (left), level crossing (centre) and footbridge (right). Taken in 1970 during use by the ELR Preservation Society. Black Five 44806 is visible.

After the withdrawal of services on the line, the East Lancashire Railway Preservation Society leased the station site and a short length of the line from British Railways and moved some of their steam and diesel locomotives and rolling stock, including goods vans, to Helmshore.

After the society had operated their locomotives at the site for a period, the railway line between Bury, Ramsbottom and Rawtenstall became available, following cessation by British Railways of passenger services on 5 June 1972. The newly available length of line was judged to have more potential for the operation of regular steam train services, and the society therefore moved their operational base to Bury. The rail track at Helmshore was subsequently lifted.

Today, Station Road occupies part of the abandoned railway track north of the level crossing. The signal box has been converted to a dwelling house.

Preceding station	Disused railways	Following station
Haslingden; Line and station closed	Lancashire and Yorkshire Railway; East Lancashire Railway	Ramsbottom; Line open, station open
