= Stubbins =

Village in Lancashire, England

Coordinates: 53.657°N 2.316°W

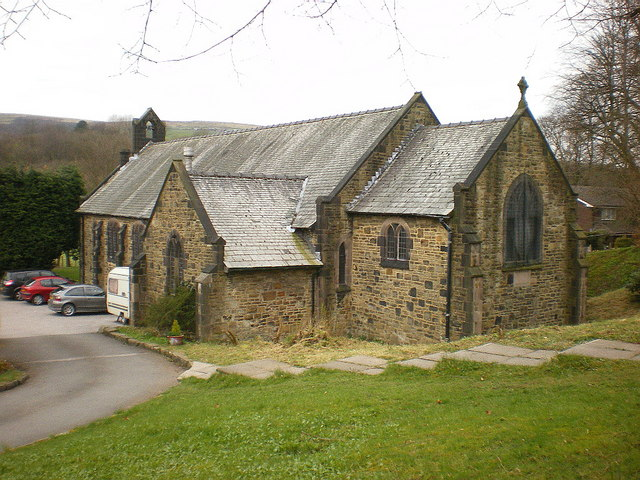
- St. Philip's Church in 2009

- Location within Rossendale Location within Lancashire
- OS grid reference: SD791179
- District: Rossendale
- Shire county: Lancashire
- Region: North West
- Country: England
- Sovereign state: United Kingdom
- Post town: BURY
- Postcode district: BL0
- Dialling code: 01706
- Police: Lancashire
- Fire: Lancashire
- Ambulance: North West
- UK Parliament: Rossendale and Darwen

Stubbins is an industrial village in the southern part of the Rossendale Valley, in Lancashire, England.

== Toponymy ==
Stubbing 1563. Old English meaning 'a place with tree stumps', implying a place from which many trees have been cleared.

== History ==
Stubbins has a long history; its name dates back to the Middle Ages when people were carving new farms out of the heavily wooded countryside. Like other communities in Rossendale, Stubbins grew in the Industrial Revolution. The change to an industrial village began towards the end of the 18th century, when a calico printworks was built on the site now occupied by Georgia-Pacific.

The 19th century owners of the printworks began to give the village its present shape by building rows of terraced houses for their workers. The other main employers were the Porritt family, who built Stubbins Vale Mill in 1851 and the Ramsbottom Spinning and Manufacturing Co., a co-operative of working men whose 1861 factory was christened Union Mill. Much of Stubbins Vale Mill was demolished in the 1970s, but the old weaving sheds were taken over as the administrative head office of TNT Express, the international carrier.

== Governance ==
For local government purposes, Stubbins receives services from Rossendale Borough Council and Lancashire County Council. Nearby is the small village of Chatterton and the hamlet Strongstry.

It is part of the Rossendale and Darwen constituency; Andy MacNae has been its Member of Parliament since 2024.

== Description ==
Much of the land to the west of the village is in the care of the National Trust and consists of hillside pasture and woodland leading up to Holcombe Moor and the Peel Tower.

The adjoining parkland at Chatterton was given to the people of the district of Ramsbottom as a peace memorial by the Porritt family. The village public house (now private offices, redeveloped in 2006), the Corner Pin, was originally the Railway Hotel, recalling the days when the village was still served by the railway. Col. A.T. Porritt gave much of the nearby countryside to the National Trust in memory of his son, Richard, who was killed during World War II.

== Transport ==
Stubbins railway station was served by a branch line, but was closed in 1972. The line is still used by the heritage East Lancashire Railway, which is now accessible from nearby Ramsbottom. Services between Rawtenstall, Bury Bolton Street and Heywood operate every weekend throughout the year, with additional services on some Wednesdays, Thursdays and Fridays between Easter and the end of September.

The village is sited half a mile north of Ramsbottom town centre, on the A676 between Bolton and Edenfield.
