= Bury Knowsley Street railway station =

Former railway station in Greater Manchester, England

Bury (Knowsley Street)
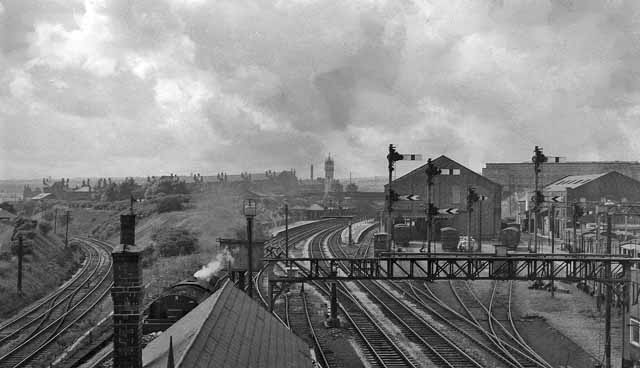
- The station in 1963

General information
- Location: Bury, Lancashire; England
- Coordinates: 53.58930°N 2.29916°W
- Grid reference: SD803103
- Platforms: 2

Other information
- Status: Disused

History
- Original company: Lancashire and Yorkshire Railway
- Pre-grouping: Lancashire and Yorkshire Railway
- Post-grouping: London Midland and Scottish Railway

Key dates
- 1 May 1848: Station opens as Bury
- February 1866: Renamed Bury Market Place
- 1888: Renamed Bury Knowsley Street
- 5 October 1970: Station closed
Location

Bury Knowsley Street was a railway station in Bury, Lancashire, England. It formerly served the town on the national railway network between 1848 and 1970.

== History ==
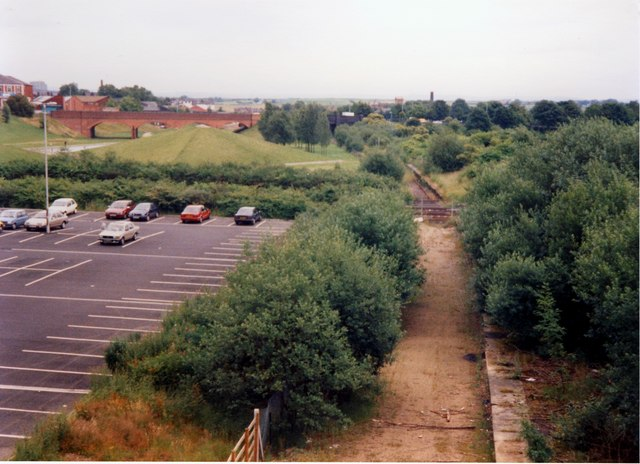
The remains of Knowsley Street railway station in 1988

The station was first opened by the Lancashire and Yorkshire Railway on 1 May 1848, as the eastern terminus of the Liverpool and Bury Railway; it was named simply Bury.

Services ran east to Heywood and Rochdale, and west to Bolton, Wigan Wallgate, Liverpool Exchange, Chorley and Preston. There was also a connection from here northwards to neighbouring Bolton Street station on the East Lancashire Railway line from Clifton Junction to Bacup and Accrington.

The station was renamed twice: to Bury Market Place in February 1866 and to Bury Knowsley Street in 1888.

The line and station were closed on 5 October 1970, as part of continuing cutbacks in British Rail services and the line west to Bolton was subsequently dismantled. The station buildings were demolished in the spring of 1971; the disused platforms survived until the early 1990s.

The line had stayed open to freight, along with the old ELR route to Rawtenstall, until December 1980; between March 1980 until final closure, it crossed what is now the Manchester Metrolink line to Bury Interchange on a flat crossing, though it was still operated by British Rail at that time.

Preceding station	Disused railways	Following station
Broadfield	Lancashire and Yorkshire Railway	Bury Bolton Street
Broadfield	Lancashire and Yorkshire Railway	Radcliffe Black Lane

=== Accidents ===
On 8 March 1912, John William Redfern was working at the station as a goods guard. Due to a "signaller error", two light engines collided with the goods train Redfern was guarding. The collision caused three of the goods wagons to derail and roll down the embankment; this accident led to Redfern dying of his injuries as well as injuring three others.

On 19 January 1952, the station footbridge collapsed under the weight of a large crowd entering the station following a football match. Two people were killed and 173 injured when the metal struts supporting the bridge's footway failed. No trains were in the station at the time. The accident report determined that, while the bridge's design was adequate, it had been inadequately maintained and the metal struts that failed had almost certainly required replacement for 10 or 15 years prior to the accident.

== The site today ==
There is now no physical trace of the station buildings. The line from Bury Bolton Street to Heywood runs through the station site; it was reopened in 2003 by the East Lancashire Railway.

In order to reopen the route, a bridge (with steep approach gradients on either side known locally as the "ski-jump") was constructed in the early 1990s and opened to traffic in July 2003 to carry the ELR line over the Metrolink; this now occupies the old station site.

The route towards Bolton is now overgrown and derelict and has been blocked at Bradley Fold by a housing development.
