= Summerseat =

Village in Greater Manchester, England

Coordinates: 53.630°N 2.309°W

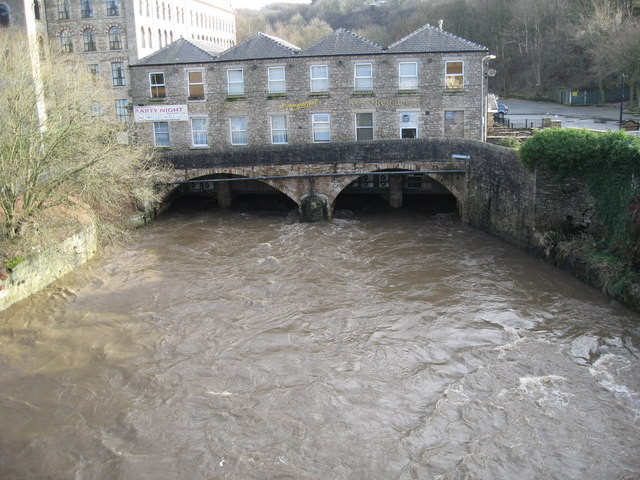
- The Waterside bar and restaurant in 2007; it was destroyed by floods in 2015

- Location within Greater Manchester
- OS grid reference: SD795145
- Metropolitan borough: Bury
- Metropolitan county: Greater Manchester
- Region: North West
- Country: England
- Sovereign state: United Kingdom
- Post town: BURY
- Postcode district: BL9
- Dialling code: 01706/01204
- Police: Greater Manchester
- Fire: Greater Manchester
- Ambulance: North West
- UK Parliament: Bury North

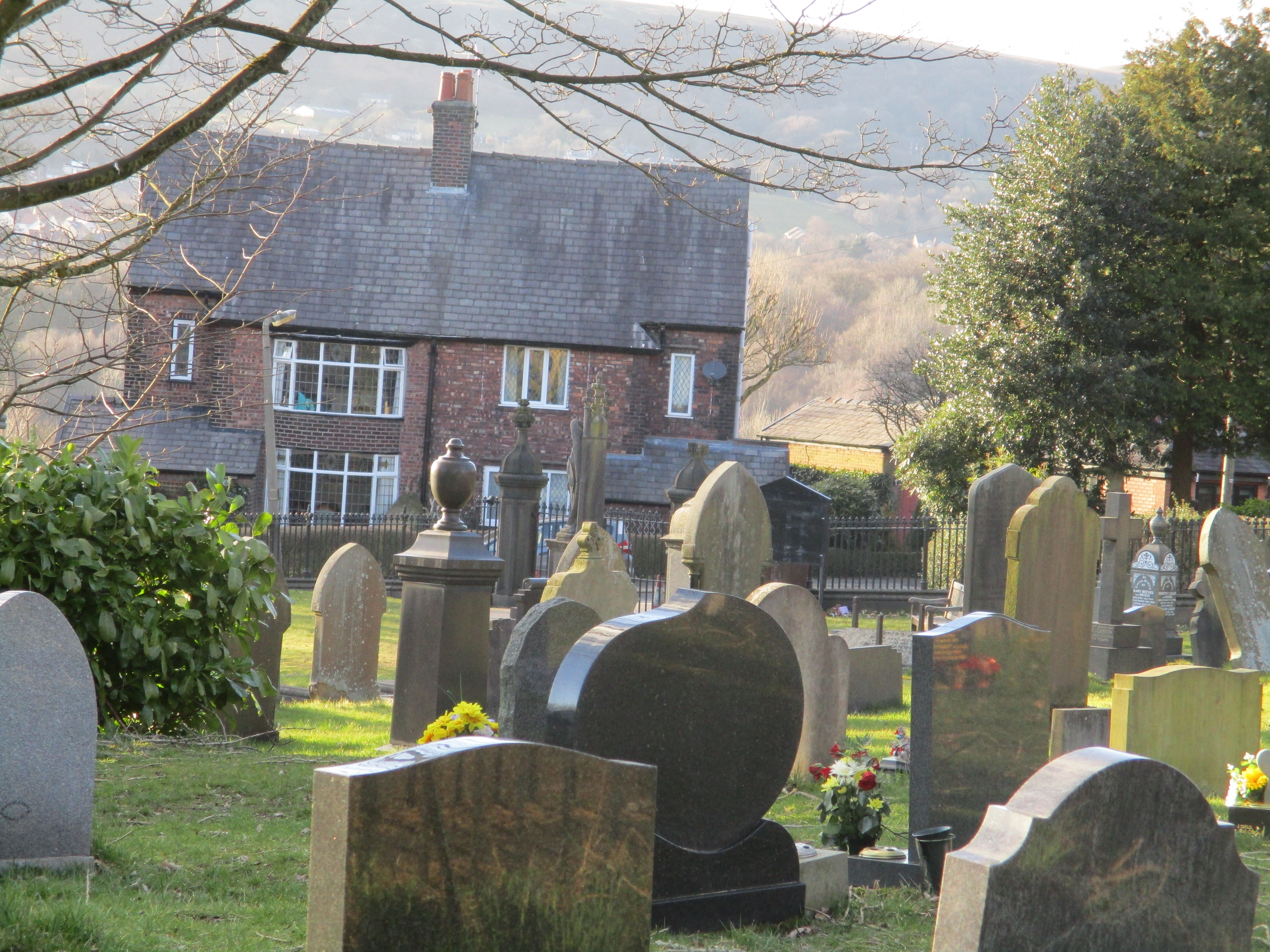
The graveyard by Rowlands Methodist Church

Summerseat is a village in the Metropolitan Borough of Bury, Greater Manchester, England; it is sited directly south of Ramsbottom.

== History ==
The 200-year-old Joshua Hoyles' cotton mill, a Grade II listed building, on the banks of the River Irwell, was redeveloped into residential apartments in the 1980s. The Waterside Inn, built on Kay Street Bridge, as a creche for the adjacent mill, was also to have been redeveloped, but collapsed during Storm Eva in December 2015. The bridge was also damaged, but it has since been rebuilt and the road across it is in use.

== Geography ==
Historically part of Lancashire, Summerseat lies in the Irwell Valley, on the course of the River Irwell to the north of Bury and along the route of the M66 motorway.

== Amenities ==
The village has a Costcutter store and two public houses: the Footballer's Inn and the Hamer's Arms.

== Transport ==
Summerseat railway station is a stop on the heritage East Lancashire Railway, which connects Haywood, Bury Bolton Street and Rawtenstall. It operates every weekend throughout the year, with additional services on some Wednesdays, Thursdays and Fridays between Easter and the end of September.
