= Summerseat railway station =

Heritage railway station in Greater Manchester, England

Summerseat
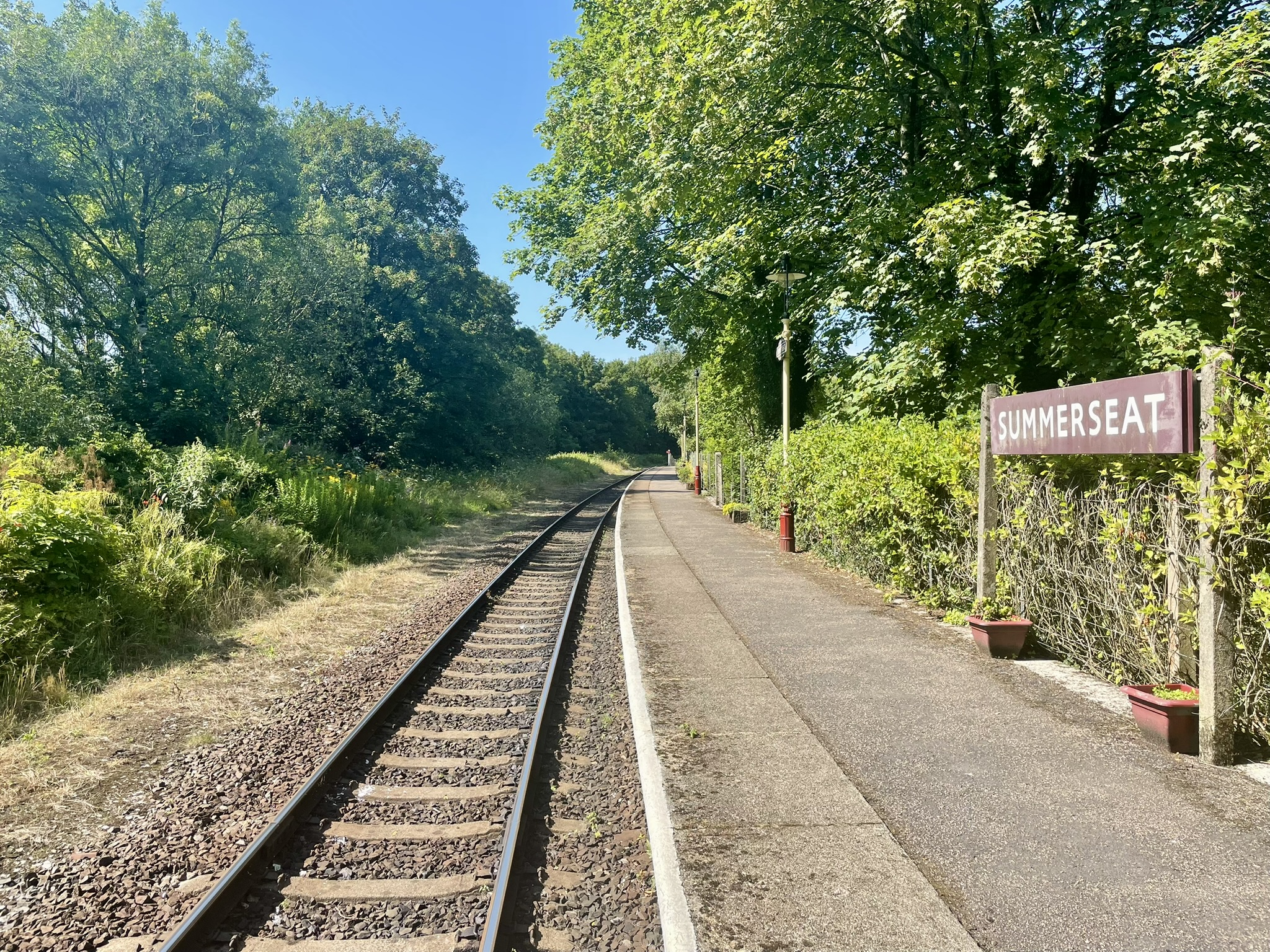
- Platform looking north in 2026

General information
- Location: Bury, Greater Manchester; England
- Coordinates: 53.6275°N 2.3145°W
- Grid reference: SD793146
- System: Station on heritage railway
- Manager: East Lancashire Railway
- Platforms: 1

Key dates
- 25 September 1846: Opened
- 5 June 1972: Closed
- 25 July 1987: Reopened
Location

Summerseat railway station serves the village of Summerseat, in Greater Manchester, England. It is a stop on the heritage East Lancashire Railway, which runs for 12 miles between Heywood and Rawtenstall.

== History ==
The station was built by the East Lancashire Railway and opened on 25 September 1846.

The line through Ramsbottom had initially been constructed by the Manchester, Bury and Rossendale Railway, authorised on 4 July 1844, but that company was absorbed by the East Lancashire Railway (ELR) on 21 July 1845. The line was completed from Clifton Junction through Bury Bolton Street and Ramsbottom to Rawtenstall, enabling through trains to operate from Manchester Victoria.

The line was extended by the ELR from Stubbins Junction, just north of Ramsbottom, to Accrington on 18 September 1848. In turn, the ELR was absorbed by the Lancashire & Yorkshire Railway (LYR) on 13 May 1859.

From 1923, the station was operated by the London Midland & Scottish Railway until nationalisation on 1 January 1948, when it came under the control of the London Midland Region of British Railways. It closed to passengers on 5 June 1972, although the line remained open for freight until 1980.

It was reopened by the East Lancashire Railway on 25 July 1987.

== Services ==
The East Lancashire Railway operates every weekend throughout the year, with additional services on Wednesdays, Thursdays and Fridays between Easter and the end of September.

Preceding station	Heritage railways	Following station
Ramsbottom towards Rawtenstall	East Lancashire Railway	Burrs Country Park towards Heywood
Disused railways
Ramsbottom	Lancashire and Yorkshire Railway; East Lancashire Railway	Bury Bolton Street
