= Stubbins railway station =

Disused railway station in Lancashire, England

Stubbins
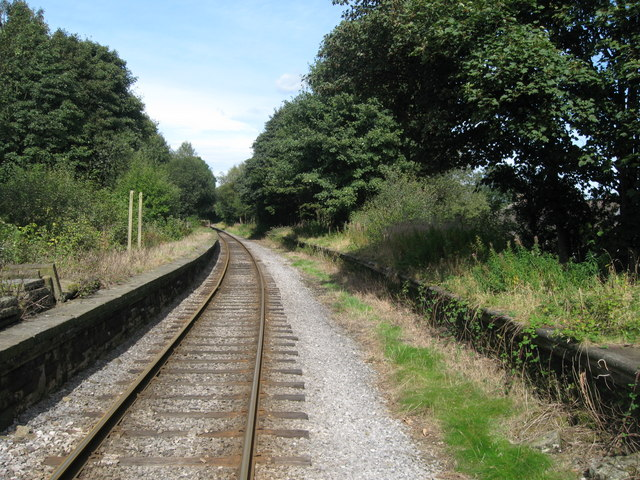
- Stubbins railway station

General information
- Location: Stubbins, Rossendale; England
- Coordinates: 53.6580°N 2.3168°W
- Grid reference: SD791180
- Platforms: 2

Other information
- Status: Disused

History
- Original company: East Lancashire Railway
- Pre-grouping: Lancashire and Yorkshire Railway
- Post-grouping: London, Midland and Scottish Railway

Key dates
- January 1847: station opened
- 5 June 1972: station closed
Location

Stubbins railway station served the village of Stubbins, in Rossendale, Lancashire, England.

== History ==
The station was opened by the East Lancashire Railway in 1847, on their line between Bury Bolton Street and Rossendale. It was situated next to the junction of the lines toward Accrington and to Rawtenstall and Bacup, but only had platforms on the latter route.

It was closed to passengers in 1972, when the Bury to Rawtenstall service was withdrawn by British Rail, although the line through it remained open for coal traffic until December 1980.

Preceding station	Disused railways	Following station
Ramsbottom; Line and station open	Lancashire and Yorkshire Railway; East Lancashire Railway	Ewood Bridge and Edenfield; Line open, station closed

== The site today ==
The East Lancashire Railway has since reopened the line as a heritage railway, but the station here has not been reinstated. The platforms remain in situ and trains pass through the station.
