= Ewood Bridge and Edenfield railway station =

Railway station in Lancashire, England

Ewood Bridge and Edenfield
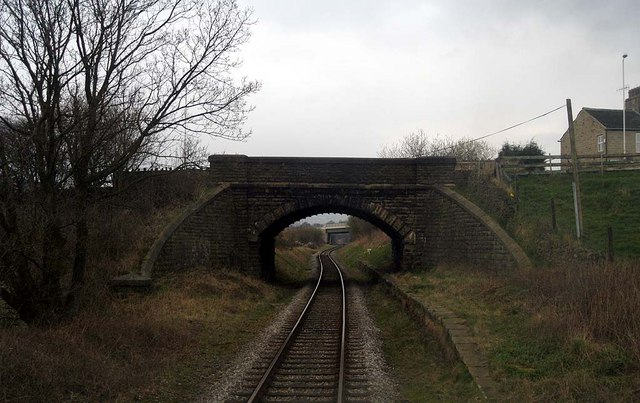
- This is the now disused Ewood Bridge and Edenfield railway station that closed in 1972 on the now preserved East Lancashire Railway. The bridge over the railway is the B6527 road.

General information
- Location: Ewood Bridge, Rossendale, Lancashire; England
- Coordinates: 53.6832°N 2.3088°W
- Grid reference: SD796207
- Platforms: 2

Other information
- Status: Disused

History
- Original company: East Lancashire Railway 1844-1859
- Pre-grouping: Lancashire and Yorkshire Railway
- Post-grouping: London, Midland and Scottish Railway

Key dates
- 1846: opened
- 5 June 1972: closed
Location

Ewood Bridge and Edenfield railway station served the village of Edenfield, Rossendale, Lancashire.

== History ==
On 25 September 1916, a 179-metre (587 ft) long German military Zeppelin airship flew over the area, attempting to inflict damage on the transport system. It dropped bombs on Ewood Bridge station which was destroyed.

The last train called on 3 June 1972. The line was later reopened by the preserved East Lancashire Railway using a new (and replacement) station, Irwell Vale just south of the old site of Ewood Bridge.

Preceding station	Disused railways	Following station
Stubbins	Lancashire and Yorkshire Railway; Rawtenstall to Bacup Line	Rawtenstall
