= Burrs Country Park =

Country park in Greater Manchester, England

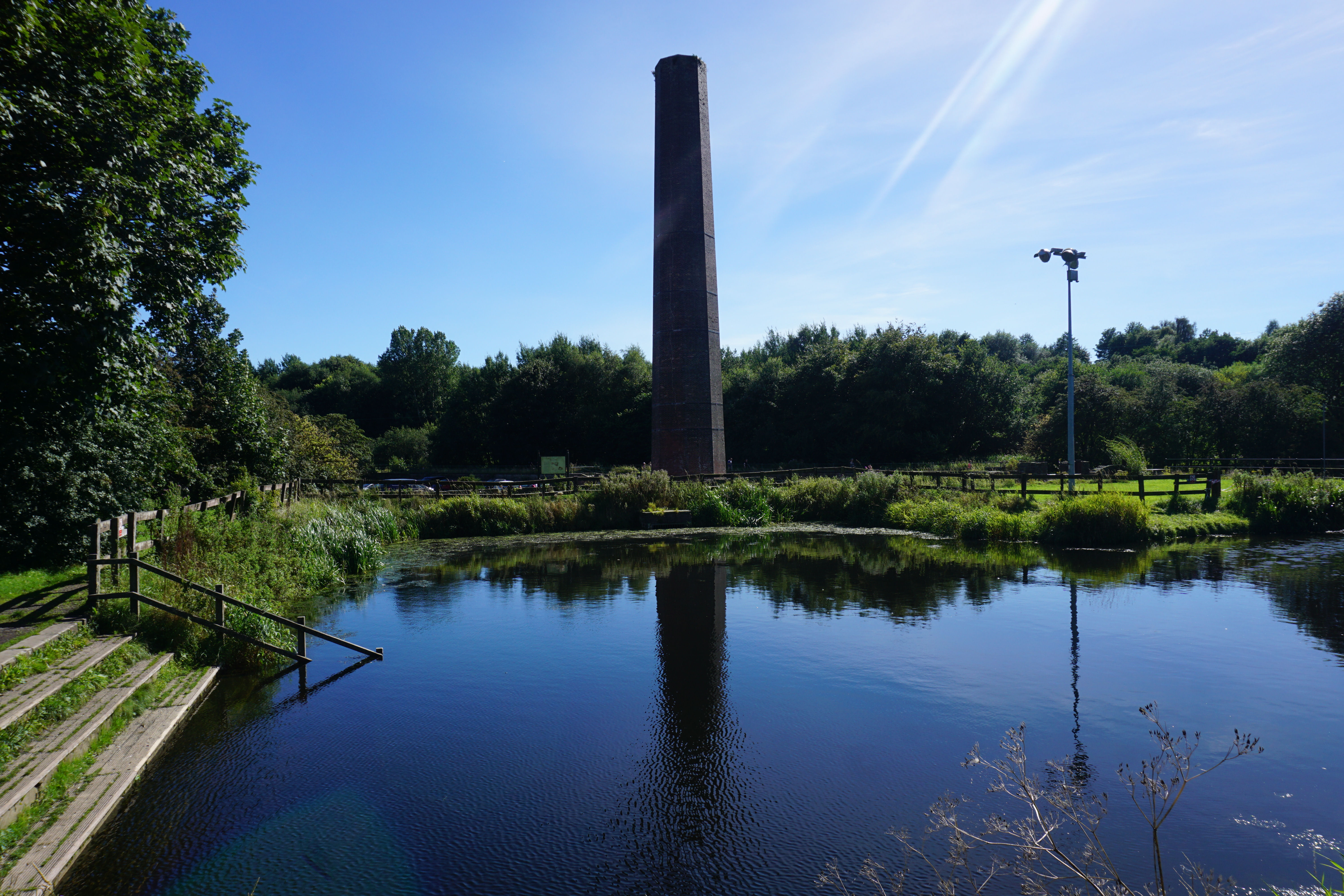
- Interactive map of Burrs Country Park
- Type: Public and industrial heritage park
- Location: Bury, Greater Manchester
- Coordinates: 53.608593°N 2.304844°W
- Area: 36 hectares (89 acres)
- Created: 1989
- Operator: Bury Metropolitan Borough Council
- Open: All year

Burrs Country Park covers a 36 hectares (89 acres) site on the banks of the River Irwell, in the north of the town of Bury, Greater Manchester, England.

== History ==
It was acquired by Bury Metropolitan Borough Council (Bury MBC) in 1986 and transformed from a derelict industrial site into a modern country park.

The park covers an area once housing the mill complex of the Burr and Higher Woodhill cotton mills. The old mill remains were in the main removed from the site with certain features of interest left in situ; these include the Burrs Mill chimney, the mill floor and water wheel pit.

== Description ==
The park contains the feeder canal for Elton Reservoir, which is the source of water for the Manchester, Bolton and Bury Canal.

The site is on the Irwell Sculpture Trail and has three sculptures: "Waterwheel" by David Kemp, "Stone Cycle" by Julie Edwards and "Picnic Area" by David Fryer.

The site is also home to the Bury Agricultural Society Show Ground, which moved here in 2001 following the loss of the Bury Show Ground. Bury MBC have a limited Countryside Warden service office located in a mill old cottage on Stock Street. It has been awarded Green Flag accreditation for 2007/08. and a Much Loved award as part of Fields in Trust's UK's Best Park competition.

== Leisure activities ==
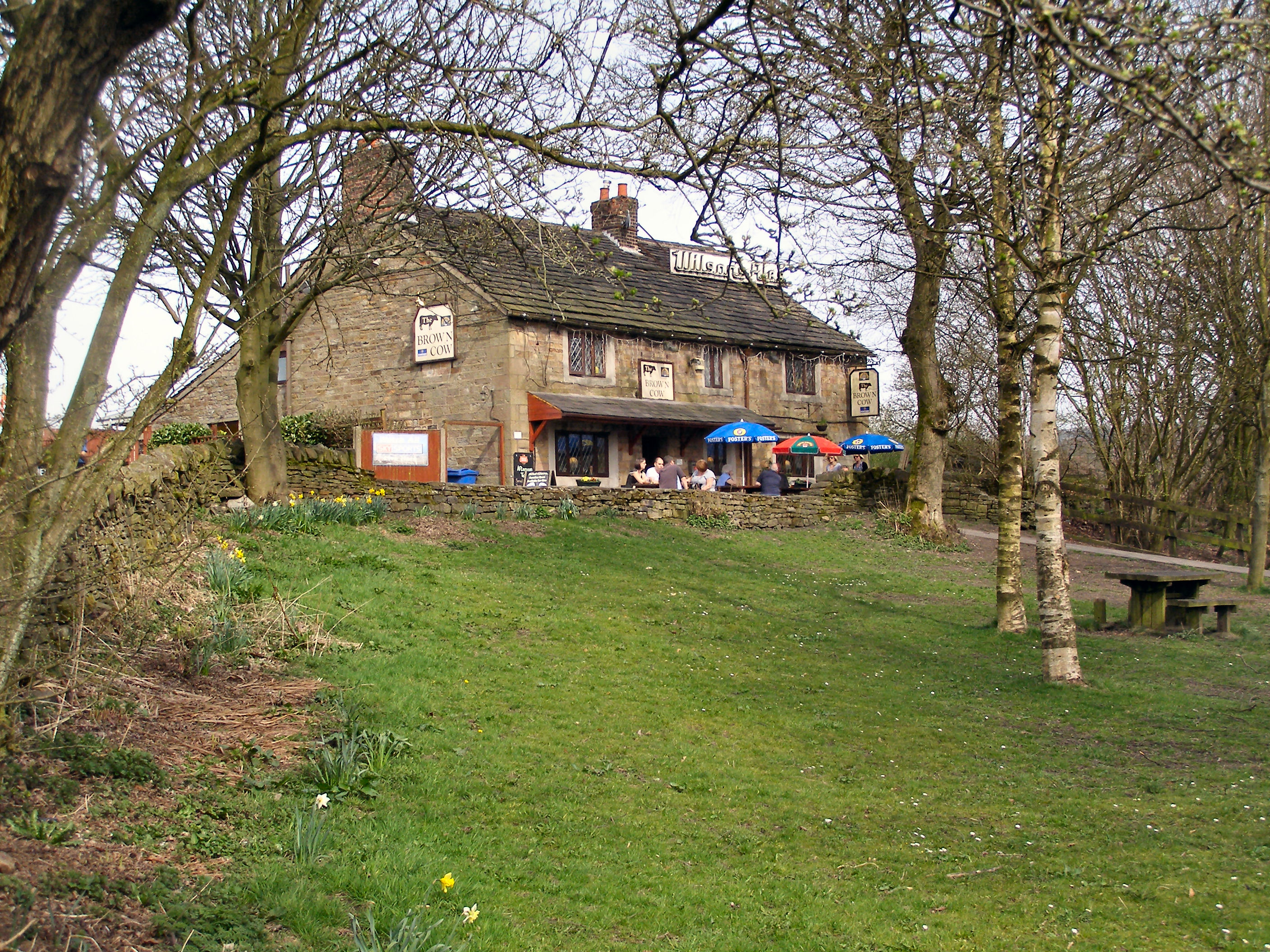
The Brown Cow pub within the park

The site facilitates a range of leisure activities, including:

- The Sunnywood Project, based in Stock Street, is a non-profit outdoor education and events provider.
- The Irwell Sculpture Trail runs through the park
- Outdoor pursuits, including walking and orienteering trails
- Industrial archaeology: interpretation boards explain the history of the mills and cottages
- Canoeing: a training pool and slalom course. The long-established Bury Canoe Club is based at Burrs.
- Fishing, by licence only
- Birdwatching: resident herons, dippers and kingfishers
- Cycling (lies on the National Cycle Route 6)
- Playground
- Caravanning: The Caravan and Motorhome Club has a purpose built camping and caravan site.
- Nature study: woodland, wetland and open space habitats
- Friends of Burrs Country Park: The group is a collection of local residents and park users, who are passionate about Burrs Country Park. The group carries out fundraising and practical park improvement projects, including a gardening club, balsam bashing and litter picking
- Picnic tables
- The Lamppost Café
- The Brown Cow public house.

== Transport ==
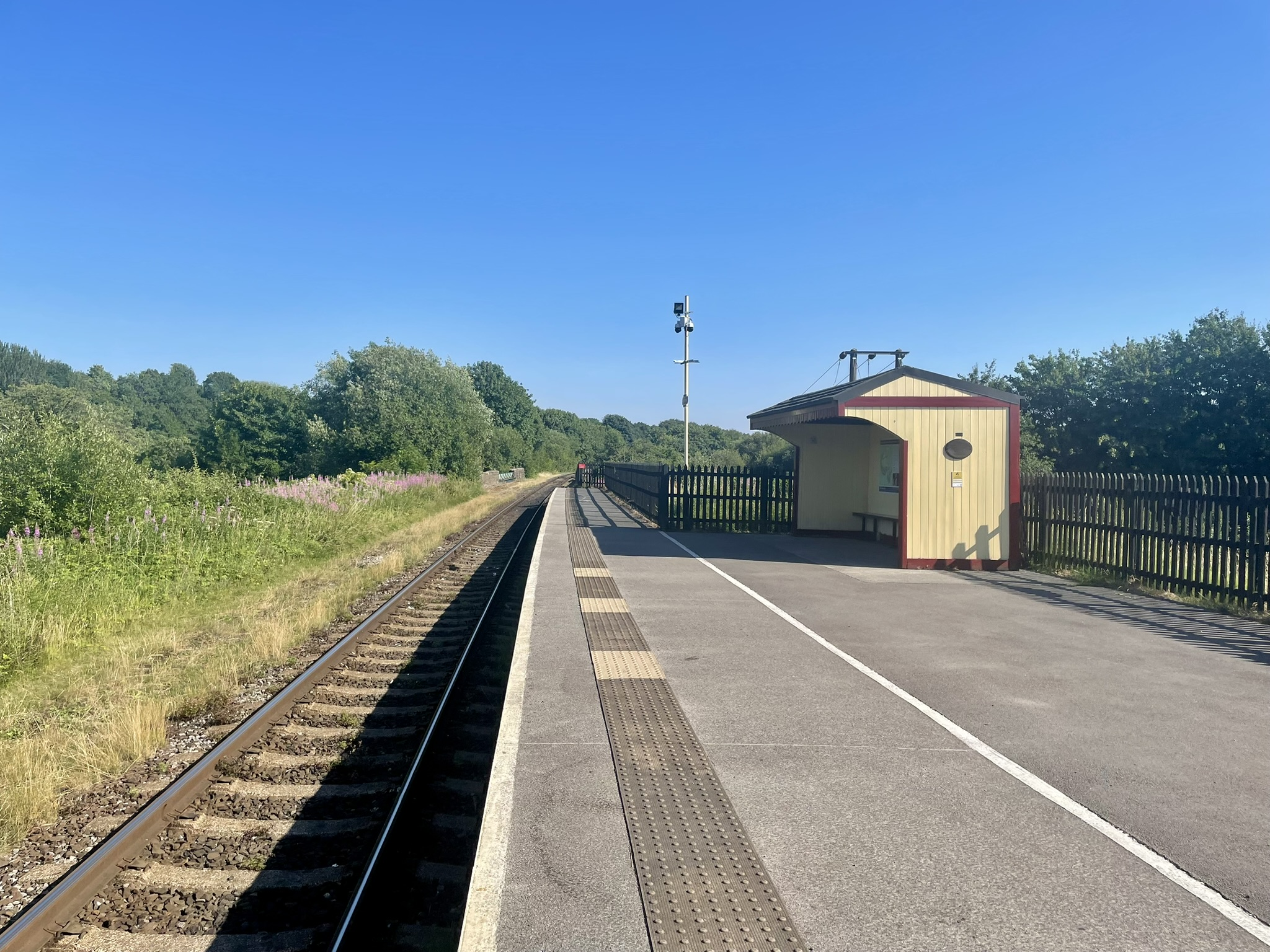
Burrs Country Park heritage railway station

The park lies on several bus routes from Bury town centre, including routes 472, 474 and 477 from Bury Interchange operated by Go North West and Stagecoach Manchester.

Burrs Country Park railway station, a stop on the heritage East Lancashire Railway, is sited close to the park and was opened on 1 January 2017. Trains operate every weekend throughout the year, with additional services on some Wednesdays, Thursdays and Fridays between Easter and the end of September.

The park is easily accessible:

- By car or bicycle from Bury Bridge on the A58
- By footpaths leading from the suburbs of Brandlesholme to the west and Walmersley, Seedfield and Limefield to the east.

== Guides and information ==
Bury MBC provides several guides to the area, including the Irwell Sculpture Trail, wildlife, fishing and industrial heritage.
