= Haslingden railway station =

Former railway station in Lancashire, England

Haslingden
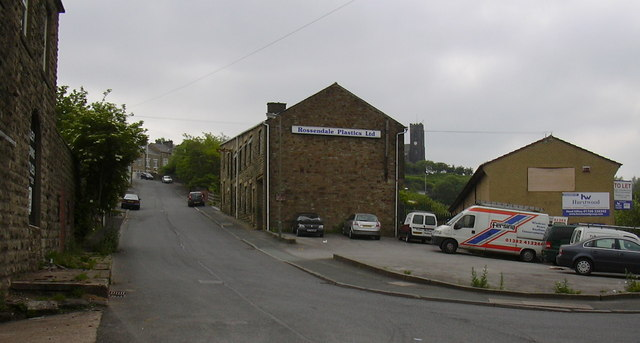
- Station Road (June 2007)

General information
- Location: Haslingden, Borough of Rossendale, England
- Coordinates: 53.7111°N 2.3272°W
- Grid reference: SD785238
- Platforms: 2

Other information
- Status: Disused

History
- Original company: East Lancashire Railway 1844-1859
- Pre-grouping: Lancashire and Yorkshire Railway
- Post-grouping: London, Midland and Scottish Railway

Key dates
- 17 August 1848: Opened
- 7 November 1960: Closed
Location

Haslingden railway station served the town of Haslingden, in the borough of Rossendale, Lancashire, England, between 1848 and 1960.

== History ==
The station was built by the East Lancashire Railway (ELR) on their Bury Bolton Street to Accrington line and was opened on 17 August 1848.

In 1859, the ELR was incorporated into the Lancashire and Yorkshire Railway, which operated it until 1923 when it became part of the London Midland and Scottish Railway. Owned by the London Midland Region of British Railways from 1948, it was closed on 7 November 1960. The route through the station closed on 5 December 1966 and the tracks were subsequently lifted.

Preceding station	Disused railways	Following station
Baxenden	Lancashire and Yorkshire Railway; East Lancashire Railway	Helmshore

== The site today ==
The A56 Haslingden by-pass now occupies the trackbed and where the station stood; it was built in 1980.
