= Burrs Country Park railway station =

Heritage railway station in Greater Manchester, England

Burrs Country Park
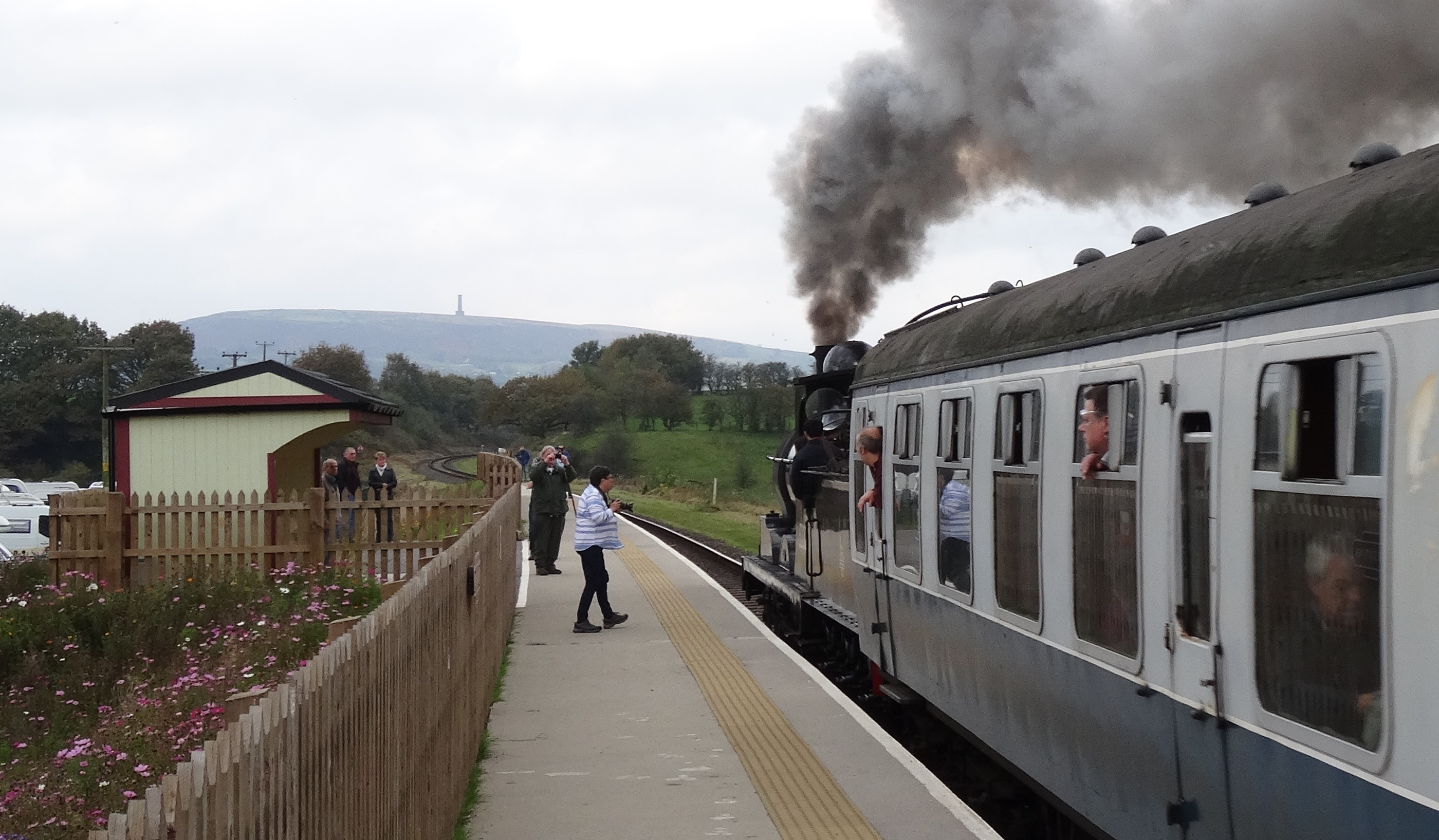
- L&YR Class 27 52322 passes during the Autumn Steam Gala in October 2017

General information
- Location: Bury, Greater Manchester; England
- Coordinates: 53.6108°N 2.30376°W
- System: Station on heritage railway
- Manager: East Lancashire Railway
- Platforms: 1

History
- Opened: 2016
Location

Burrs Country Park railway station is a stop on the heritage East Lancashire Railway. It is sited close to the 36 hectare (86 acre) Burrs Country Park site, on the banks of the River Irwell, in the town of Bury, Greater Manchester, England.

== History ==
The area of Burrs Country Park was acquired by the Metropolitan Borough of Bury in 1986 and was transformed from a derelict industrial site into a modern country park.

The station was opened in October 2016, with regular passenger services commencing in January 2017.

== Service ==
The East Lancashire Railway operates every weekend throughout the year, with additional services on some Wednesdays, Thursdays and Fridays between Easter and the end of September.

Preceding station	Heritage railways	Following station
Summerseat towards Rawtenstall	East Lancashire Railway	Bury Bolton Street towards Heywood
