= Irwell Vale =

Village in Lancashire, England

Coordinates: 53.676°N 2.315°W

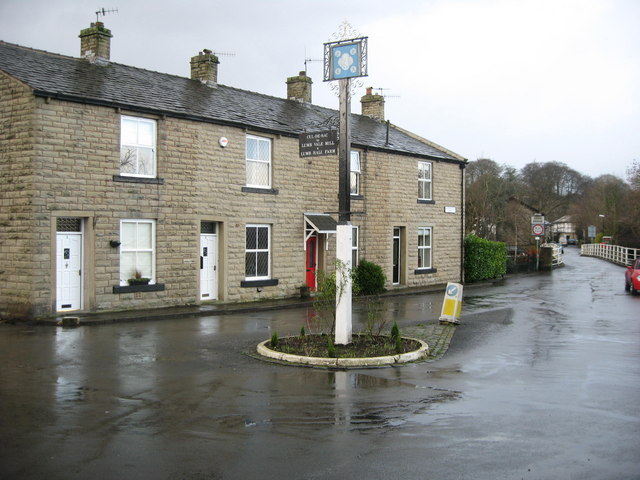
- Irwell Vale

- Location within Rossendale Location within Lancashire
- OS grid reference: SD791200
- District: Rossendale
- Shire county: Lancashire
- Region: North West
- Country: England
- Sovereign state: United Kingdom
- Post town: Bury
- Postcode district: BL0
- Dialling code: 01706
- Police: Lancashire
- Fire: Lancashire
- Ambulance: North West
- UK Parliament: Rossendale and Darwen

Irwell Vale is a village within the Rossendale borough of Lancashire, in North West England. which lies at the confluence of the River Ogden and River Irwell.

The village is bounded to the south by Edenfield, Ramsbottom and Stubbins; to the west by Holcombe and to the north Haslingden and Rawtenstall. There is a railway station at Irwell Vale on the East Lancashire Railway that is open to the public on weekends, public holidays and services stop Wednesday, Thursday & Friday during spring and summer. This preserved heritage railway runs diesel and steam services through the year with main stopping points at Rawtenstall, Ramsbottom, Bury and Heywood. Irwell Vale railway station is between Ramsbottom and Rawtenstall.
