= Ramsbottom railway station =

Heritage railway station in Greater Manchester, England

Ramsbottom
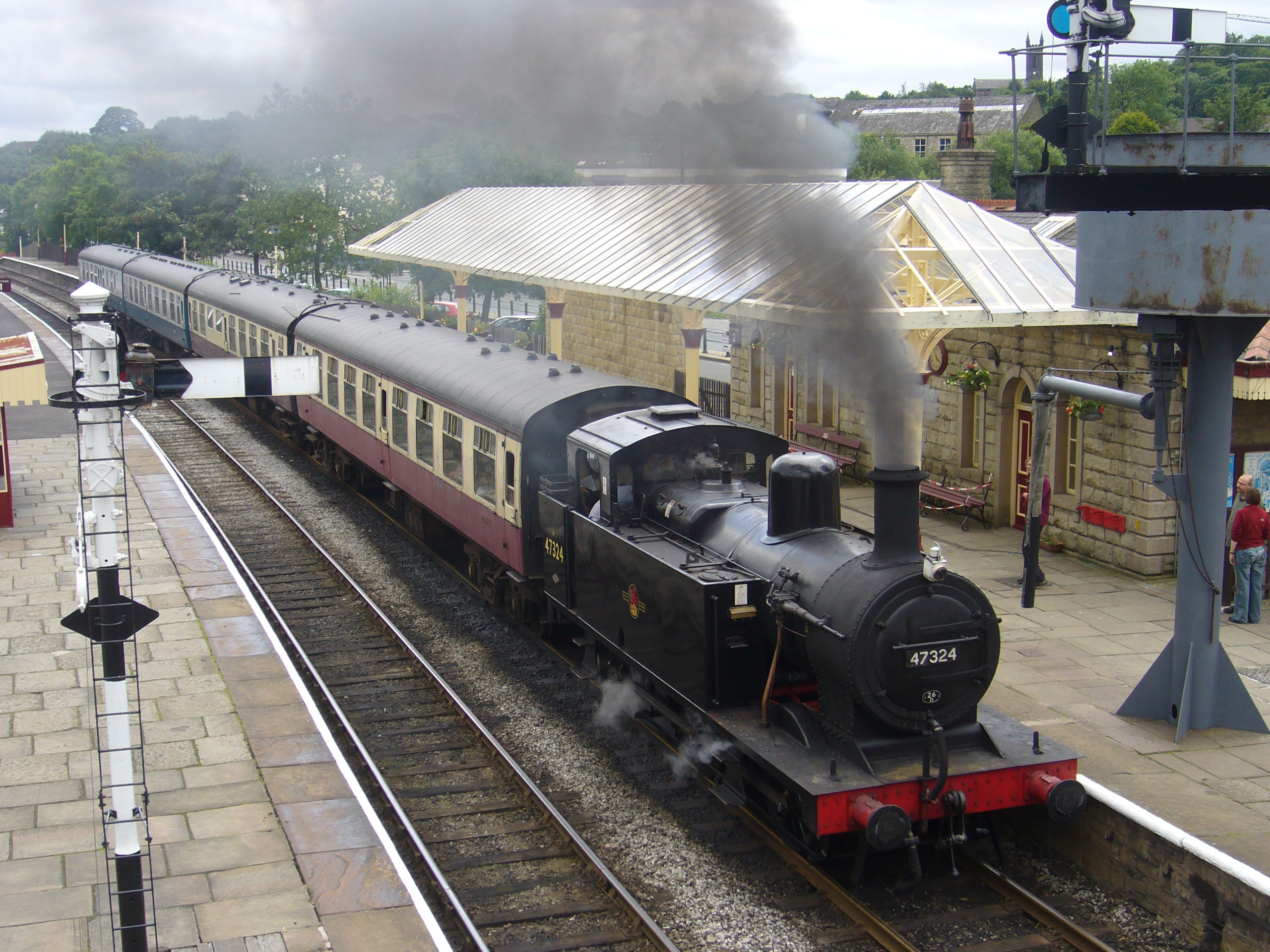
- The station viewed from the footbridge.

General information
- Location: Ramsbottom, Bury; England
- Coordinates: 53.6474°N 2.3146°W
- Grid reference: SD792167
- System: Station on heritage railway
- Manager: East Lancashire Railway
- Platforms: 2

Key dates
- 1846: Opened
- 1972: Closed
- 1987: Reopened
Location

Ramsbottom railway station serves the town of Ramsbottom, in Greater Manchester, England. It is a stop on the heritage East Lancashire Railway.

== History ==
The station was built by the East Lancashire Railway and opened on 28 September 1846.

The line through Ramsbottom had initially been constructed by the Manchester, Bury and Rossendale Railway, authorised on 4 July 1844, but that company was absorbed by the East Lancashire Railway (ELR) on 21 July 1845. The line was completed from Clifton Junction through Bury Bolton Street and Ramsbottom to Rawtenstall, enabling through trains to operate from Manchester Victoria.

The line was extended by the ELR from Stubbins Junction, just north of Ramsbottom, to Accrington on 18 September 1848. In turn, the ELR was absorbed by the Lancashire & Yorkshire Railway (LYR) on 13 May 1859.

The station was provided with up and down platforms linked by a footbridge, canopies, and a station building on the down side. A goods yard and goods shed was located on the site of the present car park. The level crossing and signal box still remain in something like their original condition.

Extensive sidings were placed north of the crossing. Those on the down side were largely used for coal traffic, but the ones opposite constituted extensive sorting sidings. Other goods sidings served Trinity Paper works on the east side of the station, and the Square Print Works on the south west side. The latter had a private internal rail system worked by a locomotive called 'Archibald'.

From 1923, the station was operated by the London Midland & Scottish Railway until nationalisation on 1 January 1948, when it came under the control of the London Midland Region of British Railways. The station was rationalised from the late 1960s, bringing the demolition of the station buildings and up platform (used by trains towards Bury). It finally closed to passengers on 5 June 1972, although the line remained open for freight until 1980.

It was reopened by the East Lancashire Railway on 25 July 1987.

== Facilities ==
The station has retained both platforms, the up platform having been rebuilt by the ELR since the initial reopening. They are connected by a footbridge, which was moved here from Dinting railway station. A station building containing a ticket office and waiting room has been rebuilt on platform 2.

Between 2006 and 2007, an L&YR pattern canopy was erected on this platform, providing a covered area next to the station building. On platform 1, a small waiting shelter is provided. The level crossing remains at the north end of the platforms and retains its wooden gates, which are worked by the traditional 'ship's wheel' in the adjacent signal box.

== Services ==
The East Lancashire Railway operates every weekend throughout the year, with additional services on Wednesdays, Thursdays and Fridays between Easter and the end of September.

Preceding station	Heritage railways	Following station
Irwell Vale towards Rawtenstall	East Lancashire Railway	Summerseat towards Heywood
Historical railways
Stubbins; Line open, station closed	Lancashire and Yorkshire Railway; East Lancashire Railway	Summerseat; Line and station open
Disused railways
Helmshore; Line and station closed	Lancashire and Yorkshire Railway; East Lancashire Railway	Summerseat; Line and station open

== Gallery ==
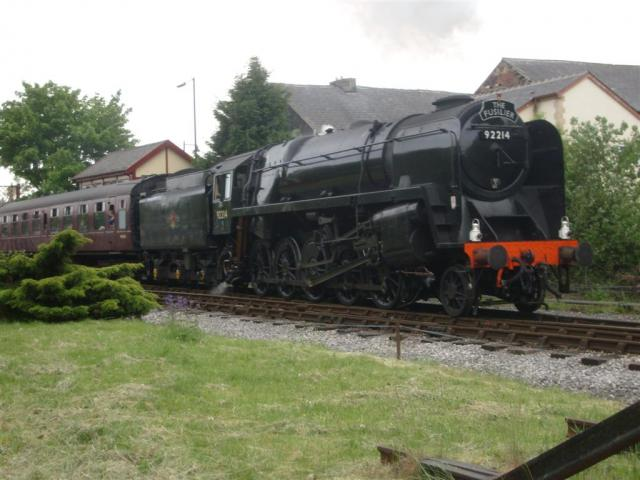
92214 at Ramsbottom railway station on the East Lancashire Railway.

1987 interior view of Ramsbottom railway station signal box, as inherited from British Rail after closure of the line.

2009 interior view of Ramsbottom railway station signal box after restoration.

Ramsbottom level crossing gates being opened to road traffic after the passage of a train.
