= Irwell Vale railway station =

Heritage railway station in Lancashire, England

Irwell Vale
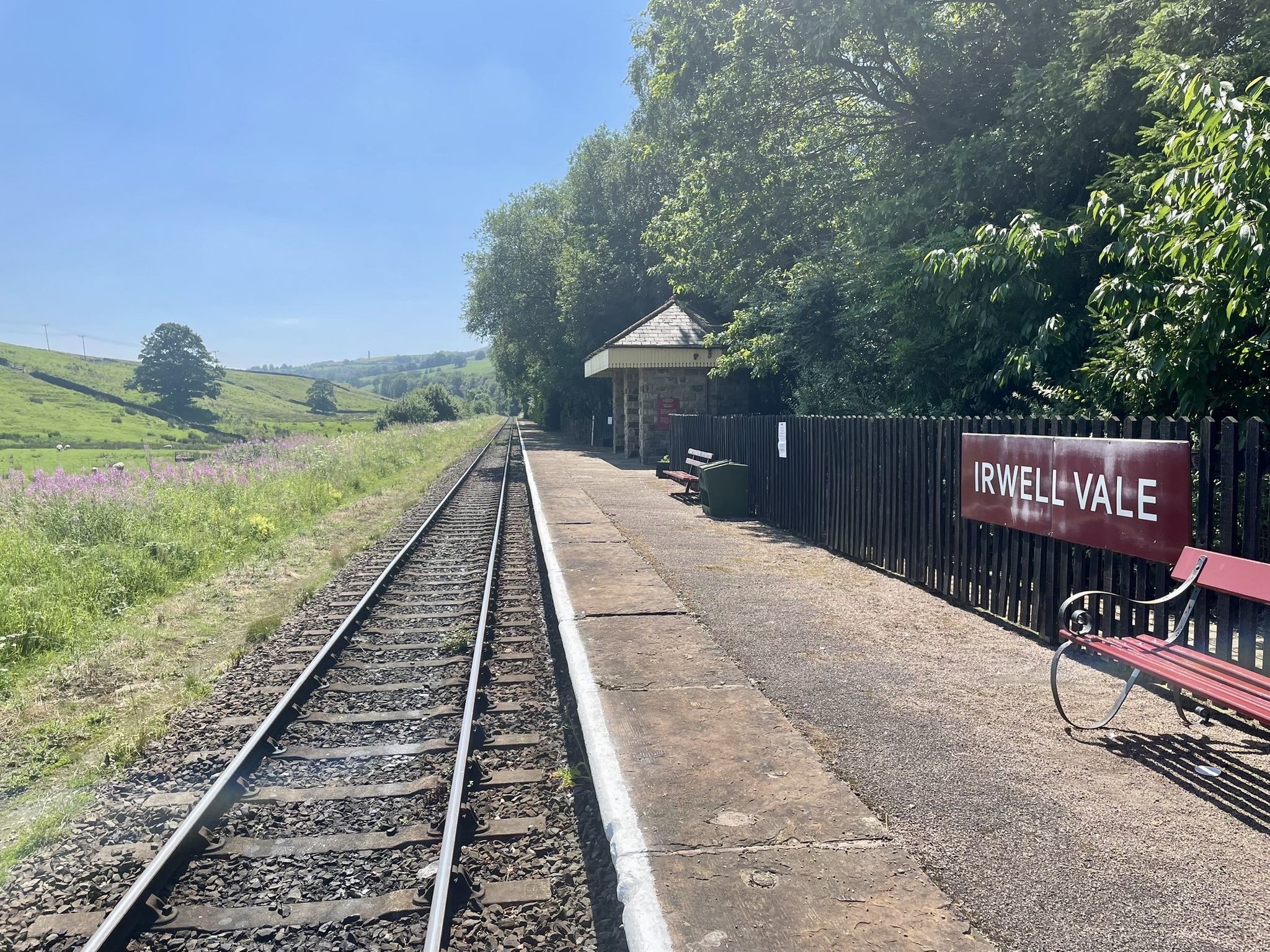

General information
- Location: Rossendale; England
- Coordinates: 53.67689°N 2.31599°W
- Grid reference: SD792201
- System: Station on heritage railway
- Manager: East Lancashire Railway
- Platforms: 1

History
- Opened: 1991
Location

Irwell Vale railway station was built as a stop on the heritage East Lancashire Railway. It serves the small village of Irwell Vale, in Rossendale, Lancashire, England.

== History ==
Irwell Vale was built by the East Lancashire Railway, in connection with the local authority. It opened in 1991.

== Facilities ==
The station has its own parking facilities. A nearby level crossing providing access to houses on the nearby Hardsough Road; it features the original warning sign, listing a telephone number with an area code prior to the Phone Day introduction of the "01" prefix.

Access on foot is effected by a small subway.

== Services ==
The East Lancashire Railway operates every weekend throughout the year, with additional services on Wednesdays, Thursdays and Fridays between Easter and the end of September.

Preceding station	Heritage railways	Following station
Rawtenstall Terminus	East Lancashire Railway	Ramsbottom towards Heywood
