= East Lancashire Railway =

Heritage railway in north-west England

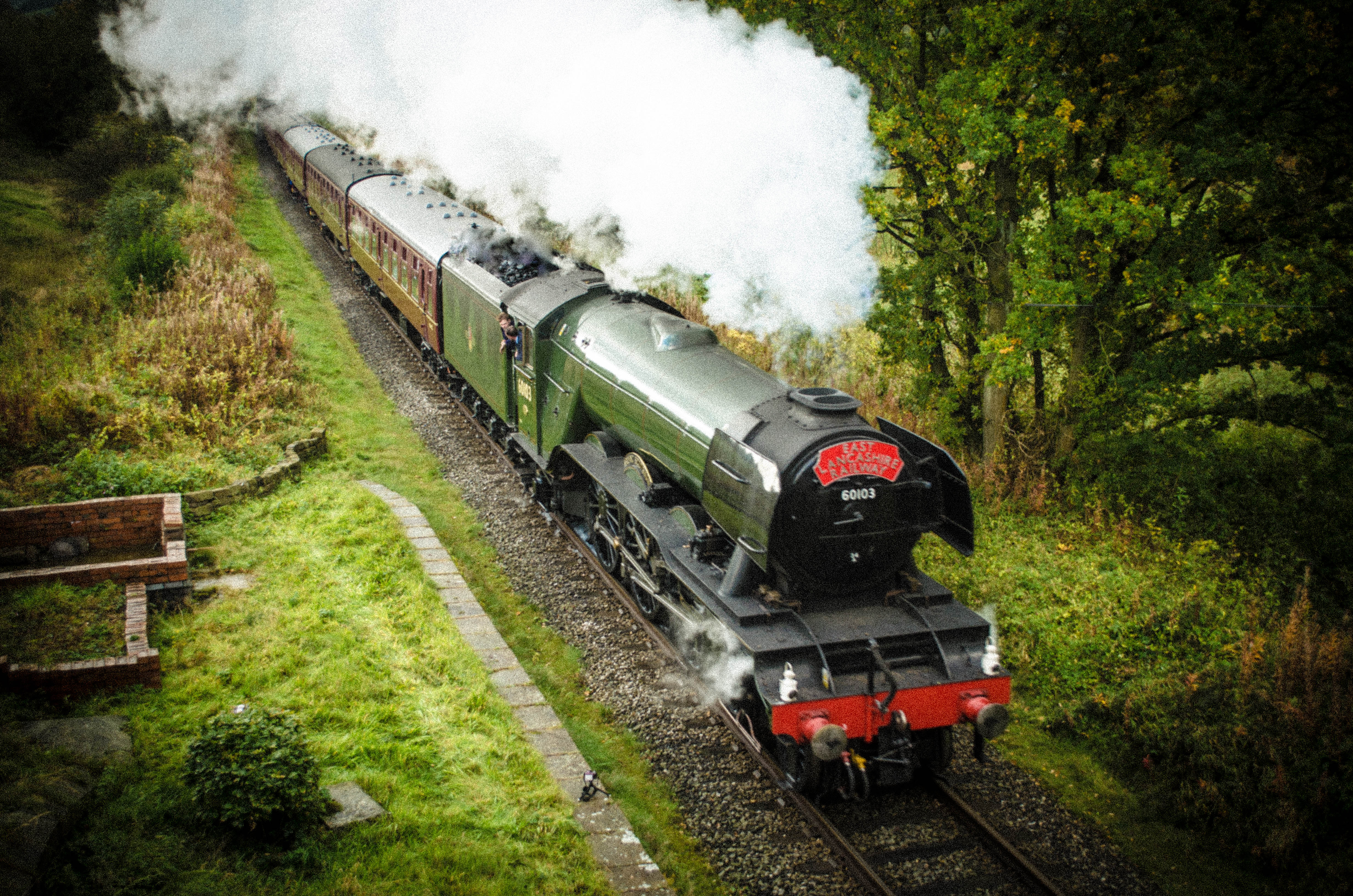
- 60103 Flying Scotsman at Blackburn Road bridge, Ewood Bridge, heading towards Rawtenstall in 2016
- Locale: North west England
- Terminus: Rawtenstall and Heywood
- Connections: Network Rail (east of Heywood, via Castleton); Manchester Metrolink (south of Bury)

Commercial operations
- Name: East Lancashire Railway
- Built by: East Lancashire Railway (1844–1859)
- Original gauge: 4 ft 8 1/2 in (1,435 mm) standard gauge

Preserved operations
- Operated by: East Lancashire Light Railway Company (ELLR Co.)
- Stations: 7
- Length: 12 miles 45 chains (20.2 km)
- Preserved gauge: 4 ft 8 1/2 in (1,435 mm) standard gauge

Commercial history
- Opened: 1846
- Closed: 17 March 1980

Preservation history
- 31 March 1986: Granted light railway order (for public service)
- 25 July 1987: Re-opens and public service begins
- 27 April 1991: Extension to Rawtenstall
- 6 September 2003: Extension to Heywood
- 13 October 2016: New halt opened at Burrs Country Park
- Headquarters: Bury Bolton Street
Route map
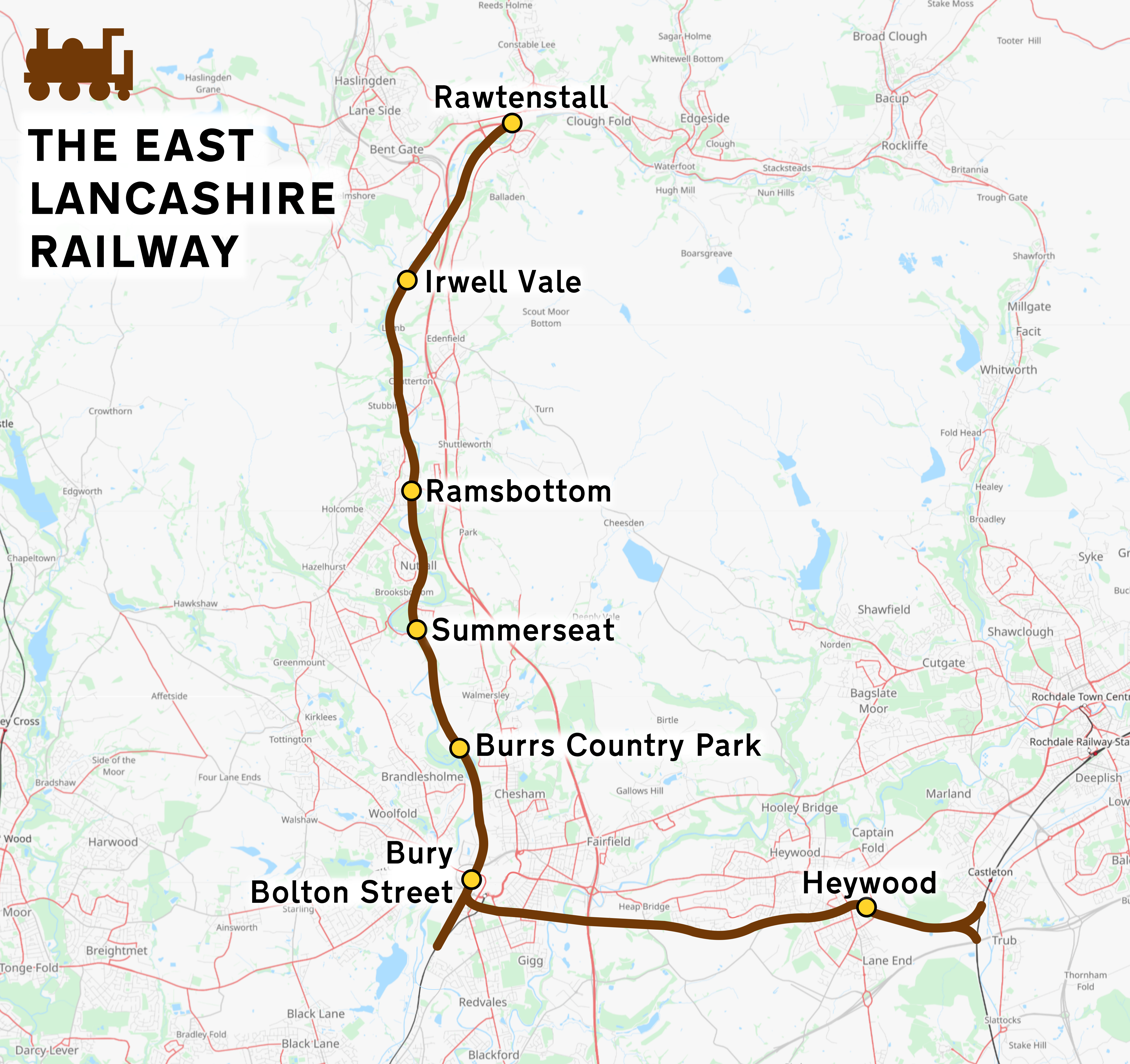
- (Click to expand)

The East Lancashire Railway (ELR) is a twelve-and-a-half-mile (20 km) heritage railway line in North West England which runs between Heywood, Greater Manchester, and Rawtenstall, Lancashire. There are intermediate stations at Bury Bolton Street, Burrs Country Park, Summerseat and Ramsbottom, with the line crossing the border into Rossendale serving Irwell Vale and Rawtenstall. Before closure, the line terminated at Bacup.

The heritage line is now just over 12 miles (19 km) long and has a mainline connection with the national railway network at Castleton, just beyond Heywood. The ELR is planning to extend the running line to Castleton in the future.

== Overview ==
Passenger services between Bury and Rawtenstall were withdrawn by British Rail on 3 June 1972. Coal services to Rawtenstall ended in 1980 and formal closure of the line followed in 1982. The East Lancashire Railway Trust reopened the line on 25 July 1987. The initial service operated between Bury and Ramsbottom, via Summerseat. In 1991, the service was extended northwards from Ramsbottom to reach Rawtenstall, via Irwell Vale. However, two original stations on the line, closed to passengers by BR in 1972, have not reopened, Ewood Bridge & Edenfield and Stubbins. The latter was the junction of the lines to Accrington and Rossendale although there were no platforms serving these lines.

Rawtenstall is the practical northern limit of the line, as the formation on towards Bacup has been lost immediately north of the station.

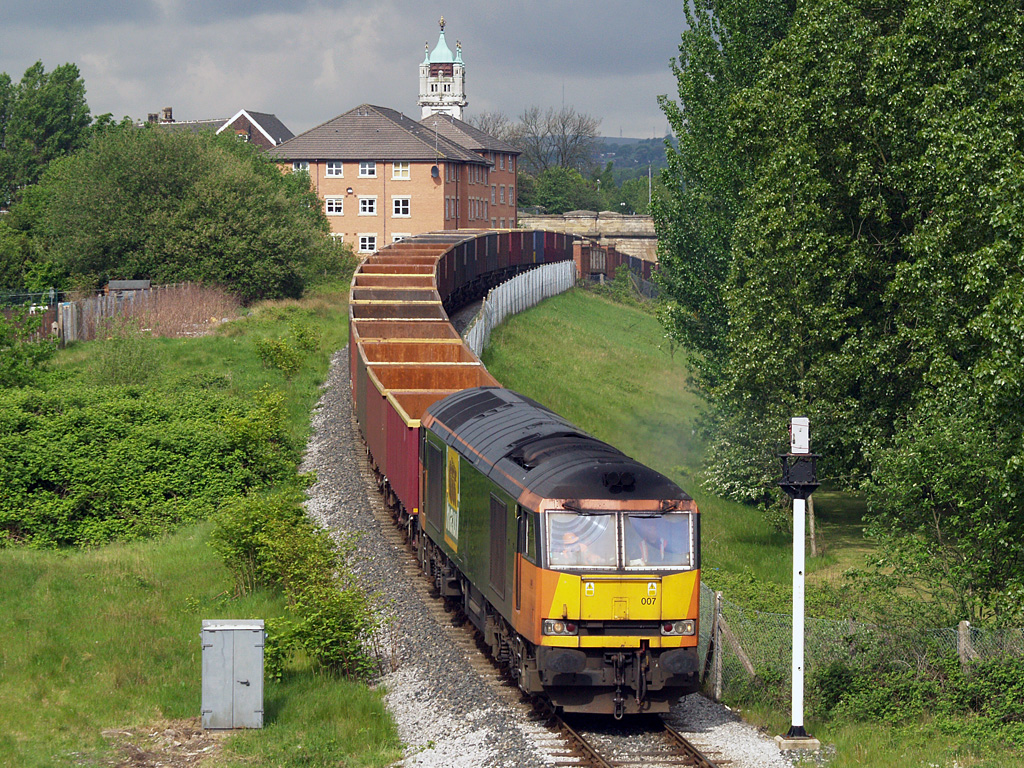
Freight train passing over the "Ski Jump" bridge, 2007

In September 2003, an eastbound extension from Bury to Heywood was re-opened. To reach Heywood, the extension had to cross over the Manchester Metrolink line to Bury, at the site of the former Bury Knowsley Street station. This necessitated the construction of a new intersection bridge, with steeply graded approaches of 1 in 36 (27.8‰) and 1 in 41 (24.4‰) nicknamed The Ski Jump.

On 13 October 2016, the new Burrs Country Park station was officially opened by the Mayor of Bury, where locomotive no. 4472 Flying Scotsman pulled the first train to stop at the station with a bagpipe rendition of 'Scotland the Brave' signalling its arrival.

The remainder of the extension includes a long section at 1 in 85 (11.8‰), rising towards Heywood, as the heritage railway line climbs out of the Irwell valley.

The railway is open every weekend of the year, holding a number of themed events and galas throughout the year, which include steam and diesel events, and also offers driver experience courses. The Day Out with Thomas events made a return to the railway after a two-year absence, following fresh negotiations, having previously been unable to reach an agreement in 2009 with HIT Entertainment, the owners of the Thomas brand. While Thomas was absent, the ELR operated Family Engines Big Day Out events featuring alternative engines with faces, such as Jimmy the Jinty.

The railway is run by volunteer members from the East Lancashire Railway Preservation Society (ELRPS). The railway is well known for its collection of diesel locomotives which reside on the railway, along with over 140 carriages, wagons and utility vehicles. Although the ELR does offer a local residents' discount card, and many residents do use the trains at weekends, it does not claim to offer a true commuter service either in levels of services or fares.

== Railway stations of the ELR ==
| Point | Coordinates (Links to map resources) | OS Grid Ref | Notes |
|---|---|---|---|
| Castleton | 53.5919°N 2.1783°W | SD88291060 | Network Rail |
| Heywood | 53.5889°N 2.2069°W | SD86401027 | |
| Broadfield | 53.5863°N 2.2302°W | SD84850999 | Closed |
| Bury Knowsley Street | 53.5893°N 2.2991°W | SD80291034 | Closed |
| Bury Bolton Street | 53.5934°N 2.2997°W | SD80261080 | |
| Burrs Country Park | 53.6108°N 2.3038°W | SD79991273 | |
| Summerseat | 53.6275°N 2.3145°W | SD79291459 | |
| Ramsbottom | 53.6474°N 2.3146°W | SD79301681 | |
| Stubbins | 53.6580°N 2.3168°W | SD79161799 | Closed |
| Irwell Vale | 53.6769°N 2.3160°W | SD79222009 | |
| Ewood Bridge and Edenfield | 53.6832°N 2.3088°W | SD79702079 | Closed |
| Rawtenstall | 53.6988°N 2.2923°W | SD80792252 | |

== Reinstatement proposals ==
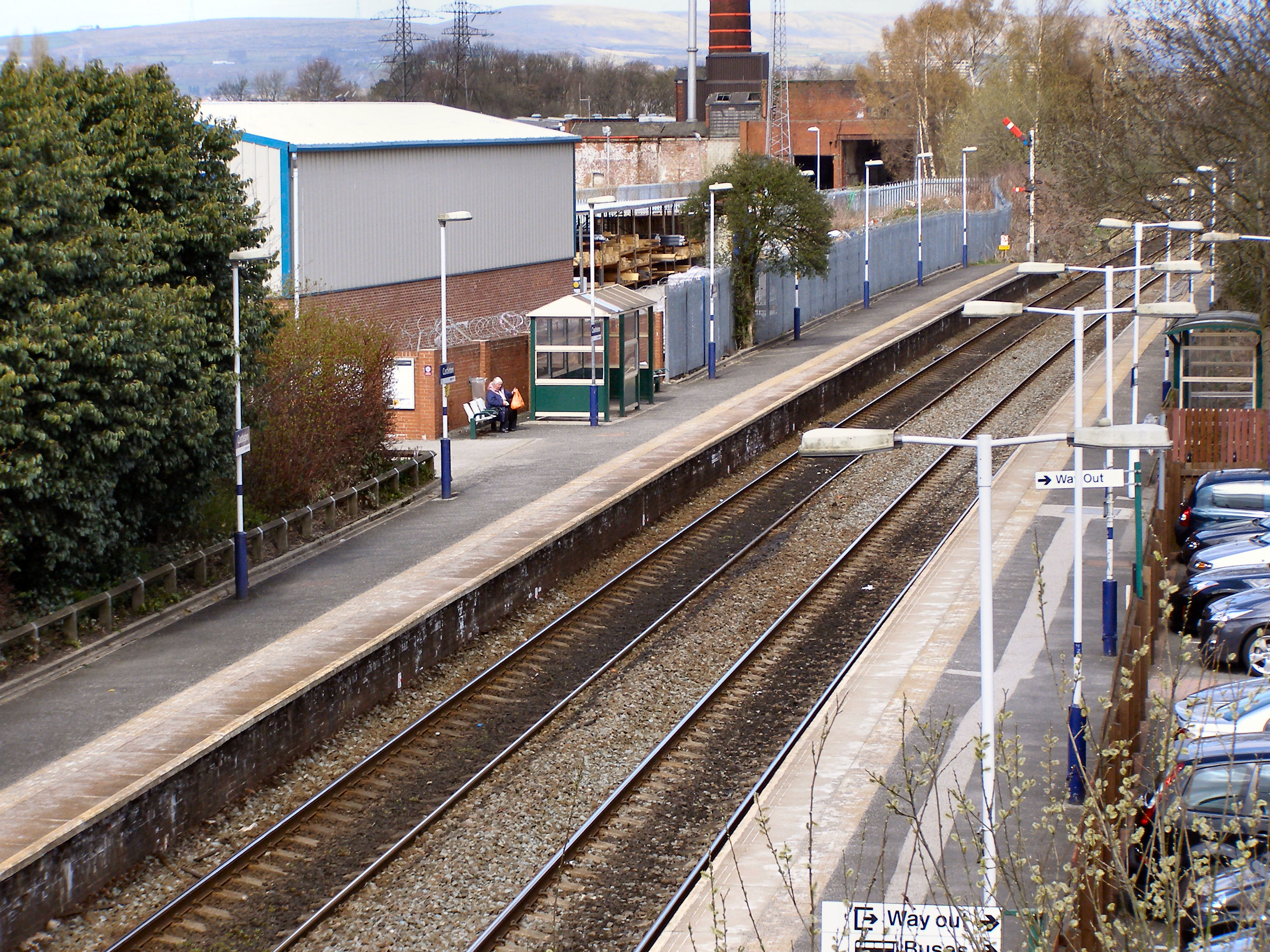
Castleton railway station, the terminus of the ELR's extension plans, 2010

The heritage line is now just over 12 miles (19 km) long and has a mainline connection with the national railway network at Castleton, just beyond Heywood. The ELR is planning to extend the running line to Castleton in the future, with a new cross platform interchange being the preferred option.

As of 2014 options for providing an interchange station at Castleton between East Lancashire Railway and National Rail services were being explored. Plans for the station were supported by Rochdale Borough Council, which hoped to fund it by adjacent land development.

In 2019, the CityMetric website published a "fantasy" tram link expansion proposal to create an orbital extension to the Manchester Metrolink tram system, which would include part of the current East Lancashire Railway route between Bury and Heywood.

In January 2019, Campaign for Better Transport released a report identifying the line which was listed as Priority 2 for reopening. Priority 2 is for those lines which require further development or a change in circumstances (such as housing developments).

As part of the government's 'Restoring Your Railway' fund, the route between Rochdale railway station and Bury Bolton Street ELR station was identified as a route for re-opening. As of 23 May 2020, the bid had made it past the first stage of the 'ideas fund'.

== Cultural references ==
In October 2014, Ramsbottom Station and the adjacent level crossing on Bridge Street was featured in the 2017 movie A Monster Calls, which was the scene for an emotional peak in the movie, starring Sigourney Weaver in a Volvo estate car waiting for a BR DMU, in Rail Blue livery, to pass through the crossing.

In the 1990s, the railway was featured in the 1991 film Let Him Have It and in the finale of ITV's comedy series The Grimleys, named The Grimley Curse set in 1978. In 2007, during the finale of BBC One's award-winning drama series Life on Mars, set in 1973, a class 47 was used for scenes of an armed robbery at Brooksbottom Tunnel.

The railway also featured in an episode of Coronation Street, transmitted on August Bank Holiday 2010, when Hayley and Roy Cropper travelled to their wedding aboard an ELR train of Mark 1 coaches hauled by LMS "Black 5" No. 44871, which carried 45407's Lancashire Fusilier nameplates for the occasion. The line also starred in the BBC television film Eric and Ernie, aired on New Year's Day 2011, about the early career of the British comedy act Morecambe and Wise. Bury Bolton Street station was featured, along with a train of Mark 1 coaches hauled by LMS "Black 5" No. 44871. In 2014, the railway was featured in a week of episodes of Hollyoaks (broadcast 3–7 November) which featured a crash involving BR Class 14 no. D9531 "Ernest".

== Volunteer dismissal controversy ==
In April 2023, the railway was subject to national press coverage for dismissing a female volunteer following her complaint about misogynistic behaviour and discriminatory treatment. The volunteer had been shortlisted as Inspirational Woman of the Year at the 2023 Railway Awards ceremony hosted by the Heritage Railway Association for her work as a heritage railway steam locomotive fireman with Llangollen Railway. The volunteer stated, "the actions of the ELR are the very reason why culture needs to change". The company denied unfair treatment.

== Locomotives and multiple units ==
The ELR is home to a mixed collection of small to large designs, some of which are main-line certified. These often visit other heritage lines or can be found operating mainline excursions, especially during the summer season (March–October).

=== Steam locomotives ===
==== Operational ====
| Number & Name | Type | Photograph | Livery | Notes |
|---|---|---|---|---|
| BR 34081 92 Squadron | SR Battle of Britain 4-6-2 | | SR Malachite Green | Moved from the Nene Valley Railway in 2024 |
| BR 34092 City of Wells | SR West Country 4-6-2 | | BR Brunswick Green | Moved from the Keighley and Worth Valley Railway in 2017 |
| BR 80097 | BR Standard Class 4 2-6-4T | | BR Lined Black, Early Emblem | Built in 1954 at Brighton Works. Recently undergone restoration from scrapyard condition, running in commenced in October 2018 and returned to service for the first time in preservation in early 2019. |
| MSC No. 32 "Gothenburg" | Hudswell Clarke 0-6-0T | | NWR Blue | Built in 1903 for the Manchester Ship Canal. Hauled the first train on the ELR in 1987. Currently painted blue to represent Thomas the Tank Engine. |

==== Visitors ====
| Number & Name | Type | Photograph | Livery | Notes |
|---|---|---|---|---|
| BR 51456 (L&YR 752) | L&YR Class 23 0-6-0ST | | BR Unlined Black, Early Emblem | Built in 1881. Recently returned to service following overhaul at Baron Street Works for its owners the "Lancashire and Yorkshire Railway Trust". |

==== Locomotives out of action ====
| Number & Name | Type | Photograph | Livery | Notes |
|---|---|---|---|---|
| LMS 13065 | LMS Class 5P/4F "Crab" 2-6-0 | | | Built in 1927 at Crewe Works. Out of service for 2018, due to cracked flue tubes, and replacement of all the flue tubes needs to be undertaken alongside replacing the cracked ones. The engine's 10-year overhaul is to be undertaken in a bid to allow the ELR to have an operational engine rather than having 34092 out of traffic at the same time as 13065 in the future. |
| LMS 45337 | LMS Stanier Class 5 4-6-0 | | | Built in 1937 by Armstrong Whitworth. Last steamed in 2017, under overhaul as of 2026. |

=== Diesel ===
==== Operational Locomotives ====
| Number & Name | Type | Photograph | Livery | Notes |
|---|---|---|---|---|
| 4002 'Arundel Castle' | MSC Hudswell Clarke | | M.S.C. Green | Built in 1958. |

==== Operational DMUs ====
  - BR Class 144 unit 144009. Great Midlands Trains (Fictitious). Built in 1986
