= Bury Bolton Street railway station =

Heritage railway station in Greater Manchester, England

Bury Bolton Street
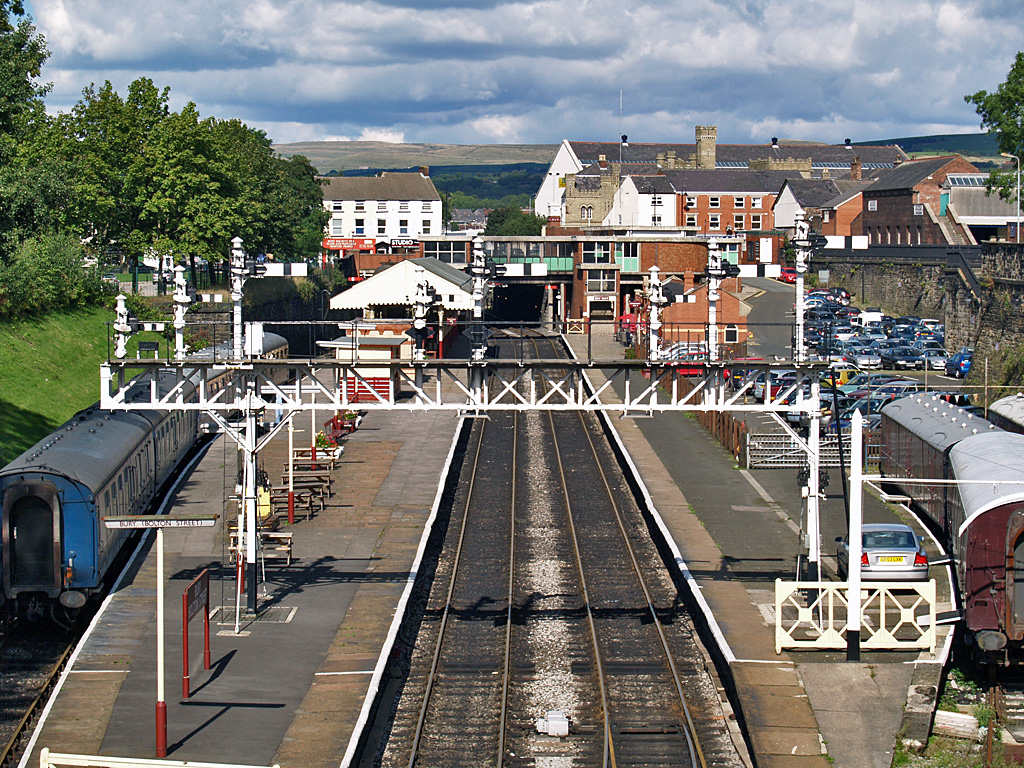

General information
- Location: Bury, Greater Manchester; England
- Coordinates: 53.5934°N 2.2997°W
- Grid reference: SD802107
- System: Station on heritage railway
- Manager: East Lancashire Railway
- Platforms: 4

Key dates
- 28 September 1846: Opened as Bury
- February 1866: Renamed Bury Bolton Street
- 17 March 1980: Closed by British Rail
- 25 July 1987: Reopened as a heritage railway station
Location

Bury Bolton Street is a heritage railway station in Bury, Greater Manchester, England. It formerly served the town on the national railway network between 1846 and 1980; it is now a stop on the East Lancashire Railway.

== History ==
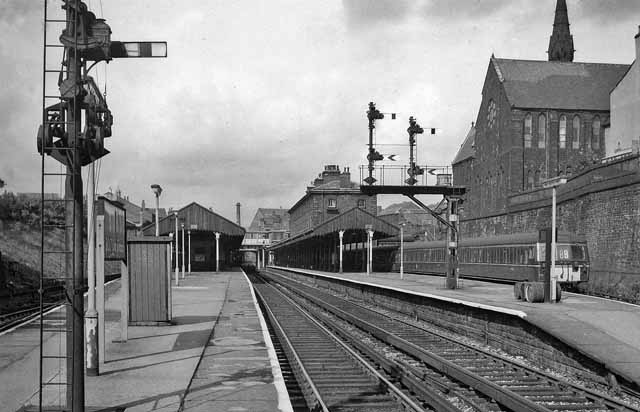
The station in 1963

The station was opened by the East Lancashire Railway (ELR) on 28 September 1846, as Bury station. The ELR was absorbed by the Lancashire & Yorkshire Railway on 13 May 1859. The station was renamed Bury Bolton Street in February 1866.

It was formerly the town's main station, with following links:

- North to: Ramsbottom, thence via Stubbins Junction either to Rawtenstall and Bacup or to Haslingden and Accrington
- South to: Radcliffe Central, Whitefield, Prestwich and Manchester Victoria or via Radcliffe Bridge to Clifton Junction and the Bolton line.

There was also a local branch to Holcombe Brook and a curve to connect with Bury Knowsley Street.

The building is situated in a cutting with a low level yard on the east side, approached by an incline from Bolton Street and a flight of steps from Bank Street. Bolton Street Tunnel is sited to the north.

In its original incarnation, it boasted the headquarters of the East Lancashire Railway, situated on the up platform adjacent to the yard. This fine neo-classical structure in the Italianate style had the usual station accommodation on the ground floor and the company offices (including a boardroom) on the upper floors. The headquarters building supported an overall train shed roof in the Paxton style, supported on the other side by a row of iron columns on an island platform. The west side had through lines and a rope-hauled incline giving access to the wagon works, which is now the site of Bury Leisure Centre.

The station was rebuilt in the 1880s and the existing platform canopy dates from that time. Street frontage buildings were also provided.

The Manchester-Prestwich-Radcliffe Central-Bury line was electrified in 1916.

The station passed to the London Midland and Scottish Railway in 1923. From 1 January 1948, the station was operated by British Railways.

The street level buildings were destroyed by fire on 14 May 1947, while a disaster was narrowly averted in January 1952 when over one hundred football fans were injured when the bridge over the track collapsed under their weight. Both were replaced with a new brick and concrete entrance and footbridge later that year. The old headquarters building was demolished in January 1974.

Passenger trains on the Holcombe Brook branch ended in 1952; those on the lines to Accrington, Bacup and Clifton Junction were withdrawn in 1966, with the Rawtenstall trains following suit in 1972. Only the link to Manchester Victoria remained.

British Rail closed the station on 17 March 1980, when Manchester Victoria services were moved the new Bury Interchange further east into the town centre. It served up until 1991, before the entire Bury Line was converted to light rail operation. It reopened in 1992 for the Manchester Metrolink operation.

Bolton Street station, with its original features, was rescued from demolition and placed in the care of the East Lancashire Railway, a preservation group. The line to Ramsbottom and Rawtenstall was reopened as a heritage railway in 1987 and has since been extended to Heywood.

== Layout ==
The station was extensively remodelled by the Lancashire and Yorkshire Railway, which absorbed the ELR in 1859, into its present form.

There are four platforms:

- 1: A bay platform at the south-east end
- 2: The up platform on the east side
- 3: The down platform, one side of the island platform
- 4: A bidirectional platform; the other side of the island platform and adjacent to the western retaining walls, which had a unique bidirectional signal mounted on a wall bracket.

The platforms were equipped with normal canopies and a new entrance was created on Bolton Street, with street frontage buildings across the tracks accessing a footbridge.

Since its reopening as part of the heritage railway, a new platform building has been erected on the up platform; this incorporates a façade from the former Bury tram depot. The station is now signalled again and the old Bury South box is back in operation.

== Services ==
The East Lancashire Railway operates every weekend throughout the year, with additional services on Wednesdays, Thursdays and Fridays between Easter and the end of September.

Preceding station	Heritage railways	Following station
Burrs Country Park towards Rawtenstall	East Lancashire Railway	Heywood Terminus
Disused railways
Woodhill Road; Line and station closed	Lancashire and Yorkshire Railway; Bury and Tottington District Railway	Terminus
Summerseat; Line and station open	Lancashire and Yorkshire Railway; East Lancashire Railway	Withins Lane; Line and station closed
Summerseat; Line and station open	Lancashire and Yorkshire Railway; East Lancashire Railway	Knowsley Street; Line open, station closed

== Gallery ==
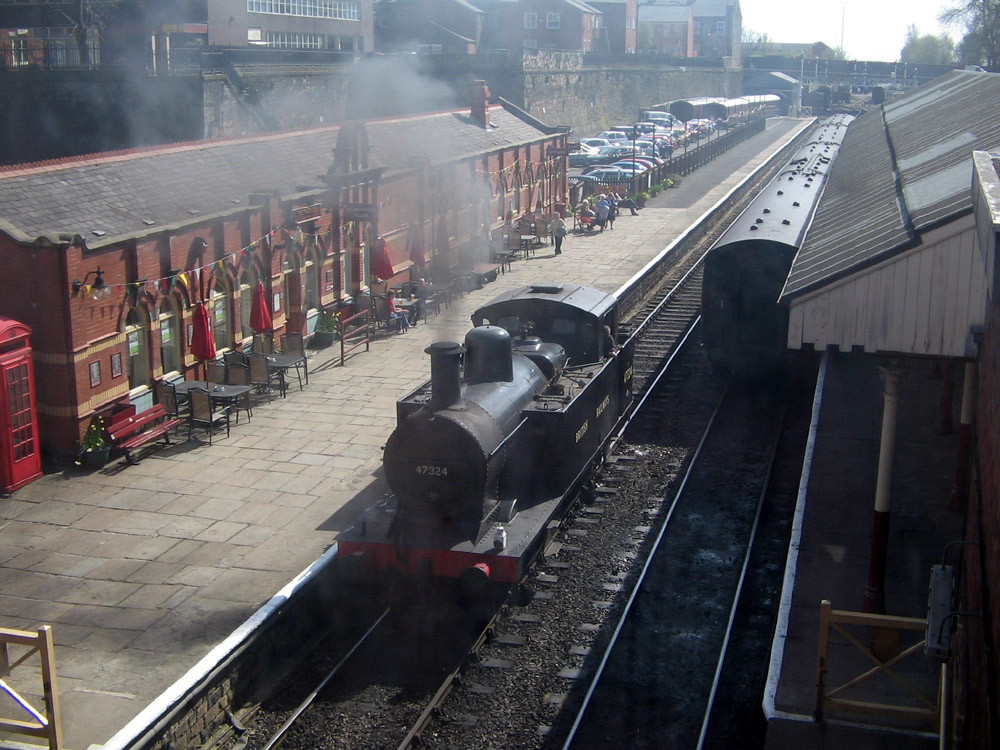
View of platform 2, showing the buffet

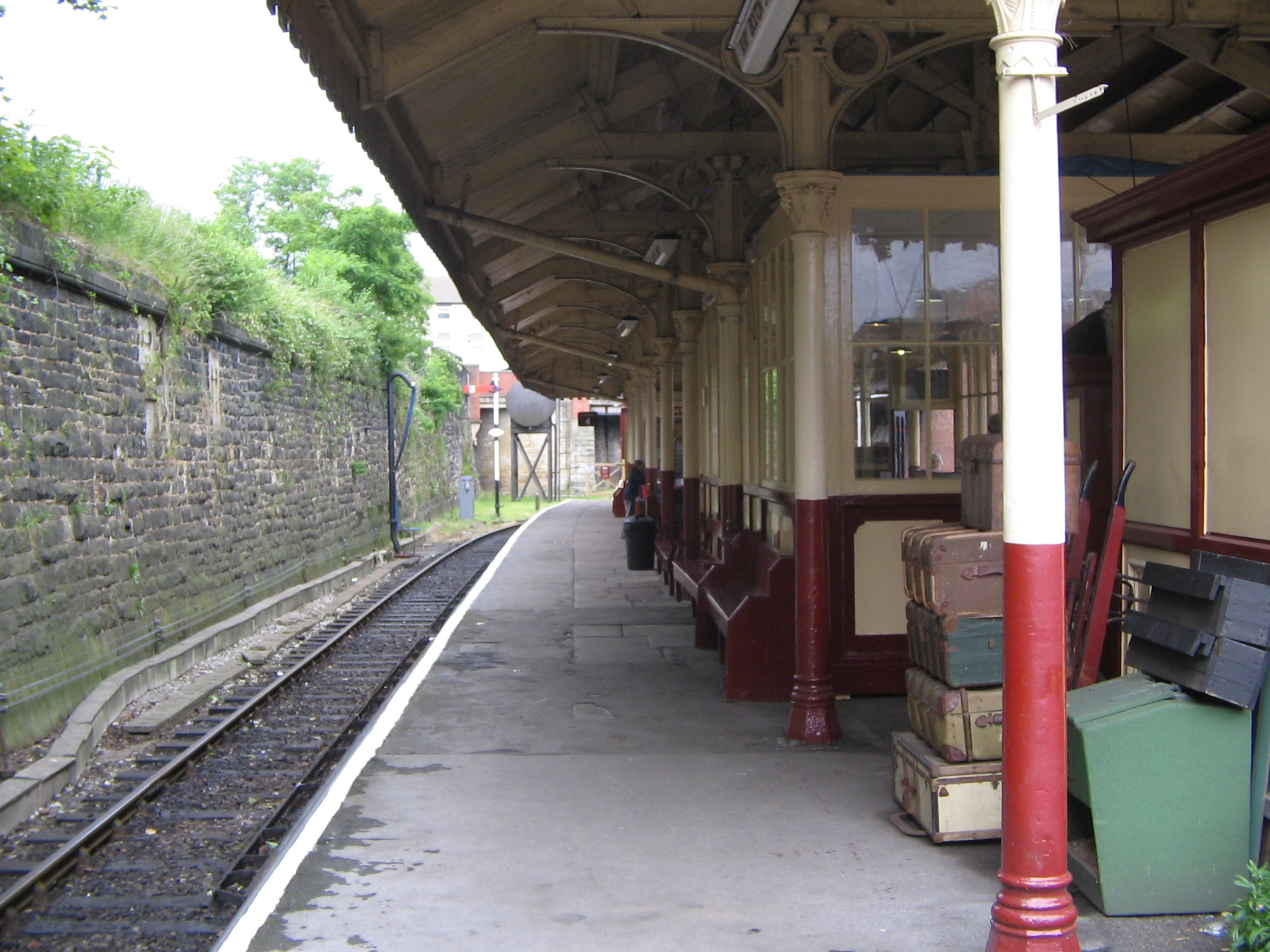
View of platform 4

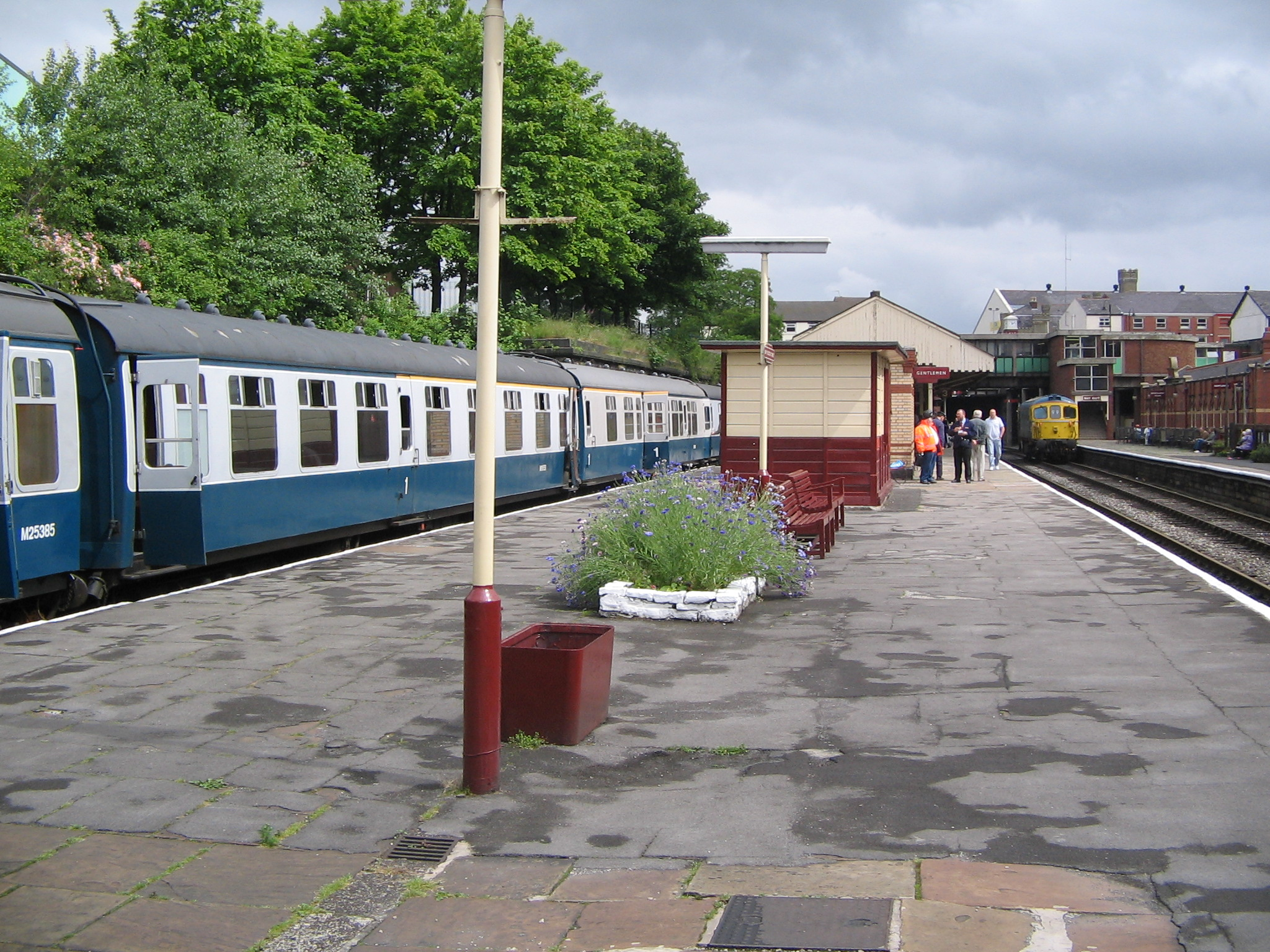
View of the station, looking south

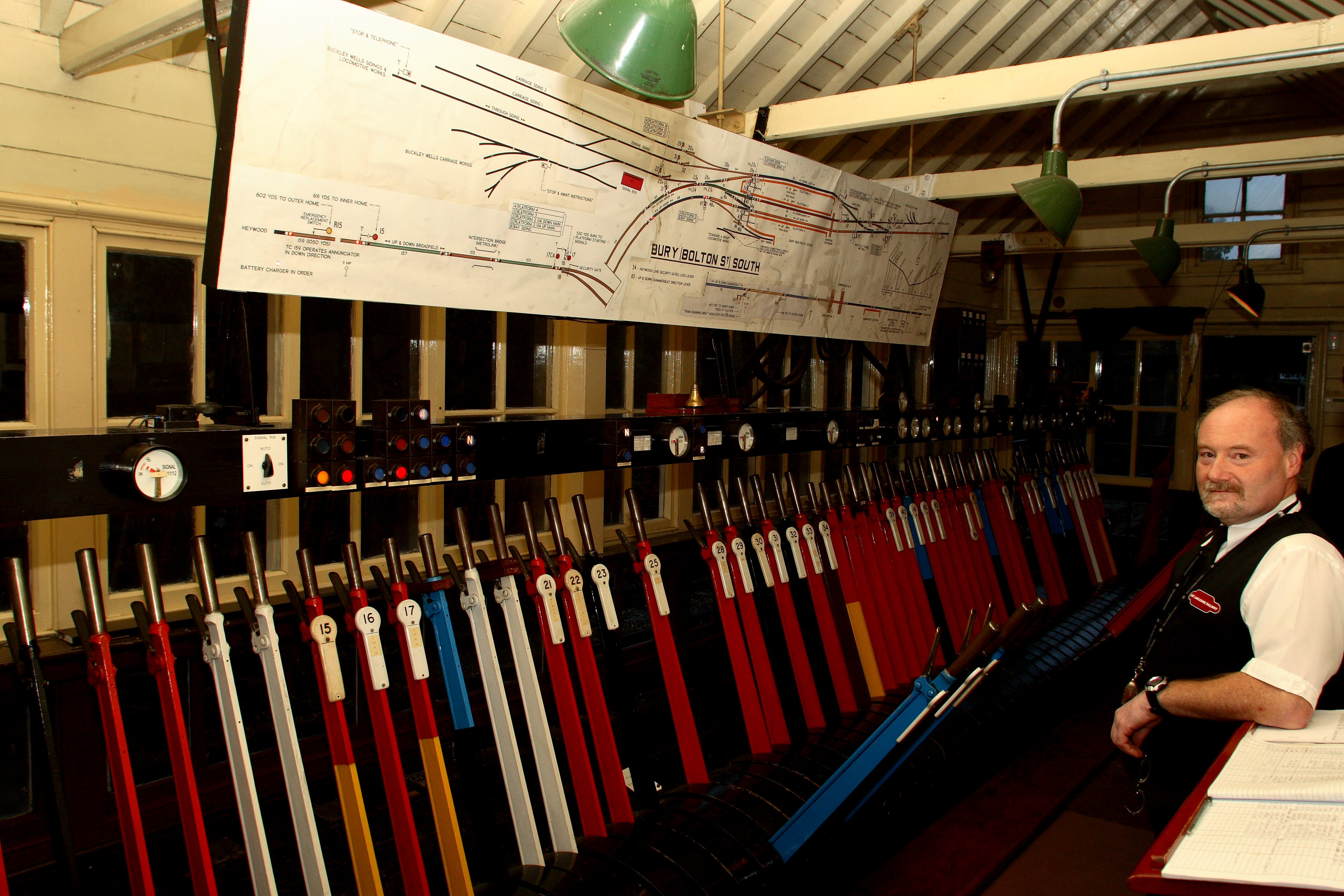
Interior view of Bury South signal box

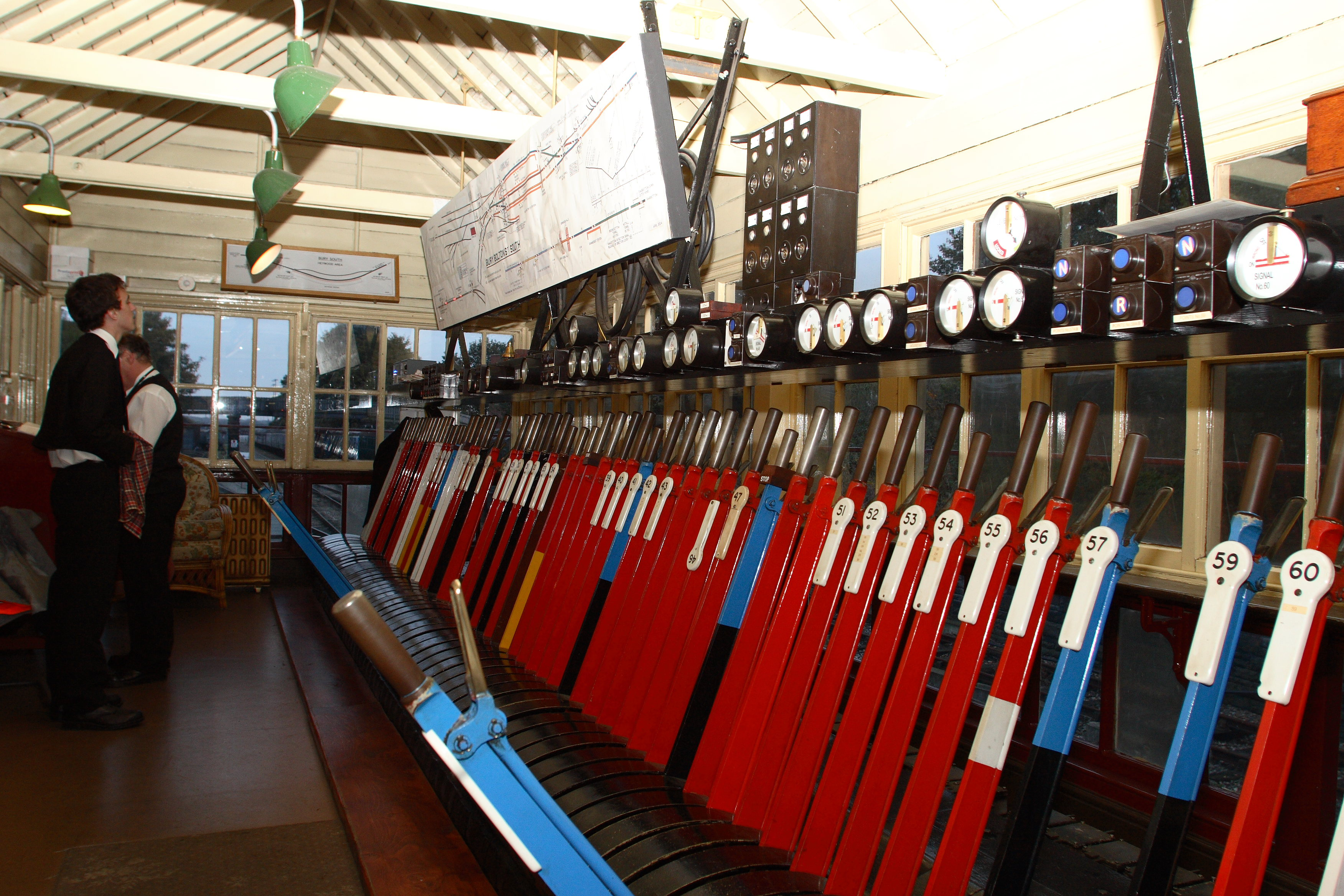
Interior view of Bury South signal box
