= Rawtenstall railway station =

Heritage railway station in Lancashire, England

Coordinates: 53.69883°N 2.29228°W

Rawtenstall
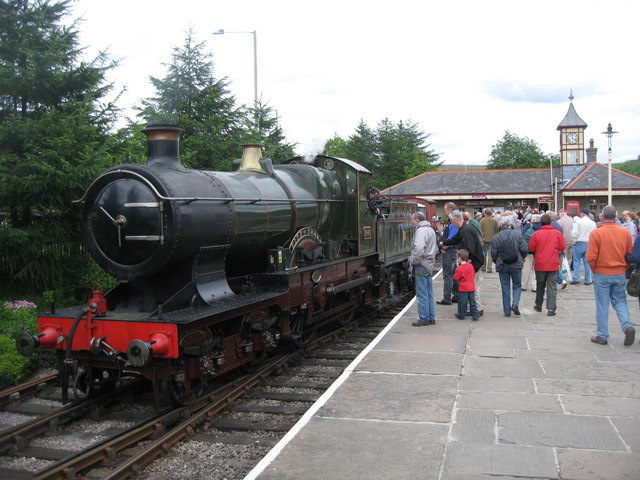
- Rawtenstall railway station in 2007

General information
- Location: Rawtenstall, Lancashire; England
- Grid reference: SD809225
- System: Station on heritage railway
- Manager: East Lancashire Railway
- Platforms: 2

History
- Opened: 1846; Closed for passengers 1972 closed for freight 1980; Reopened 1991
Location

Rawtenstall railway station serves the town of Rawtenstall, in Lancashire, England; it is the northern terminus of the heritage East Lancashire Railway. It was formerly on the national railway network on the line between Bacup, Bury and Manchester.

The Association of Train Operating Companies have identified that the community of Rawtenstall on the East Lancashire Railway's heritage line could benefit from services connecting the station to the national network.

== History ==
The current station opened in September 1846, as part of a line from Clifton Junction, built by the East Lancashire Railway (later incorporated into the Lancashire and Yorkshire Railway). The line reached Waterfoot in 1848 and Bacup in 1852.

For most of its life, the station was on a through route for passenger services between Manchester Victoria and Bacup, via Bury Bolton Street.

By 1966, there were services at least every half an hour; every fifteen minutes at peak times and on Saturdays. After being listed for closure under the Beeching Axe, passenger and goods services to Bacup were withdrawn on 3 December 1966 and passenger services to Bury on 3 June 1972. Freight services to the British Fuel Company's coal concentration depot continued until 4 December 1980, when British Rail abruptly discontinued them, stating that the 14,000 tonnes of coal handled was far less than when the depot had been opened and the decline was mainly due to householders switching to other types of fuel.

Closure came as a surprise to local councils, which had been planning to transform Fernhill depot, alongside the Bury line, into a rail-served waste disposal facility capable of dealing with 600 tonnes per day by 1984. The coal depot at Rawtenstall would remain open to be served by road from rail-linked depots at Blackburn, Burnley and Chadderton.

The station was saved in 1987 by the then newly reopened East Lancashire Railway. The first service arrived at Rawtenstall on 27 April 1991.

== Facilities ==
The station has been rebuilt extensively by the East Lancashire Railway, as the original buildings were demolished at closure. Part of the current station building lies across the former route on towards Bacup.

The station has a ticket office and waiting room in the main building. The ticket office is in the centre of the station. The waiting room contains replicas of an original fireplace and original seats; it was restored as close to the original as possible. There is also a small wooden waiting shelter.

There are two platform faces; however, only the main one is available for regular passenger services, owing to the limitations of the signalling currently provided.

== Services ==
The East Lancashire Railway operates every weekend throughout the year, with additional services on Wednesdays, Thursdays and Fridays between Easter and the end of September.

Preceding station	Heritage railways	Following station
Irwell Vale towards Heywood	East Lancashire Railway	Terminus
Disused railways
Ewood Bridge and Edenfield	Lancashire and Yorkshire Railway; Rawtenstall to Bacup Line	Clough Fold
