= List of stations and halts on the Vale of Rheidol Railway =

This is a list of the stations and halts on the Vale of Rheidol Railway (Welsh: Rheilffordd Cwm Rheidol), a 1 ft 11 3/4 in (603 mm) narrow gauge preserved railway line running for 11 3/4 miles (18.9 km) from Aberystwyth on the Mid-Wales coast to Devil's Bridge in the Cambrian Mountains. The line was opened in 1902 to carry lead from the mines and timber for pit props down to the harbour in Aberystwyth. It has carried passengers since opening.

== Route ==
The main terminus of the line is at Aberystwyth, where the railway's administrative headquarters and the workshops are located. Leaving this station the line travels eastwards towards the village of Llanbadarn Fawr. There is a request stop at Llanbadarn. Trains towards Devil's Bridge pause here briefly to activate the level crossing before proceeding. A short distance from Llanbadarn, the line passes over the River Rheidol on a timber trestle bridge. The line then passes the Glanyrafon Industrial Estate which has developed over the last 25 years before heading out into open countryside. After 4.5 miles (7.2 km) Capel Bangor station is reached. There is a passing loop here and a station building. All trains stop here.

Leaving Capel Bangor the line passes the Rheidol Riding Centre before it begins to climb steeply through the woods at Tanyrallt. After about 10 minutes the train reaches Nantyronen a small country station and request stop. Here locomotives take water from the water column before the train continues on the climb to Aberffrwd.

Aberffrwd station is 7 1/2 miles (12.1 km) from Aberystwyth, a journey time of approximately 40 minutes. There is a passing loop here and a station building. All trains stop here. Beyond Aberffrwd the line climbs at a gradient of 1 in 50 all the way to Devil's Bridge. This section of the line is isolated with no road access. The track sits on a ledge known as Pant Mawr and follows the contours of the terrain, passing through two request stops at Rheidol Falls and Rhiwfron before reaching Devil's Bridge.

== List of stations and halts ==
Name	Image	Distance from Aberystwyth	Elevation	Grid Reference	Notes
Aberystwyth		n/a	14 ft (4.3 m)	SN586812	The headquarters of the railway are at Aberystwyth a short distance from the mainline railway station. At the eastern end of the site is a purpose-built workshop building and loco shed. New carriage sheds were constructed in 2020 on the site of the former mainline platforms. The former Great Western motive power depot houses the Engine Shed Museum.
Llanbadarn		1.25 miles (2.01 km)	25 ft (7.6 m)	SN598806	Llanbadarn is a request stop serving the village of Llanbadarn Fawr. There are no surfaced platforms or buildings. In the 1950s when the Royal Welsh Show was held in Llanbadarn, the VoR operated an intensive shuttle service from Aberystwyth to Llanbadarn, carrying tens of thousands of passengers in a very short period.
Glanyrafon		2.25 miles (3.62 km)	33 ft (10 m)	SN614804	Glanyrafon Halt is a request stop serving the nearby industrial estate. There are no surfaced platforms or buildings.
Capel Bangor		4.5 miles (7.2 km)	75 ft (23 m)	SN647797	Capel Bangor station is close to the village of Capel Bangor. In the mid-20th century a carriage shed here provided additional accommodation for the line's stock, and a new shed built roughly on the same location was added in 2005. New platforms and a station building (a replica of the original) were built in 2012.
Nantyronen		6.75 miles (10.86 km)	200 ft (61 m)	SN674781	Nantyronen is a request stop. Trains towards Devil's Bridge pause briefly here to allow the locomotive to take on water. A new platform and station building were completed in 2013.
Aberffrwd		7.5 miles (12.1 km)	280 ft (85 m)	SN687787	Aberffrwd station is close to the hamlet of Aberffrwd. A new platform and station building were completed in 2013.
Rheidol Falls		9.25 miles (14.89 km)	425 ft (130 m)	SN707787	Rheidol Falls is a request stop. A new platform and station building were completed in 2013.
Rhiwfron		10.75 miles (17.30 km)	590 ft (180 m)	SN728778	Rhiwfron is a request stop. A new platform and station building were completed in 2013.
Devil's Bridge		11.75 miles (18.91 km)	680 ft (210 m)	SN738769	Devil's Bridge station is the railway's eastern terminus. It is a short walk from the Devil's Bridge Waterfalls.

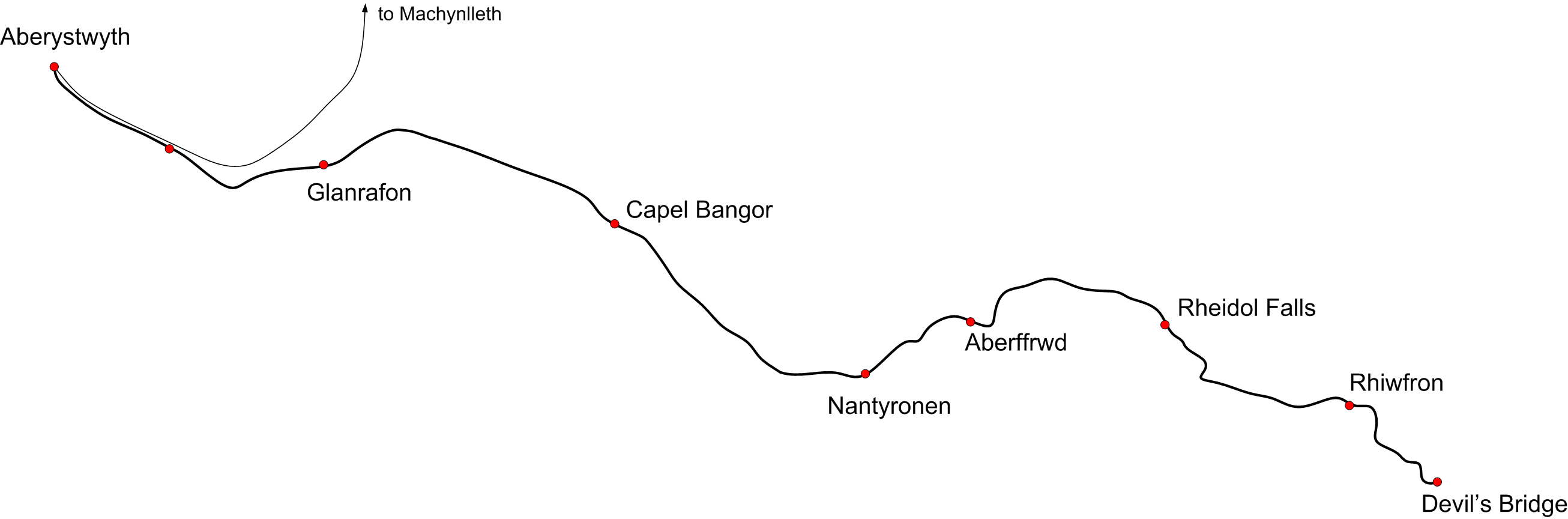
Map of the Vale of Rheidol Light Railway in 2006

== Bibliography ==
- Green, CC (1986). The Vale of Rheidol Light Railway. Wild Swan. ISBN 0-906867-43-6.
- Johnson, Peter (1999). Welsh Narrow Gauge: a view from the past. Ian Allan Publishing. ISBN 0-7110-2654-8.
