= Rheidol =

Rheidol can refer to:

- Afon Rheidol, a river in Mid-Wales
- Vale of Rheidol Railway, a narrow-gauge railway in Mid-Wales
- Rheidol power station, a hydroelectric scheme on the Afon Rheidol
- Rheidol (locomotive), a former locomotive on the Vale of Rheidol Railway
- Rheidol Falls railway station, a station on the Vale of Rheidol Railway
