= Aberffrwd =

Aberffrwd may refer to one of the following places in Wales:

- Aberffrwd, Ceredigion
  - Aberffrwd railway station
