= Capel Bangor =

Village in Ceredigion, Wales

Coordinates: 52°24′N 3°58′W

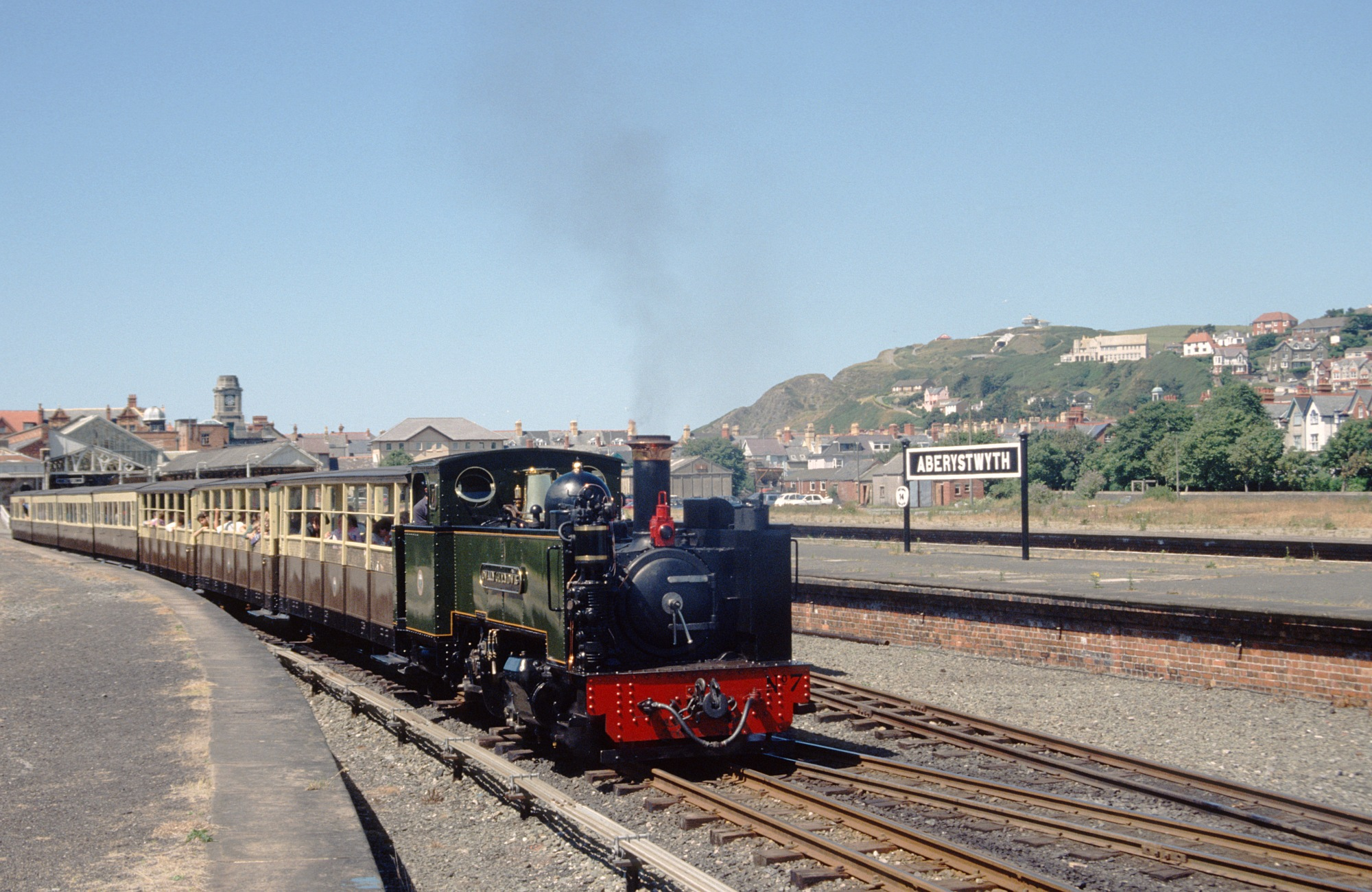
Train leaving Aberystwyth station

Capel Bangor (Welsh: Penllwyn) is a small village in Ceredigion, Wales, approximately 5 miles (8.0 km) east of Aberystwyth.

The A44 road and the seasonal Vale of Rheidol Railway pass through.

In the 2011 census, the population was 256, with 63% born in Wales.

== Church ==
The Church in Wales St. David's Church (Welsh: Eglwys Dewi Sant) was built to the classical designs of George Clinton of Aberystwyth between 1837 and 1839.

== Railway station ==
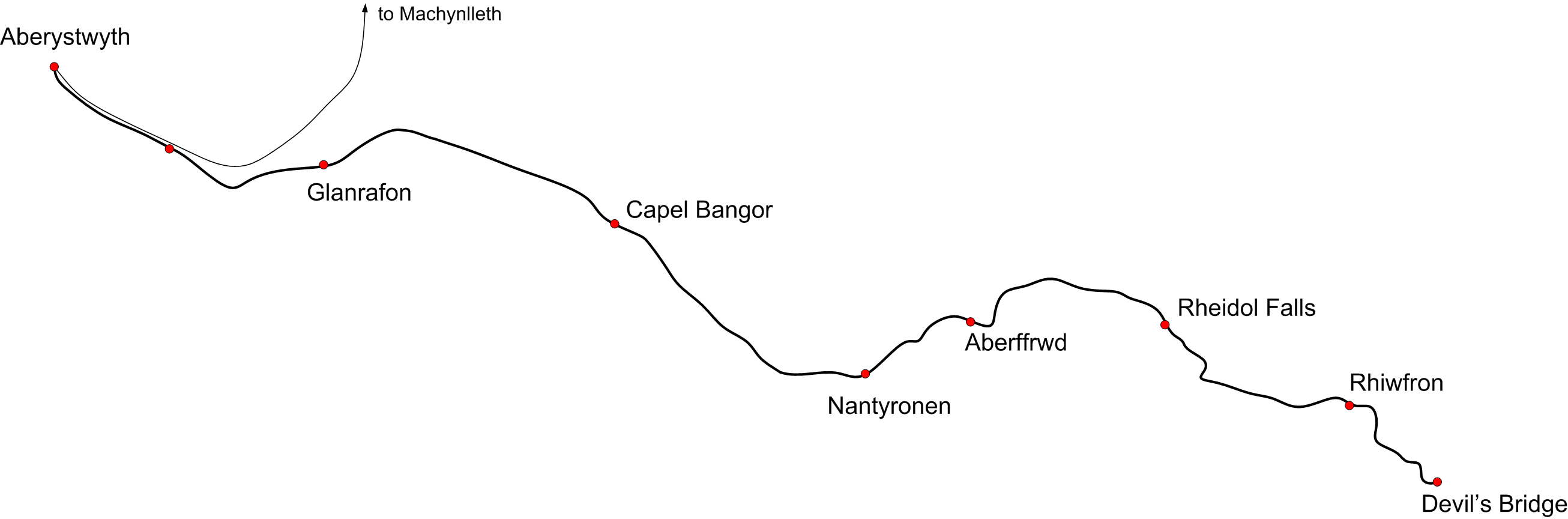
The Vale of Rheidol Light Railway in 2006

Capel Bangor railway station is on the seasonal Vale of Rheidol Railway. Unlike most other preserved railways in the United Kingdom, the Vale of Rheidol Railway did not have a period of closure between its being part of the national rail system and becoming a heritage railway, and so has operated a continuous service for residents and tourists.

== Tourism and local economy ==
- The Magic of Life Butterfly House, an all-weather butterfly zoo visitor attraction.
