= Glanyrafon railway station =

Railway station in Ceredigion, Wales

Glanyrafon
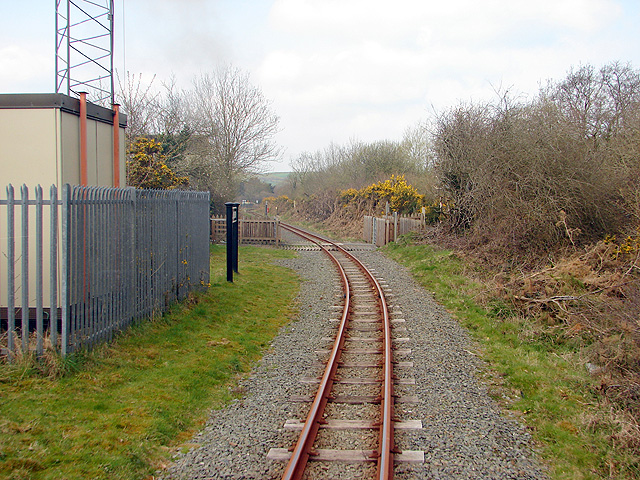
- View of Glanyrafon halt (before the 2012 removal of the RETB mast)

General information
- Location: Glanyrafon, Ceredigion; Wales
- Coordinates: 52.404515°N 4.037931°W
- System: Station on heritage railway
- Operator: Vale of Rheidol Railway
- Platforms: 1

History
- Original company: Vale of Rheidol Railway
- Pre-grouping: Cambrian Railways
- Post-grouping: Great Western Railway

Key dates
- 7 May 1904: Opened
- 31 August 1939: Temporarily closed
- 23 July 1945: Reopened
Location

Glanyrafon railway station (formerly Glanrafon) is a railway station serving Glanyrafon in Ceredigion in Mid-Wales. It is a request stop on the preserved Vale of Rheidol Railway. It is 2 miles 26 chains (3.74 km) from Aberystwyth and has no surviving station buildings or platforms, passengers are required to step down from the train to the grass below.

In 2012, an RETB signalling mast, which was part of the Cambrian Line infrastructure, was removed from the station by contractors working for Network Rail, having been in place since the 1980s.

Preceding station	Heritage railways	Following station
Llanbadarn towards Aberystwyth	Vale of Rheidol Railway	Capel Bangor towards Devil's Bridge
