= Aberffrwd, Ceredigion =

Village in Ceredigion, Wales

Coordinates: 52°23′29″N 3°55′52″W

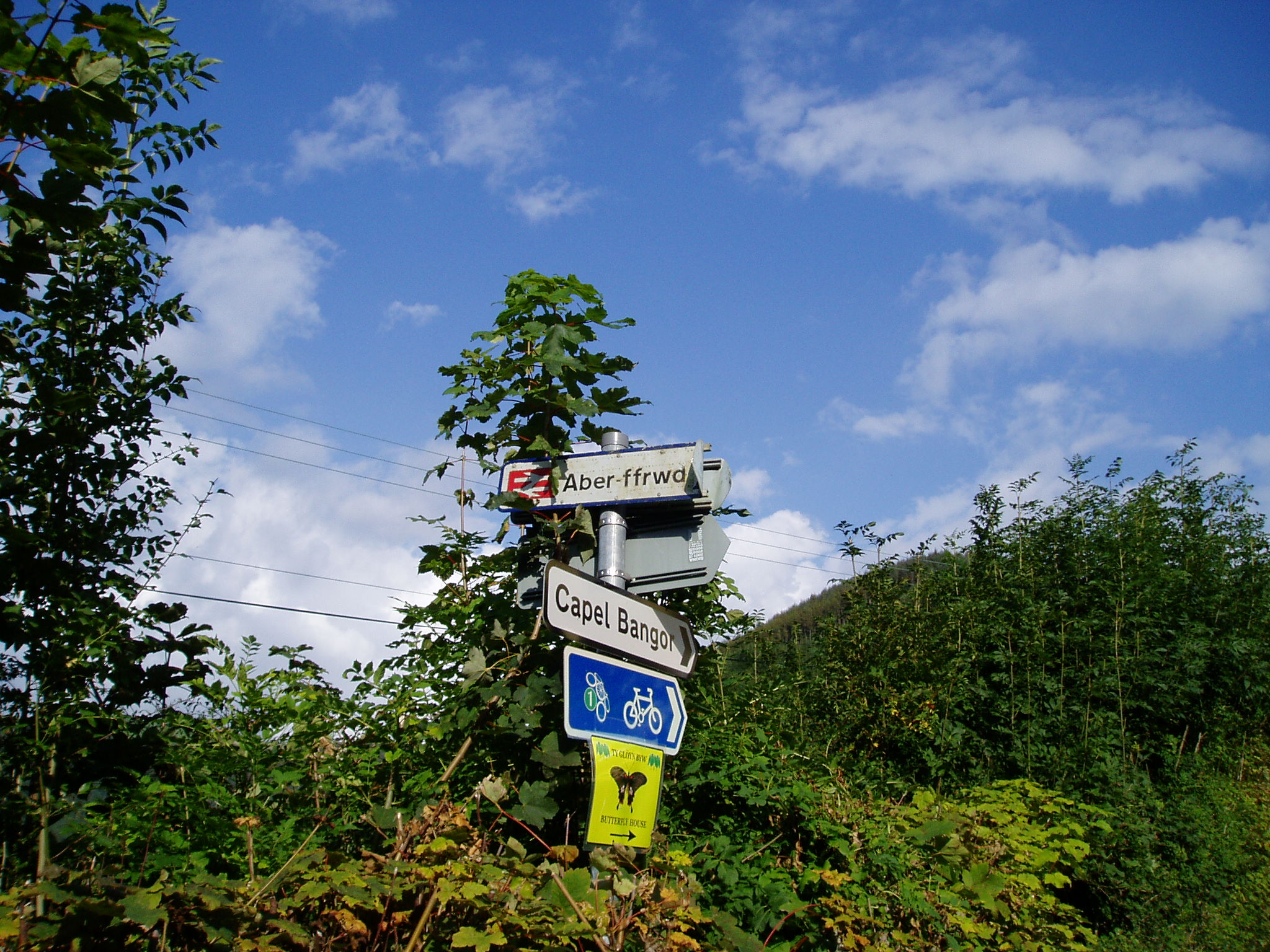
Road signs in Aberffrwd.

Aberffrwd is a village in the Welsh principal area of Ceredigion. It has a railway station on the narrow-gauge Vale of Rheidol Railway, which was operated by British Rail as part of the island wide rail network until 1980.
