= Rhiwfron railway station =

Railway station in Ceredigion, Wales

Rhiwfron
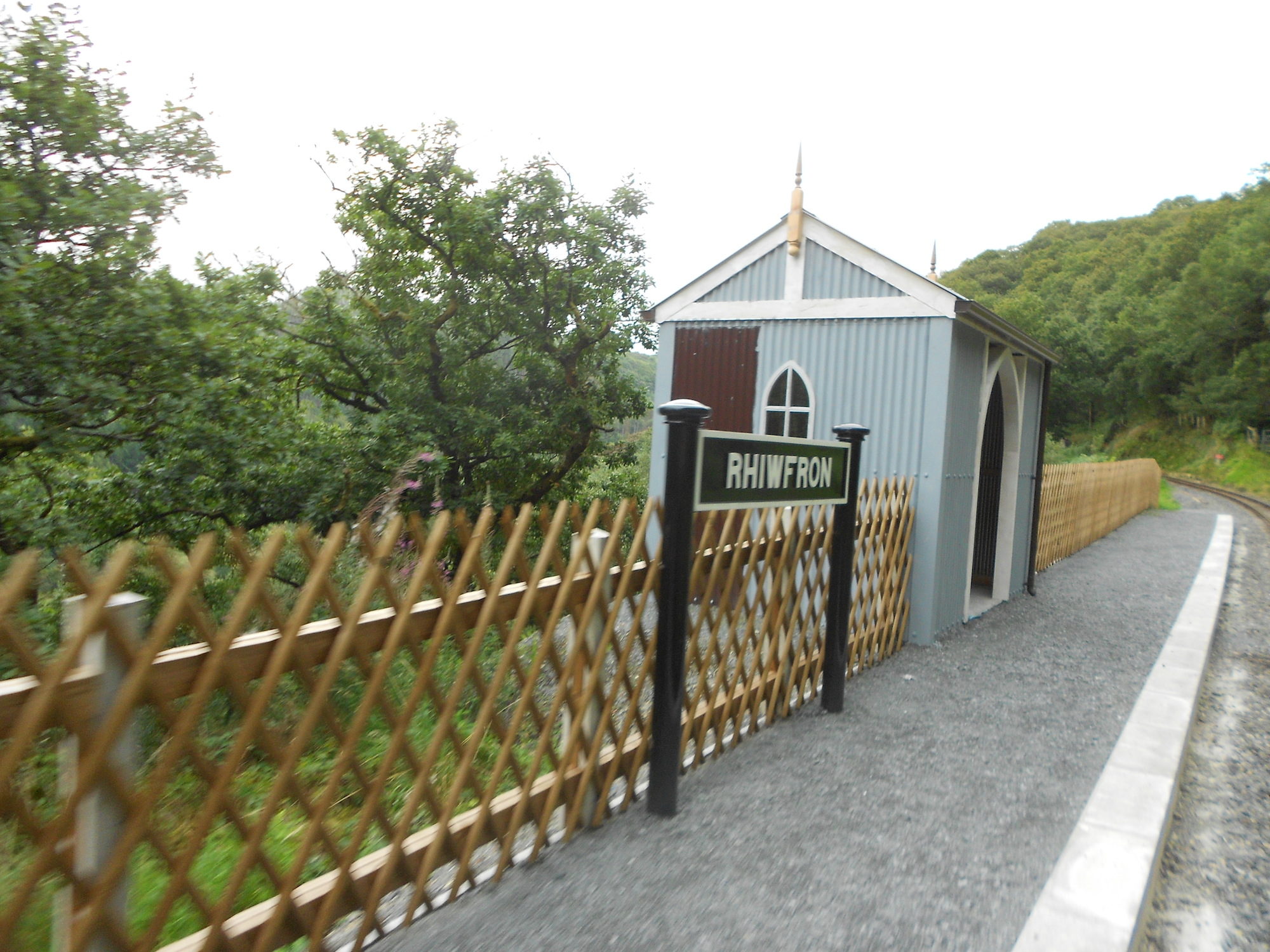
- Rhiwfron railway station in 2013, with station building complete, but unpainted.

General information
- Location: Ceredigion; Wales
- Coordinates: 52.383658°N 3.868915°W
- Grid reference: SN729777
- System: Station on heritage railway
- Manager: Vale of Rheidol Railway
- Platforms: 1

Key dates
- 1902: Station opens
- 31 August 1939: Station closes due to World War 2
- 23 July 1945: Station reopens
Location

Rhiwfron railway station is a railway station serving Rhiwfron in Ceredigion in Mid-Wales. It is an intermediate station on the preserved Vale of Rheidol Railway. This is one of the two stations of the railway, along with Rheidol Falls, which has no road access.

A station or halt has existed here since the opening of the line, but with few facilities beyond the provision of a nameboard. During 2013 the station was considerably enhanced following a grant for rural infrastructure development from the European Union. The station now has a raised and surfaced platform, fencing, and an ornate station building constructed in the style of architecture employed by the original owners of the railway.

Preceding station	Heritage railways	Following station
Rheidol Falls towards Aberystwyth	Vale of Rheidol Railway	Devil's Bridge Terminus
