= Aberffrwd railway station =

Railway station in Aberffrwd, Ceredigion, Wales

Aberffrwd
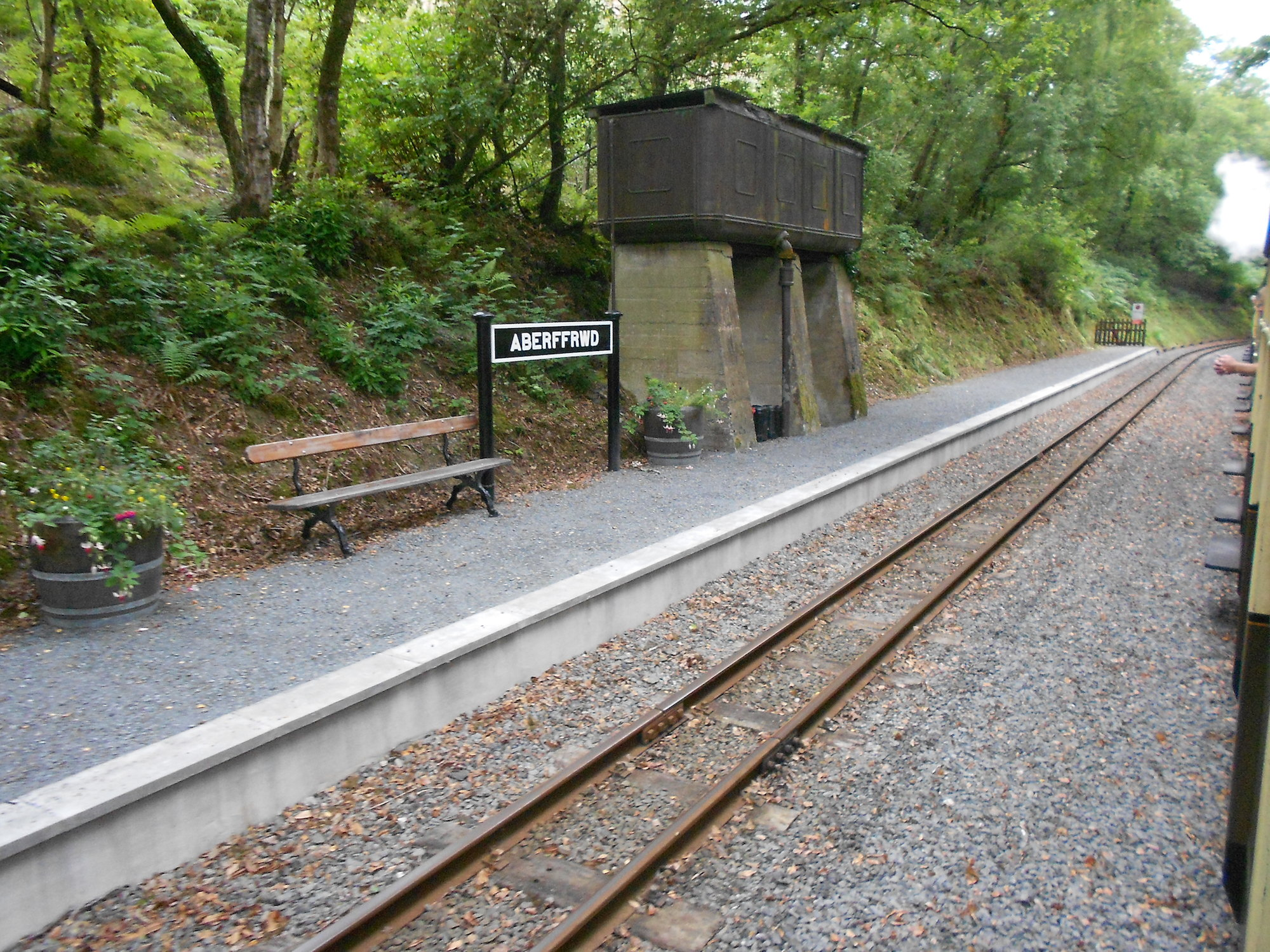
- The water tower and platform 2 at Aberffrwd railway station.

General information
- Location: Aberffrwd, Ceredigion; Wales
- Coordinates: 52.390553°N 3.930085°W
- Grid reference: SN687787
- System: Station on heritage railway
- Manager: Vale of Rheidol Railway
- Platforms: 2

Key dates
- May 1903: Station opens
- 31 August 1939: Station closes due to World War 2
- 23 July 1945: Station reopens
- 1989: Station privatised
- 2013: New buildings & platforms constructed
Location

Aberffrwd railway station is a railway station serving Aberffrwd in Ceredigion in Mid-Wales, and is an intermediate stop on the preserved Vale of Rheidol Railway.

== Facilities and operation ==
The station is equipped with a passing loop on the largely single-track route, as well as a water-tower for the steam locomotives which chiefly work the line. The passing loop was removed by British Rail some years prior to the end of nationalised operations, as an economy measure. However, this severely restricted the timetable by preventing the simultaneous operation of two trains and so the loop was reinstated upon privatisation of the line. It is now common for trains to pass each other at this point during the more intensive summer timetable.

For operational purposes the railway is divided into three block sections. These are Aberystwyth to Capel Bangor, Capel Bangor to Aberffrwd, and Aberffrwd to Devil's Bridge. Each block station has a passing loop and the other three (apart from Aberffrwd) also have additional sidings. The 'Stop Boards' displayed at these block stations are a reminder to the train driver that (s)he must not proceed into the new block section until (s)he is in possession of the proper authority for so doing.

== European Union funding ==
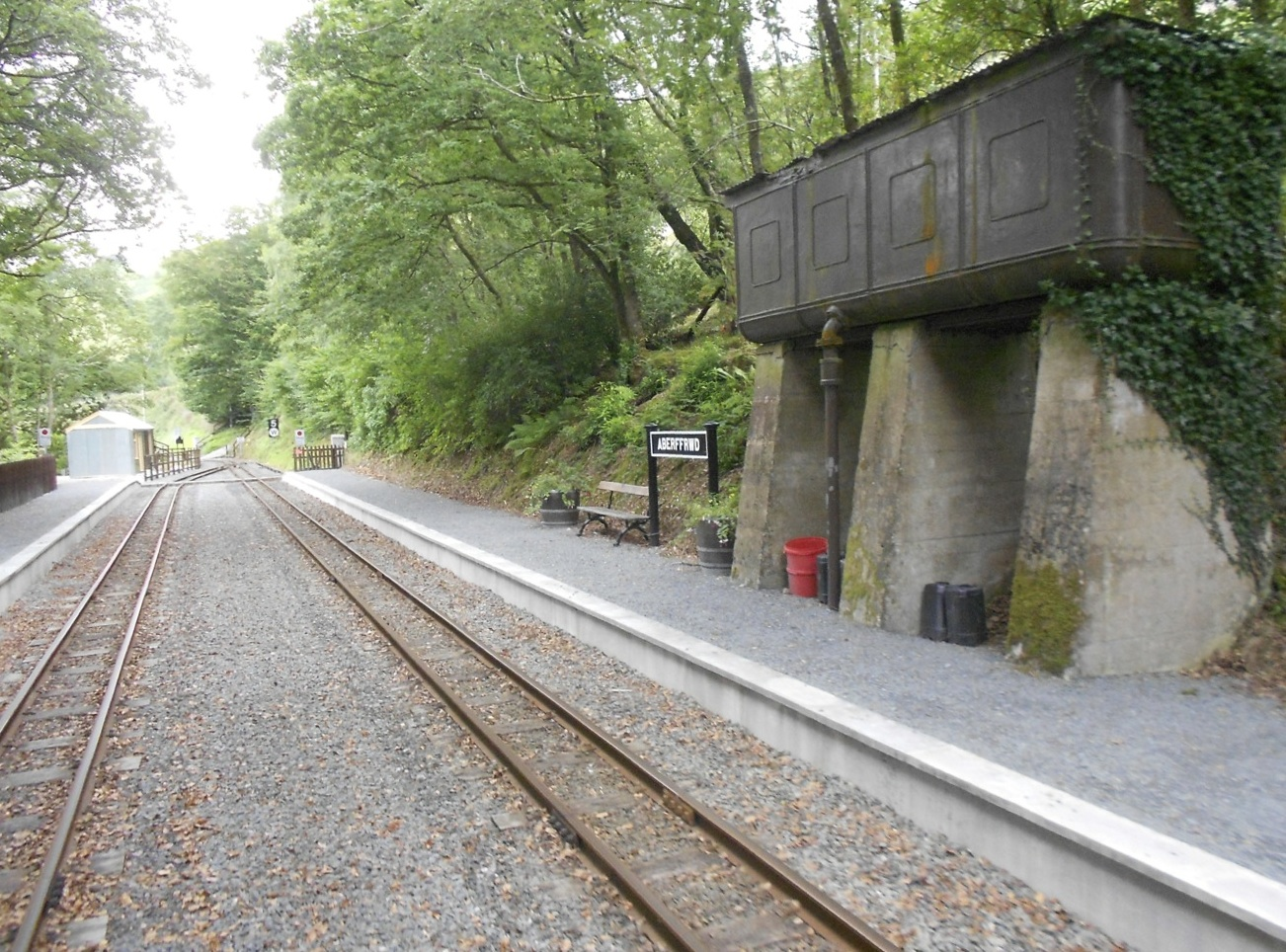
Aberffrwd railway station showing new (2013) platforms and the (still unpainted) station building.

In 2013 a substantial grant was received from the European Union's European Agricultural Fund for Rural Development as part of the Welsh Government's strategic plan for infrastructure development in rural communities. This grant led to the Vale of Rheidol Railway making substantial investment in five of its smaller stations. At Aberffrwd this funding has allowed for the construction of two raised and surfaced platforms, permitting passengers to join or alight from trains on the level, and also the construction of a station building containing an open waiting shelter for passengers, and a station office for staff. Funding also permitted fencing work, landscaping, and the development of the station approach from the nearby road. The facilities were installed in time for the 2013 operating season, and were completed by the end of that year.

Preceding station	Heritage railways	Following station
Nantyronen towards Aberystwyth	Vale of Rheidol Railway	Rheidol Falls towards Devil's Bridge
