= Nantyronen railway station =

Railway station in Ceredigion, Wales

Nantyronen
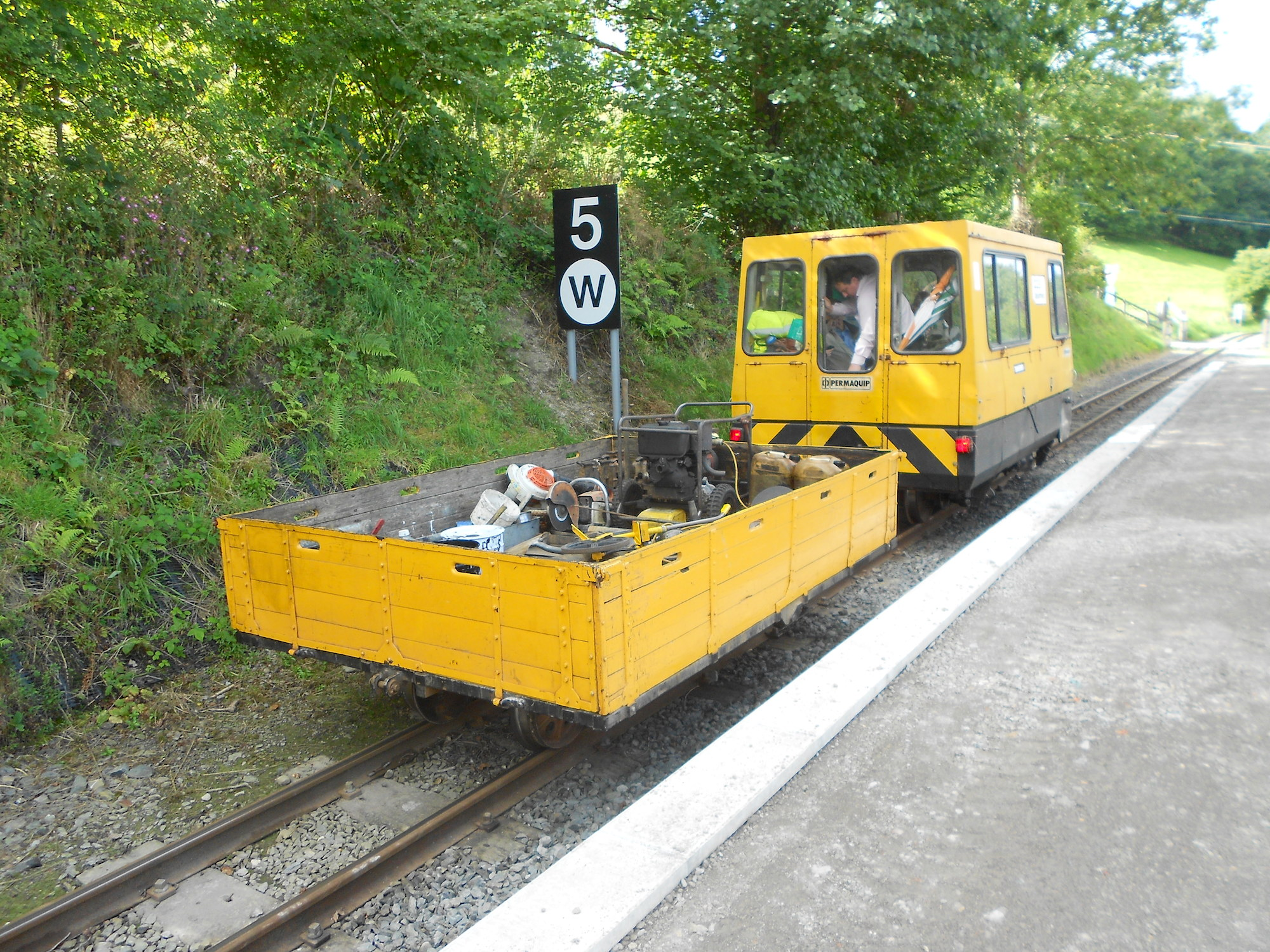
- The Permaquip locomotive and wagon form a works train at Nantyronen railway station.

General information
- Location: Ceredigion; Wales
- Coordinates: 52.385383°N 3.948169°W
- Grid reference: SN674781
- System: Station on heritage railway
- Manager: Vale of Rheidol Railway
- Platforms: 1

Key dates
- 1902: Station opens
- 31 August 1939: Station closes due to World War 2
- 23 July 1945: Station reopens
- 2013: Station building and surfaced platform constructed
Location

Nantyronen railway station is a railway station serving Nantyronen in Ceredigion in Mid-Wales. It is an intermediate station and request stop on the preserved Vale of Rheidol Railway. It is accessible by road from the village of Nantyronen, and also from the Devil's Bridge road (above), by descending the hillside on a steep winding lane.

== Facilities ==
The station has operated throughout the history of the railway, except for a short closure during World War Two. The original station waiting shelter was demolished by British Rail. Later, a temporary building was located at the site. Following the provision of grant money from the European Regional Development Fund a period (replica) station building was constructed. The station was considerably developed during 2013, and now has a raised-level, surfaced platform and fencing. The car park area has been developed, and the site landscaped. There is also a water tower as all steam trains heading to Devil's Bridge stop to take on water.

== Gallery ==
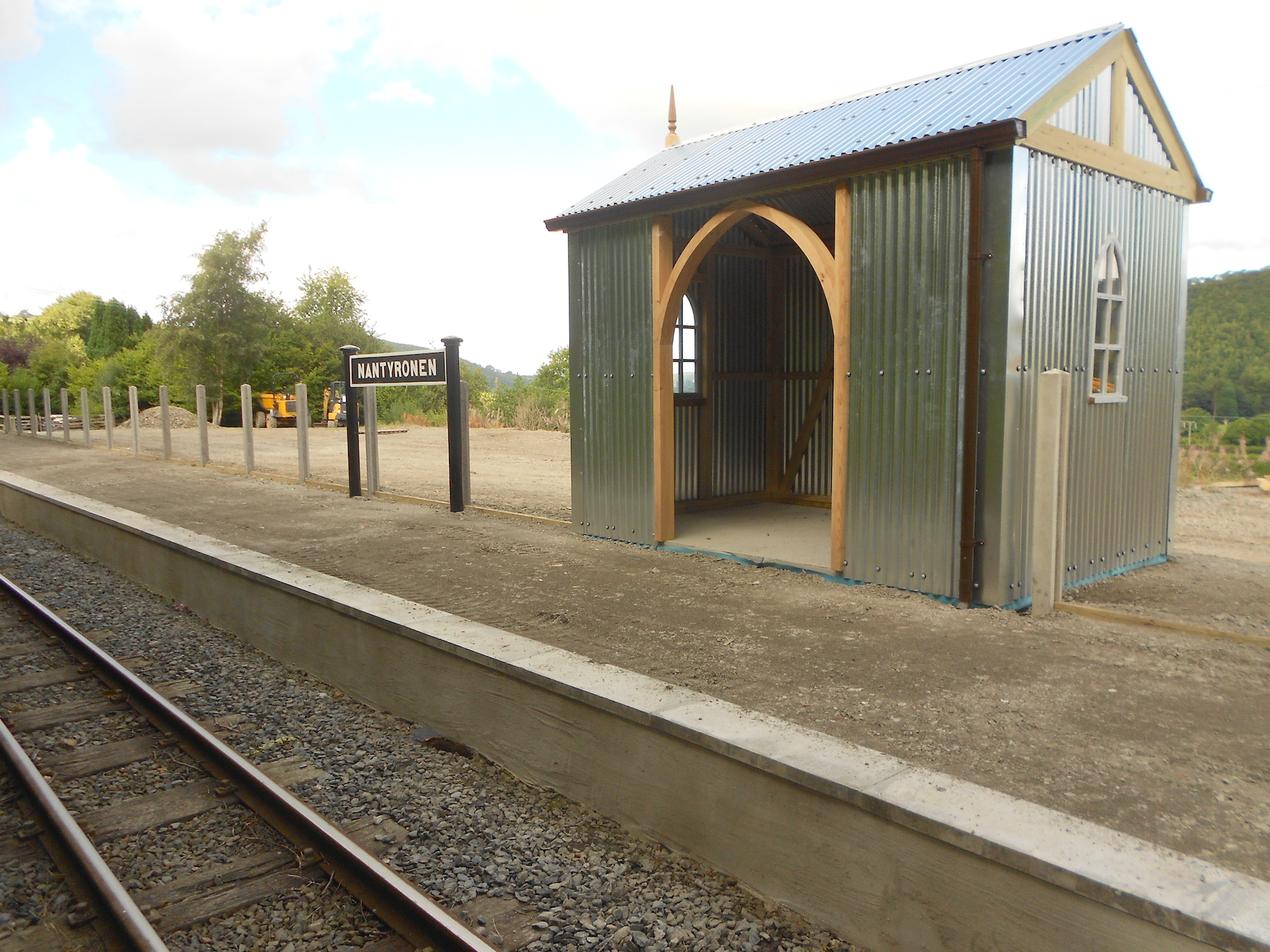
The new platform at Nantyronen railway station still under construction in 2013, with the new station building, yet to be painted.

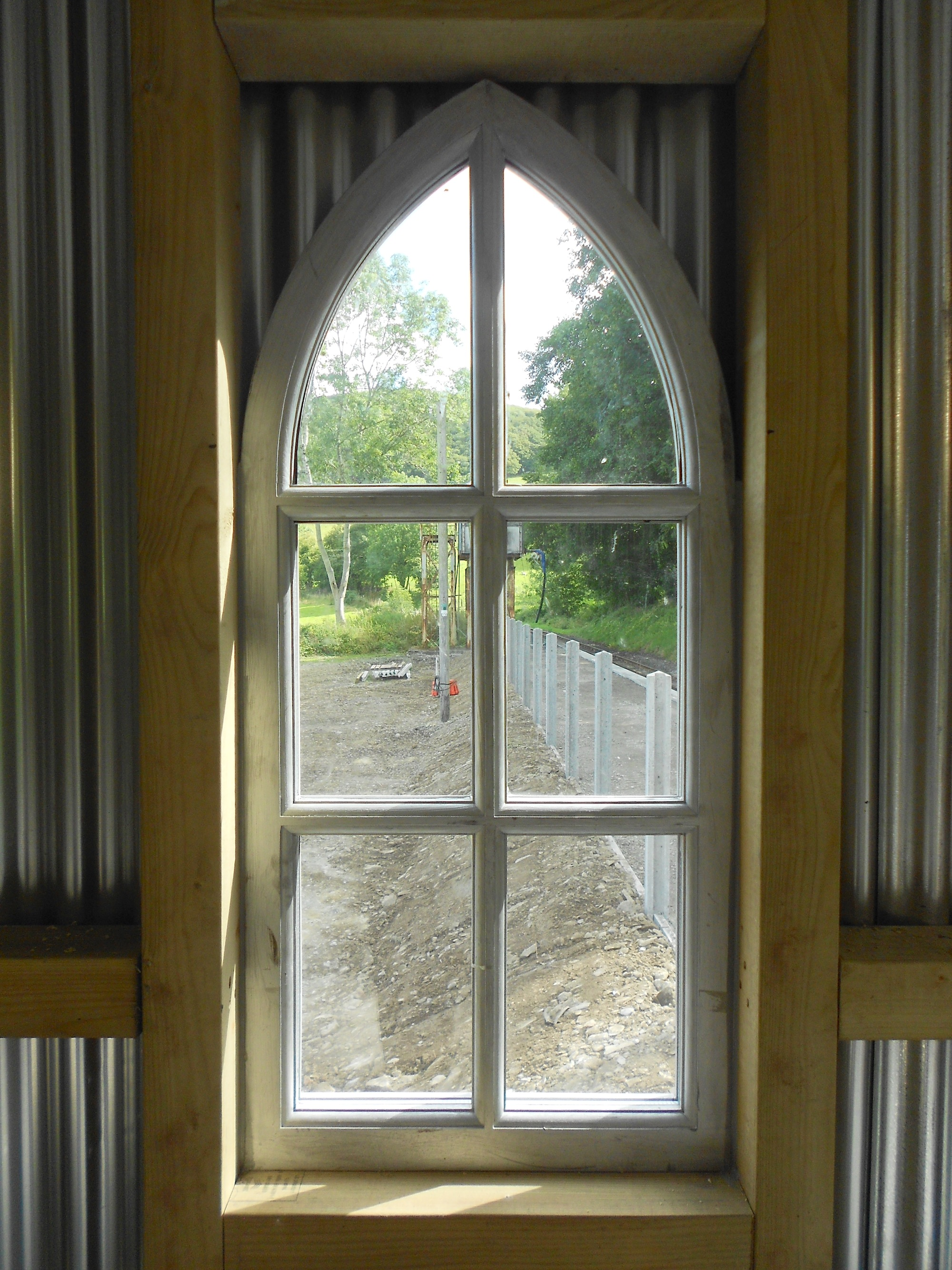
The car park of Nantyronen railway station, viewed from inside the station building.

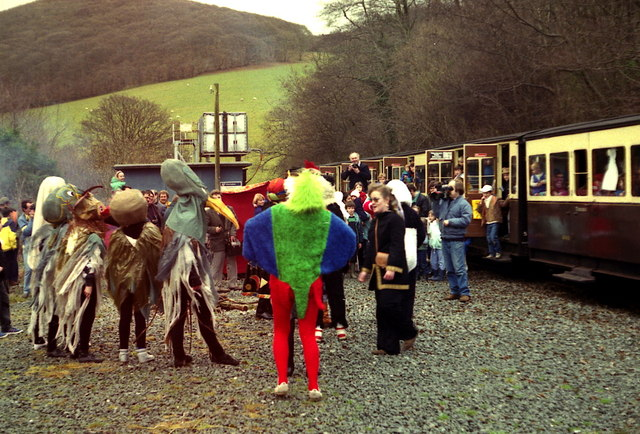
The last British Rail train to run on the Vale of Rheidol Railway before privatisation, at Nantyronen

Preceding station	Heritage railways	Following station
Capel Bangor towards Aberystwyth	Vale of Rheidol Railway	Aberffrwd towards Devil's Bridge
