= Rheidol Falls railway station =

Railway station in Ceredigion, Wales

Rheidol Falls Welsh: Rhaedr Rheidol
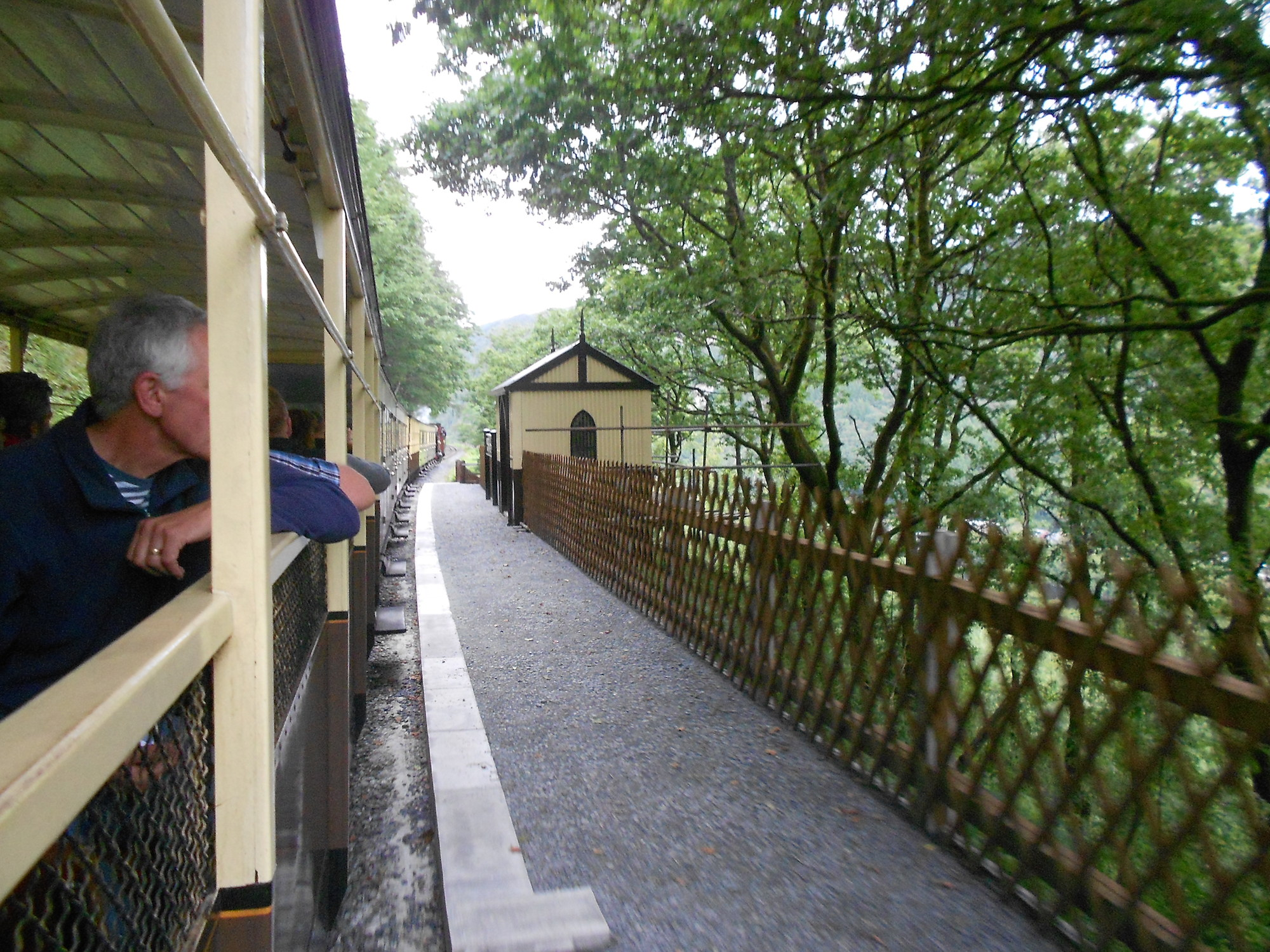
- A train standing at Rheidol Falls railway station on the Vale of Rheidol Railway in Wales.

General information
- Location: Ceredigion; Wales
- Coordinates: 52.3917°N 3.9003°W
- Grid reference: SN707787
- System: Station on heritage railway
- Operator: Vale of Rheidol Railway
- Platforms: 1

History
- Original company: Vale of Rheidol Railway
- Pre-grouping: Cambrian Railways
- Post-grouping: Great Western Railway

Key dates
- 1903: Station opens
- 31 August 1939: Station closes due to World War 2
- 23 July 1945: Station reopens
- 2013: Station building and platforms constructed
Location

Rheidol Falls railway station is a railway station serving Rheidol Falls in Ceredigion in Mid-Wales. It is an intermediate station and request stop on the preserved narrow gauge 1 ft 11¾ in (603 mm) Vale of Rheidol Railway. This is one of the two stations of the railway, along with Rhiwfron, which has no road access.

== Access ==
The station is inaccessible by road. A footpath leads from the valley floor to a level crossing, and then on up the hill above the line. The footpath is well-used by walkers.

== Facilities ==
The station has had limited facilities during its lifetime, despite being open throughout the history of the railway, except for a short closure during World War Two. Following the provision of grant money from the European Union for rural community infrastructure investment, the station was considerably developed during 2013 and now has a raised-level and surfaced platform, fencing and an attractive period (replica) station building.

Preceding station	Heritage railways	Following station
Aberffrwd towards Aberystwyth	Vale of Rheidol Railway	Rhiwfron towards Devil's Bridge
