= Capel Bangor railway station =

Railway station in Ceredigion, Wales

Capel Bangor
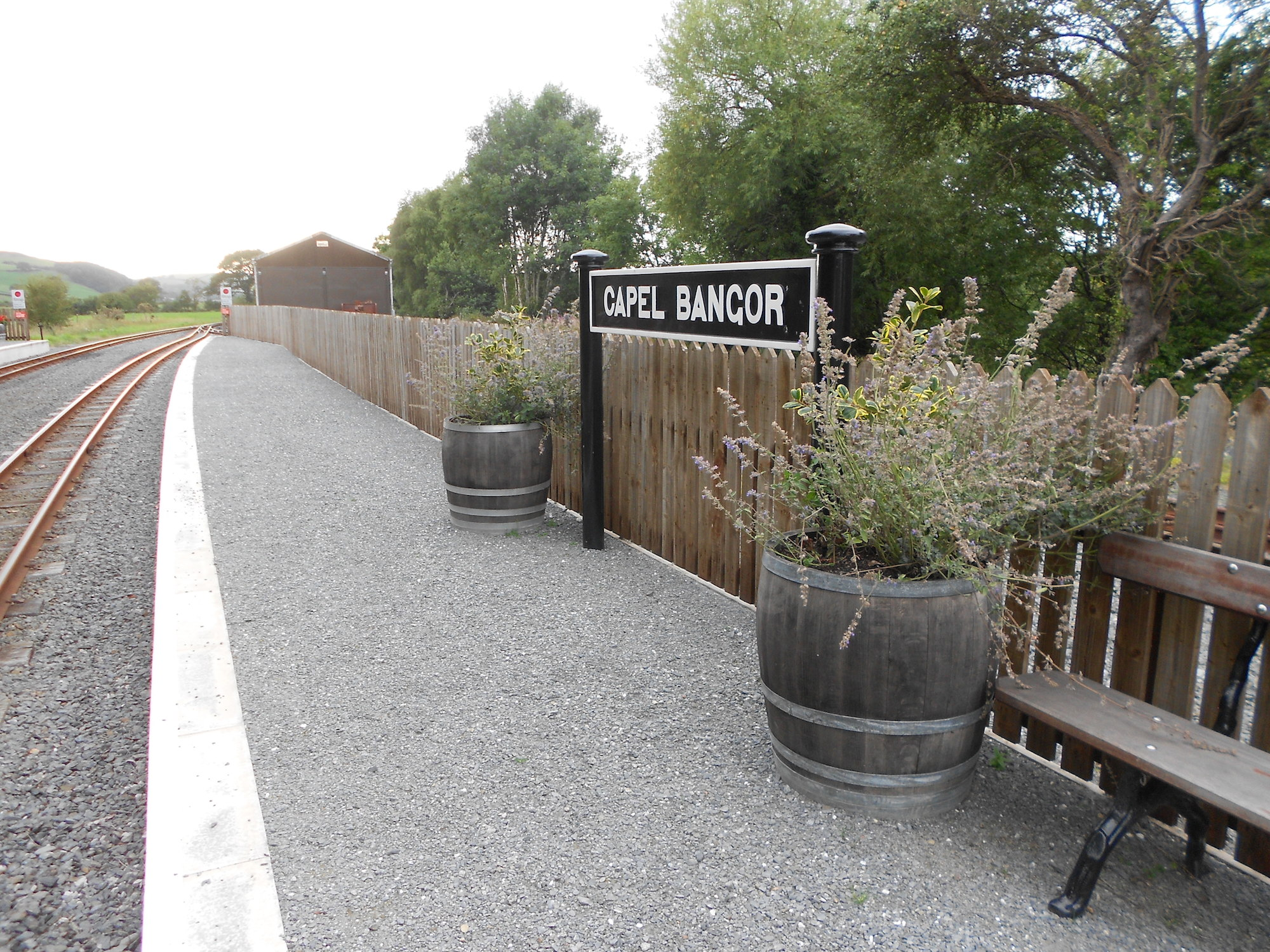
- Platforms and station nameboard, looking towards Aberystwyth

General information
- Location: Capel Bangor, Ceredigion; Wales
- Coordinates: 52.399300°N 3.988840°W
- Grid reference: SN647797
- System: Station on heritage railway
- Manager: Vale of Rheidol Railway
- Platforms: 2

Key dates
- 1902: Station opens
- 31 August 1939: Station closes due to World War 2
- 23 July 1945: Station reopens
Location

Capel Bangor railway station is a railway station serving Capel Bangor in Ceredigion in Mid-Wales. It is an intermediate station on the preserved Vale of Rheidol Railway. Facilities include a passing loop (allowing two trains to pass in opposite directions) and sidings which also link the main running line with a storage shed. There is a station building, the current structure being completed in 2013.

== History and description ==

The village community at Capel Bangor was once much larger than it is today, and in the earliest days of the Vale of Rheidol Railway Capel Bangor was the third principal station along with the two termini. It had a resident Station Master, and was equipped with waiting shelters, booking office, passing loop, sidings, and a large carriage shed. These facilities were all removed with the gradual decline of the village population, although in the 1980s British Rail, then the operators of this line, rebuilt a stone waiting shelter, and provided a picnic area for passengers alighting from trains here.

In 2001 the new operator embarked upon a process of restoration of operating facilities at Capel Bangor. The passing loop was restored, as was a single carriage siding, accessed 'out and back' via a lengthy headshunt. Subsequently, the 1980s waiting shelter was demolished, but the single carriage siding was joined by a second, parallel line (accessed via the same headshunt), and a large modern train shed was constructed.

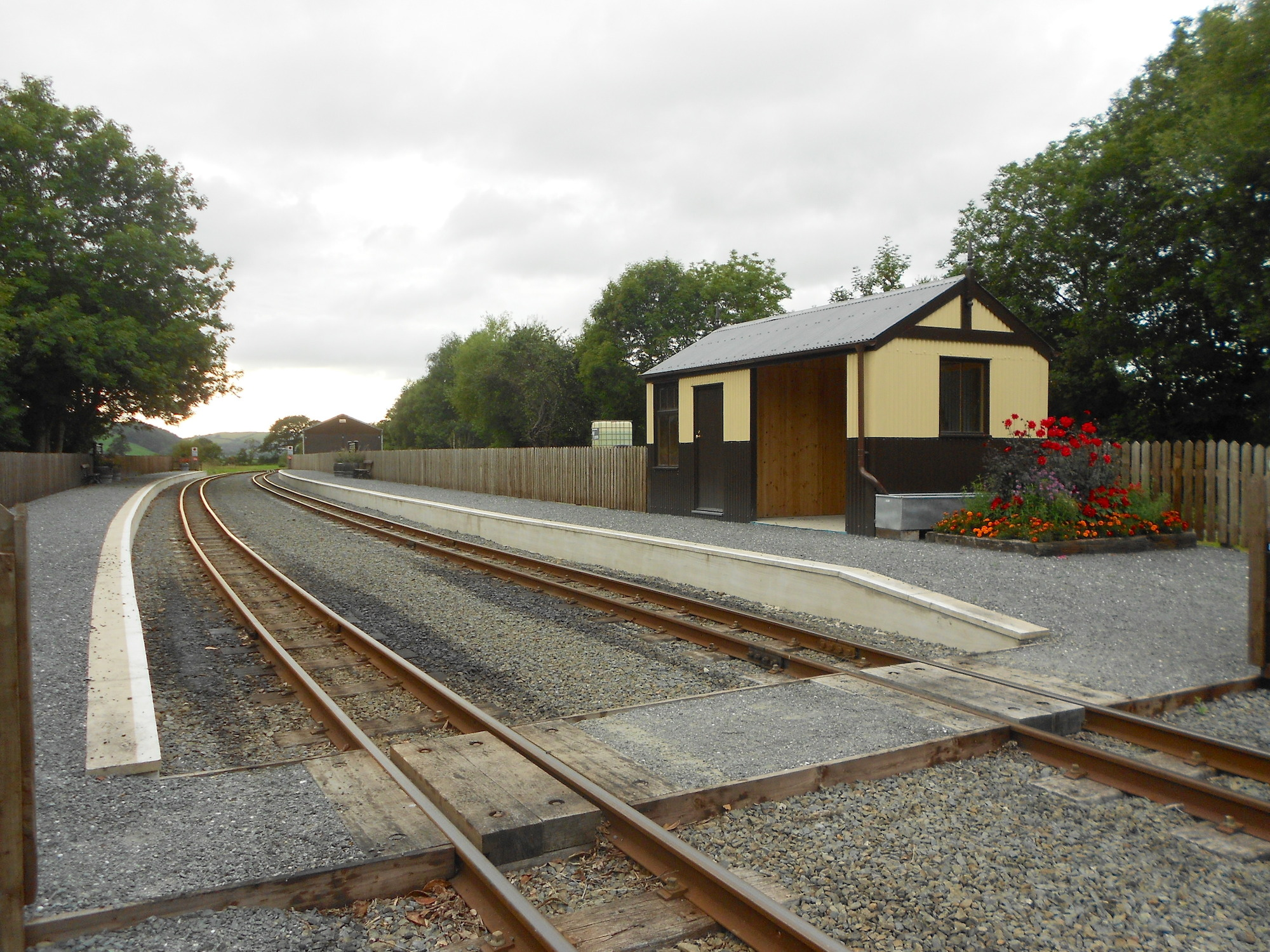
A panoramic view of Capel Bangor railway station showing the developments of 2012-2013 funded by the European Union.

== European Union funding ==
In 2012 a substantial grant from the European Union for infrastructure development in rural communities led to the Vale of Rheidol Railway making substantial investment in its smaller stations. At Capel Bangor this funding allowed for the construction of two raised and surfaced platforms, permitting passengers to join or alight from trains on the level, and also the construction of a station building, based upon one of the station's original structures. Funding also permitted fencing work, and the development of a station garden. The new station building includes an open waiting shelter for passengers, and a station office. The facilities were completed in time for the 2013 operating season.

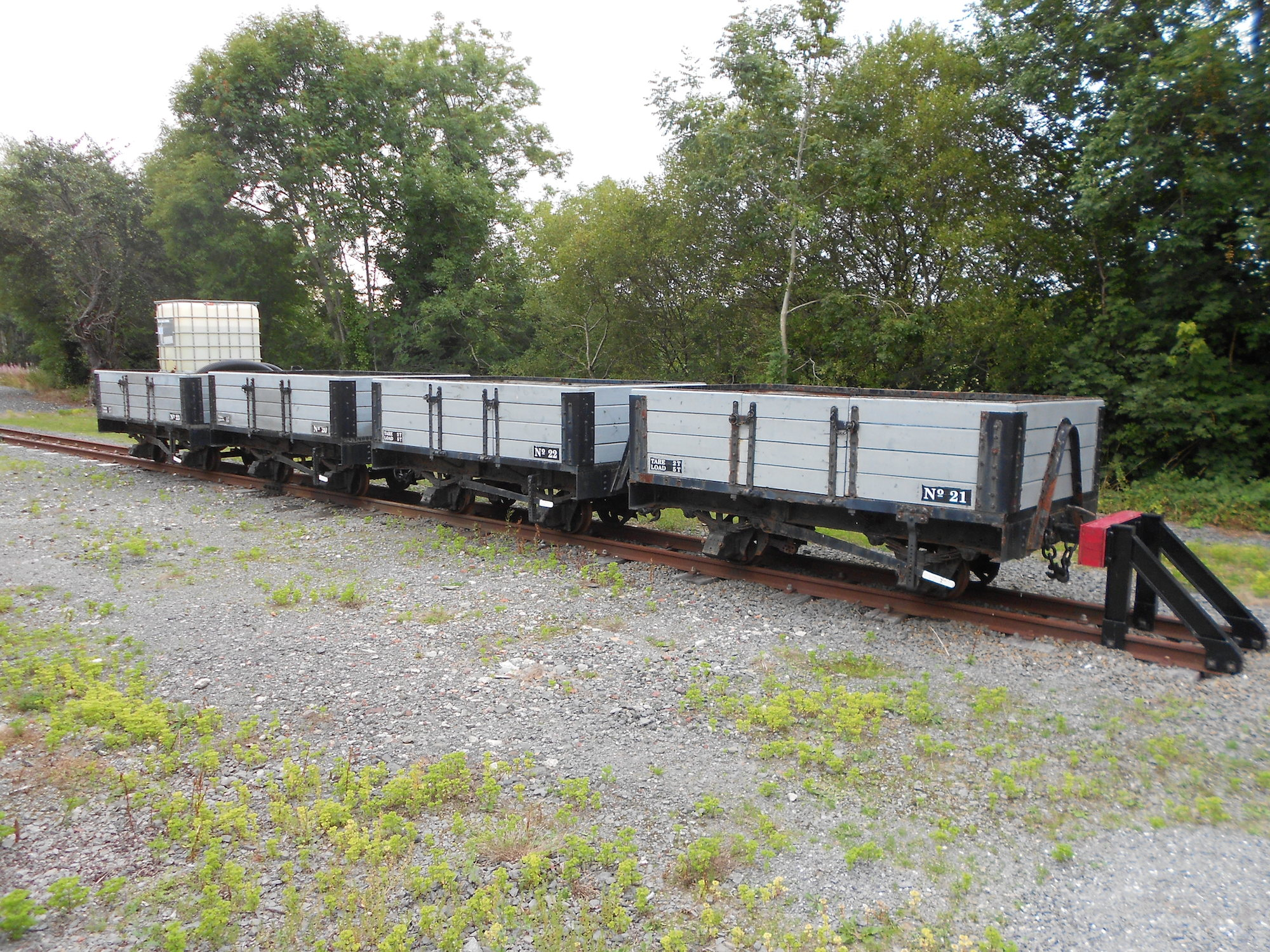
A row of open trucks in a siding at Capel Bangor railway station

Preceding station	Heritage railways	Following station
Glanyrafon towards Aberystwyth	Vale of Rheidol Railway	Nantyronen towards Devil's Bridge
