= Llanbadarn railway station =

Railway station in Ceredigion, Wales

Llanbadarn
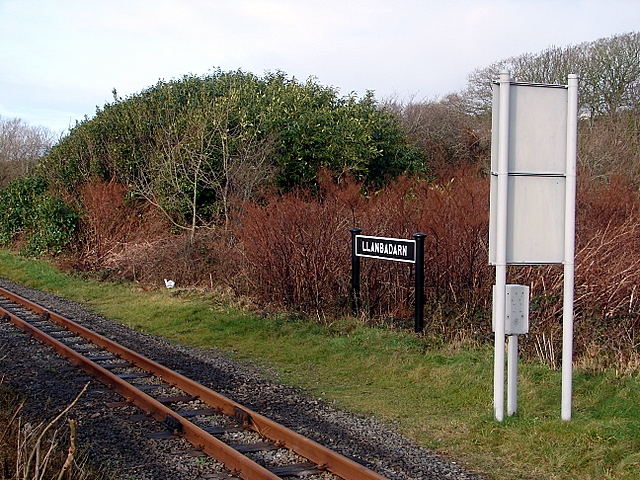
- Llanbadarn Station looking towards Aberystwyth.

General information
- Location: Llanbadarn Fawr, Ceredigion; Wales
- Coordinates: 52.405748°N 4.061228°W
- System: Station on heritage railway
- Manager: Vale of Rheidol Railway
- Platforms: 1

Key dates
- 1902: Station opens
- 31 August 1939: Station closes due to World War 2
- 23 July 1945: Station reopens
- 1989: VoR privatised
Location

Llanbadarn railway station is a railway station serving the ancient villages of Llanbadarn Fawr and Pwllhobi near Aberystwyth in Ceredigion in Mid-Wales. It is a request stop on the preserved Vale of Rheidol Railway. Alighting passengers are required to step down onto the grass as there is no platform. Tickets can be purchased from the guard.

The station is at the end of a section of line from Aberystwyth that is right next to the Cambrian Line. It is also by a level crossing of the A4120. All trains towards Devil's Bridge pause briefly here to activate the level crossing before proceeding.

Approximately 400 yards beyond the station in the direction of Devil's Bridge is a wooden trestle bridge, the only bridge over the river Rheidol on the line.

Llanbadarn station saw record numbers of passengers in 1957 when the Royal Welsh Agricultural Show was held at the nearby Blaendolau Fields. The railway ran a special top-and-tailed shuttle service between Aberystwyth and Llanbadarn.

Preceding station	Heritage railways	Following station
Aberystwyth Terminus	Vale of Rheidol Railway	Glanyrafon towards Devil's Bridge

== Bibliography ==
- Green, CC (1986). The Vale of Rheidol Light Railway. Wild Swan. ISBN 0-906867-43-6.
- Johnson, Peter (2011). An Illustrated History of the Great Western Narrow Gauge. OPC. ISBN 978-0-86093-636-7.
- Vale of Rheidol Railway Guide Book
