= Devil's Bridge railway station =

Heritage railway station in Ceredigion, Wales

Devil's Bridge Welsh: Pontarfynach
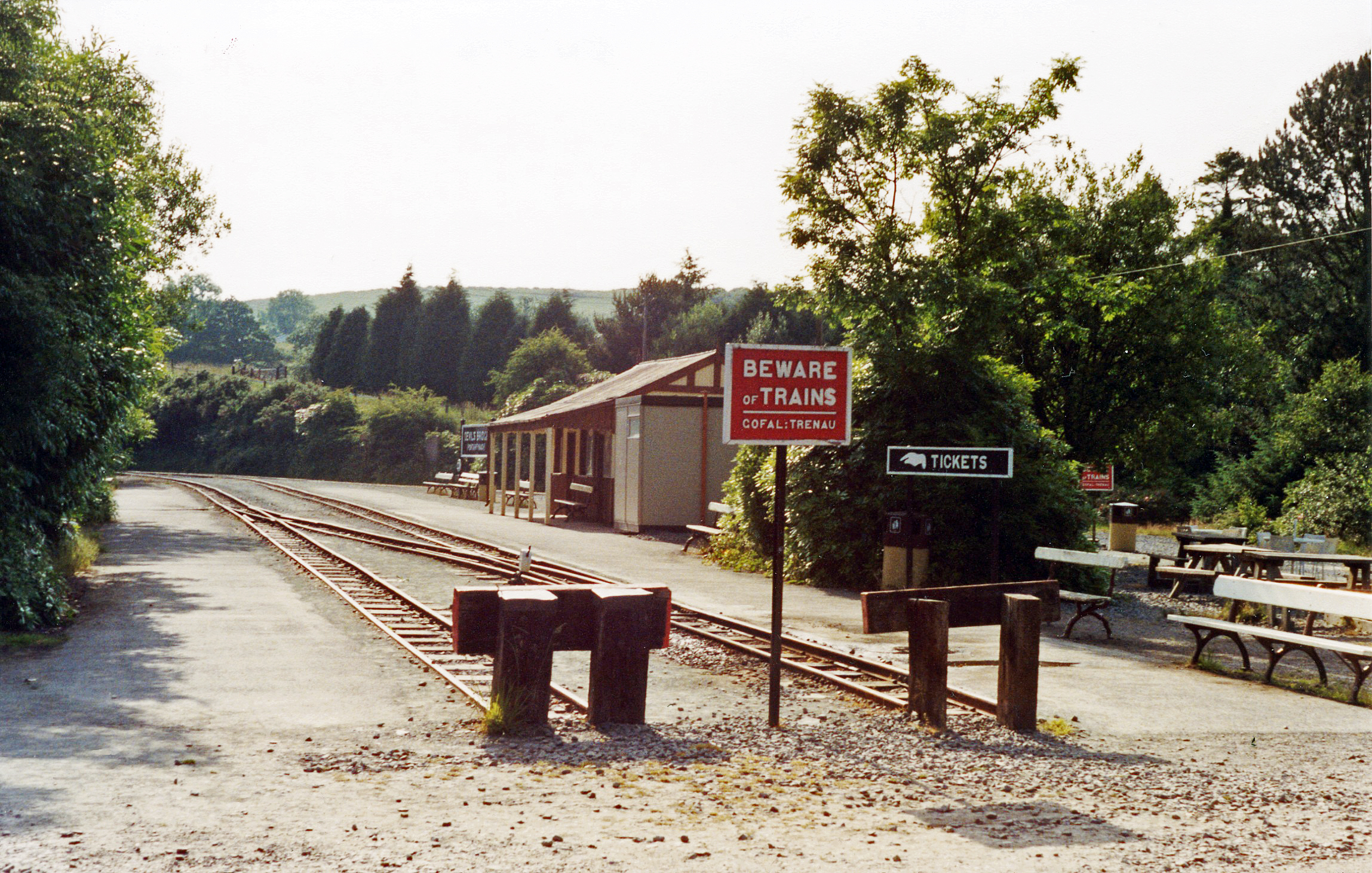
- The station, with the two platforms in use

General information
- Location: Devil's Bridge, Ceredigion, Wales
- Coordinates: 52.376051°N 3.854077°W
- Grid reference: SN738769
- System: Station on a heritage railway
- Manager: Vale of Rheidol Railway
- Platforms: 2

Key dates
- 1902: Station opened
- 31 August 1939: Station closed due to World War II
- 23 July 1945: Station reopened
- 1989: VoR privatised
Location

Devil's Bridge is a heritage railway station that serves the village of Devil's Bridge, in Ceredigion, Wales. It is the eastern terminus of the preserved Vale of Rheidol Railway, which was built to carry lead ore and timber, as well as tourists.

== History ==
The Vale of Rheidol Railway is a narrow gauge railway that was established in 1897; the line was first opened to the public on 22 December 1902. Devil’s Bridge station opened at the same time, along with Nantyronen, Capel Bangor and Llanbadarn; Aberystwyth had already been in operation since 1864.

The line climbs steeply to the elevated terminus at Devil’s Bridge. This gradient worked in favour of trains carrying ore and timber down to the sea. Much of the timber became pit props in South Wales; tourists, on the other hand, expected to be hauled up to Devil’s Bridge as well as back.

In the 1920s, the Great Western Railway provided two new steam locomotives and improved one of the original locos to match. Those GWR machines still haul trains full of tourists to Devil’s Bridge and back.

== Layout ==
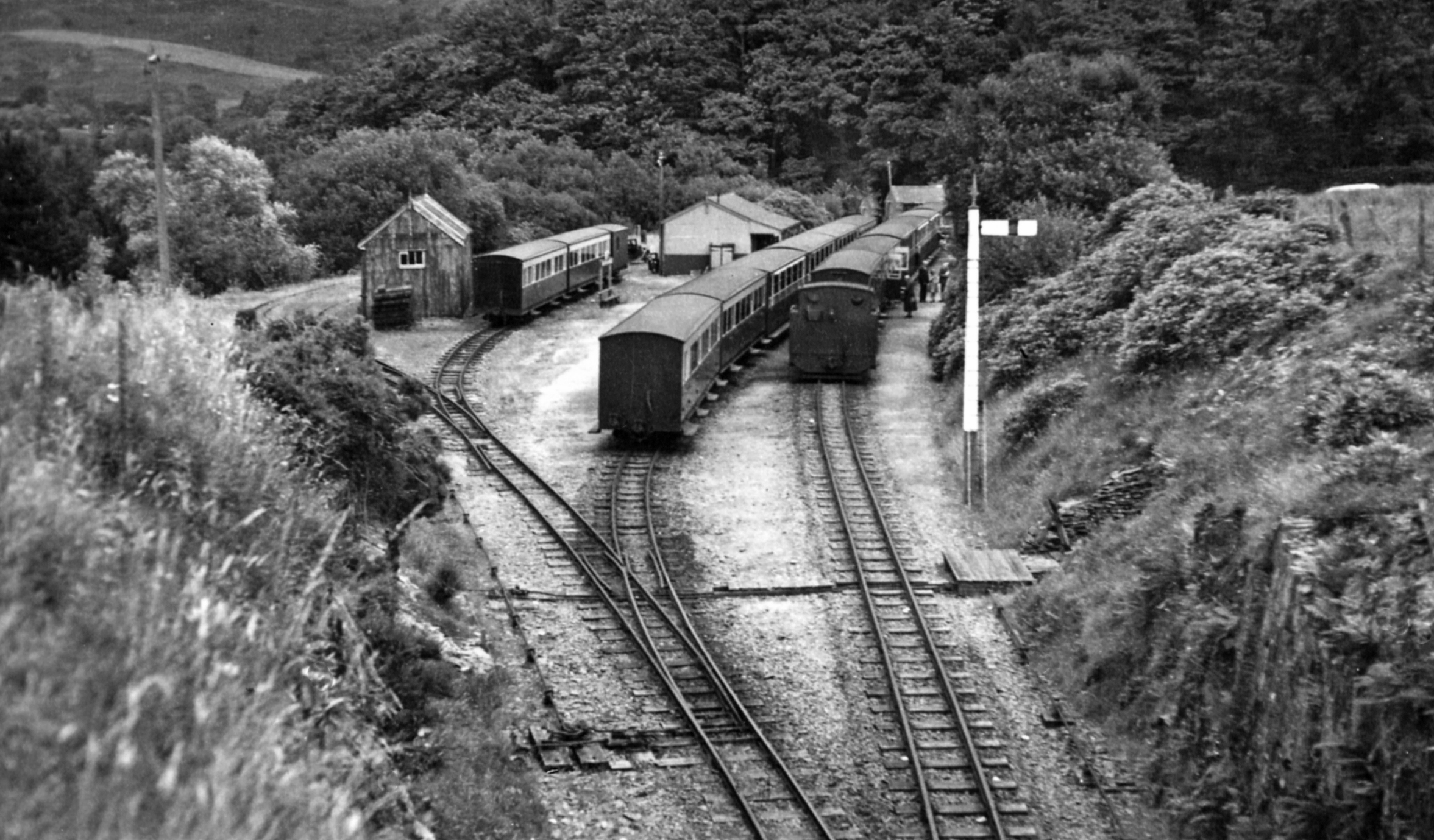
Devil's Bridge station, 1952

The station has two platforms, although one has been disused for many years. Following developments in 2012-13 funded by the European Union, there is now a raised platform which has improved access on and off carriages. The two platform lines both terminate in buffer stops and each has a headshunt forward of bi-directional cross-over points for locomotive release.

There used to be a siding, but this has now been relaid as a demonstration line, running around the perimeter of the site; it is physically separate from the main running line.

Under British Rail's ownership, the passing loops at Capel Bangor and Aberffrwd were removed; passenger trains used to cross at Devil's Bridge and so it was not uncommon to see three trains at the station at once. These loops have now been reinstated, but the current method of working only permits one train at a time to be at Devil's Bridge.

The station is equipped with a water tower.

== Engine shed ==
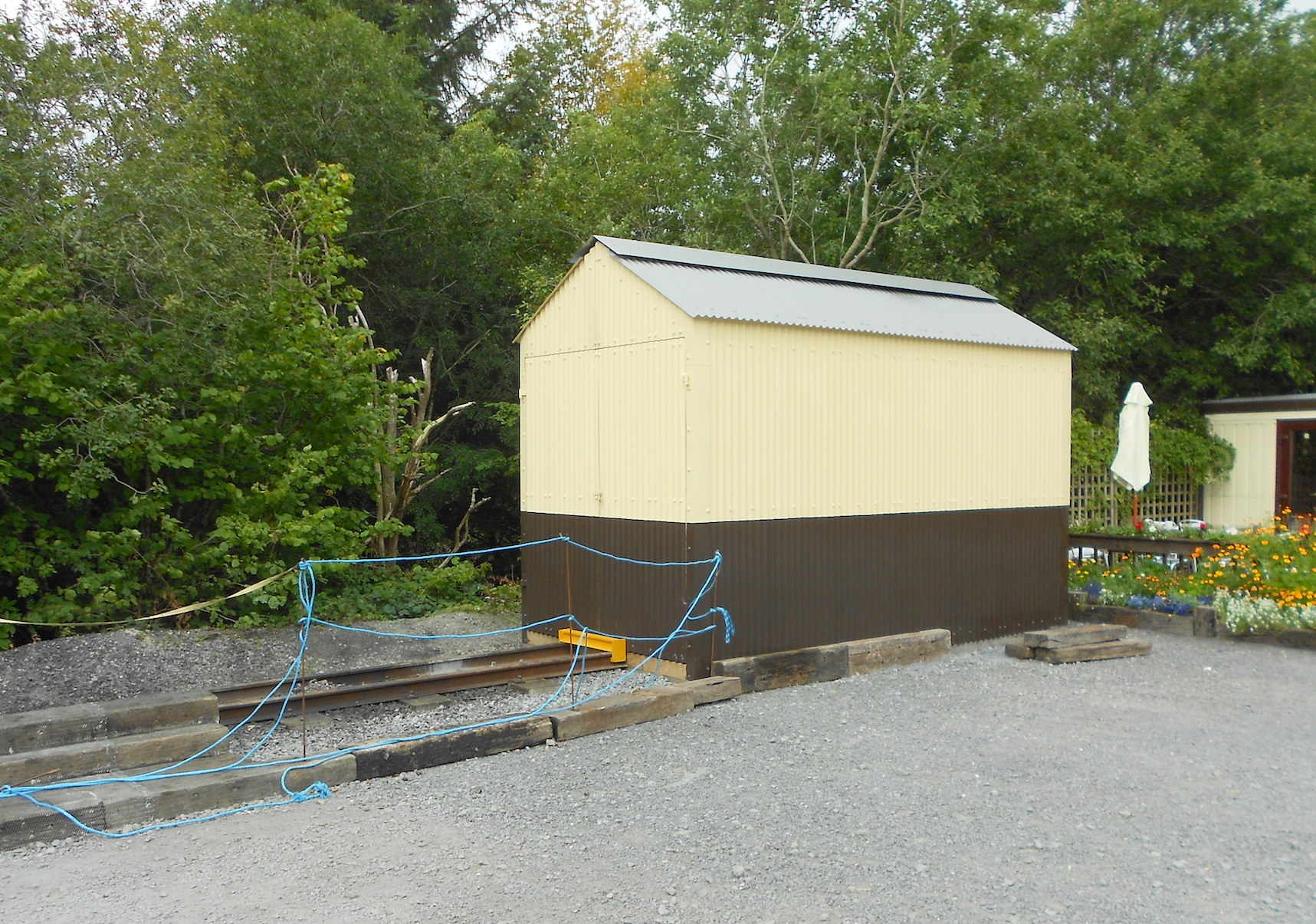
The small engine shed

There is a small engine shed at Devil's Bridge; it is considerably too small to accommodate any of the line's principal locomotives. It typically houses one of the locomotives from the railway's museum fleet, either Wren 3114 or Quarry Hunslet Margaret. The locomotive is steamed on some high season operating days to provide footplate rides along a short demonstration line, as an additional station attraction.

== Facilities ==
The main station building is a Grade II listed structure and is the last remaining station building of original type on any narrow gauge railway in Wales. It is an original corrugated-iron terminus building, dating back to 1902.

The station building contains a booking office and a gift shop. A separate temporary structure in the car park serves as the Two Hoots refreshment room on railway operating days.

== Services ==
The timetable varies in accordance with weekly and seasonal demand. Operating days align to one of three coloured timetables: orange, blue and yellow; a special red timetable operates for a week in December, for A Ticket to Christmas.

Preceding station	Heritage railways	Following station
Rhiwfron towards Aberystwyth	Vale of Rheidol Railway	Terminus
