= Vale of Rheidol Railway =

Welsh heritage railway

Vale of Rheidol Railway Rheilffordd Cwm Rheidol
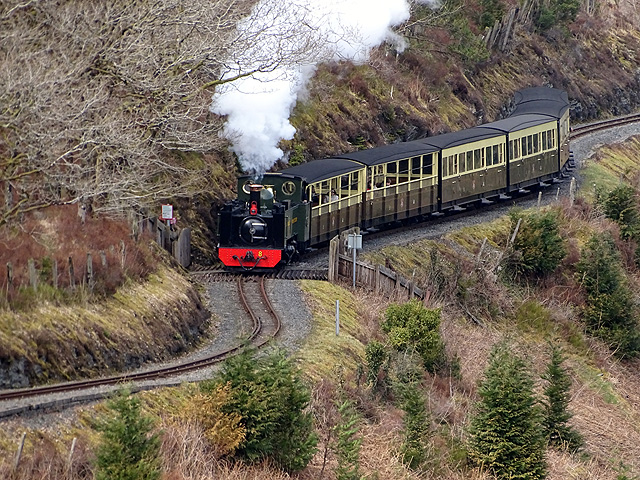
- Locomotive No. 8 Llywelyn on the climb to Devil's Bridge terminus
- Locale: Ceredigion, Wales
- Terminus: Aberystwyth; Devil's Bridge
- Coordinates: 52.41114°N 4.07909°W

Commercial operations
- Name: Vale of Rheidol Light Railway
- Built by: Engineer: James Szlumper
- Original gauge: 1 ft 11 1/2 in (597 mm)

Preserved operations
- Owned by: Phyllis Rampton Narrow Gauge Railway Trust
- Operated by: Vale of Rheidol Railway Limited
- Stations: 4 stations and 5 halts
- Length: 11 3/4 miles (18.91 km)
- Preserved gauge: 1 ft 11 3/4 in (603 mm)

Commercial history
- Opened: August 1902 (freight only); 22 December 1902 (passenger)
- 1913: Taken over by Cambrian Railways
- 1922: Great Western Railway Grouping
- 1948: Became part of British Railways
- 1968: Became the last steam operating line on British Rail

Preservation history
- 1989: Privatised
- Headquarters: Aberystwyth

Website
- www.vor.wales

The Vale of Rheidol Railway (Welsh: Rheilffordd Cwm Rheidol) is a 1 ft 11 3/4 in (603 mm) narrow gauge heritage railway in Ceredigion, Wales, between Aberystwyth and Devil's Bridge; a journey of 11 3/4 miles (18.9 km).

It opened in 1902 and, from the withdrawal of main line steam on British Rail in 1968 until privatisation in 1989, it was the sole steam-operated line on the 1948 nationalised British Rail network. It was one of the first parts of British Rail to be privatised. Unlike most other preserved railways in the United Kingdom, the Vale of Rheidol Railway did not have a period of closure between its being part of the national rail system and becoming a heritage railway, and so has operated a continuous service for residents and tourists.

== History ==
=== Vale of Rheidol Light Railway Company ===
A standard gauge railway in the Rheidol valley to the east of Aberystwyth was planned as part of the Manchester and Milford Railway route from Llanidloes to Strata Florida via Devil's Bridge. Also planned was a branch from this line from Devil's Bridge to Aberystwyth to carry timber (for pit props in the South Wales valleys) and lead ore from the Rheidol Valley to the sea and the main line railway at Aberystwyth. Many lead mines in the Rheidol valley were producing ore at the end of the 19th century, but did not have a means of transporting large quantities of ore to the harbour in Aberystwyth.

Following financial and construction difficulties, the routes from Strata Florida to Llanidloes via Devil's Bridge and branch to Aberystwyth were not built, instead in 1865 the Manchester and Milford Railway built an easier route via the Ystwyth valley to Aberystwyth. This left the Rheidol Valley and lead ore mines without a railway.

Vale of Rheidol (Light) Railway Act 1897
- Act of Parliament
- Parliament of the United Kingdom
- Long title: An Act for making a Light Railway between Aberystwyth and Devil's Bridge in the County of Cardigan and for other purposes.
- Citation: 60 & 61 Vict. c. clxxiv

Dates
- Royal assent: 6 August 1897

Text of statute as originally enacted

Gradually an alternative scheme was planned using a narrow gauge line to serve the Rheidol Valley was developed. Initially a 2 ft 3 in (686 mm) gauge was planned to be used similar to the nearby Plynlimon and Hafan Tramway. Following closure of this tramway, the gauge was changed to 1 ft 11 3/4 in (603 mm) instead. After obtaining an act of Parliament, the Vale of Rheidol (Light) Railway Act 1897 (60 & 61 Vict. c. clxxiv), it was not possible to raise finance as quickly as expected, and construction commenced in 1901. To save money, rock was hand-hewn rather than blasted. Construction was overseen by the chief engineer, Sir James Szlumper, although he left day-to-day affairs in the hands of the main contractor employed. It was during construction that the ex-Plynlimon and Hafan Tramway locomotive Talybont, regauged from 2 ft 3 in (686 mm) to 1 ft 11 3/4 in (603 mm) and renamed Rheidol, arrived on the line, where it would remain for the rest of its life.

In the Daily News of 9 August 1901 it was reported that the line was expected to be completed by March 1902 and the directors were hopeful for a free grant from the Treasury for the Aberayron Extension, which had been authorised by the Vale of Rheidol Light Railway (Aberayron Extension) Order 1898.

By the time the railway was ready to open in 1902, lead mining in Ceredigion was in steep decline. However a significant growth in tourism was under way, and the carriage of passengers soon became the principal traffic of the railway. It opened for mineral traffic in August 1902 and for passengers on 22 December 1902, using two 2-6-2T locomotives built by Davies and Metcalfe and the aforementioned Rheidol, built by Bagnall.

The original stations were Aberystwyth (located adjacent to Maesyrafon and Park Avenue), Llanbadarn, Capel Bangor, Nantyronen and Devil's Bridge (Pontarfynach). A branch ran to Aberystwyth harbour passing alongside the river Rheidol beside Riverside Terrace, underneath Trefechan bridge and behind South Road to the harbour. The final construction cost was reported as £60,000 (equivalent to £6,380,000 in 2025).

The line was moderately successful as a tourist railway although local passenger and freight traffic remained limited, to the extent that the harbour branch was very little used throughout its existence. However, efforts were made to develop the tourist service over the summer seasons with the construction of open-sided carriages and such was the level of the tourist trade the locomotive Palmerston had to be hired from the Festiniog Railway over a number of summers pre-war (1912, 1913 and 1914) and again post-war (1921 and 1922).

Towards the end of its life as an independent company, the half-year revenue of the company as reported in February 1911 was £3,660 (equivalent to £373,000 in 2025).

=== As a branch of the Cambrian Railways ===
In 1912, plans for the use of electric power from the river were considered, but never likely to have taken place due to lack of capital, and were abandoned when the line was absorbed by the Cambrian Railways on 1 July 1913. The Cambrian Railways obtained the company for the seemingly bargain price of £27,311 (equivalent to £2,720,000 in 2025), when compared with the construction cost of £69,267 (equivalent to £7,360,000 in 2025). The onset of war in 1914 closed the lead mine and passenger services were reduced, which put the final nail in the coffin of any planned improvements. The reduction in passenger services and the need for timber for the war effort meant that freight became the principal revenue source for a short while. The line also served Army training camps in the valley.

=== Great Western Railway years ===
On 1 January 1922, as part of the Cambrian Railways the line was grouped into the Great Western Railway (GWR). A new station opened next to main standard gauge station in Aberystwyth. The GWR invested quite significantly in its new asset, overhauling one of the two Davies & Metcalfe locomotives and building two brand new locomotives at Swindon, which arrived in 1923. Works records appear to show that the GWR carried out heavy repairs to the original Prince of Wales whereas in reality the locomotive was scrapped and a brand new locomotive built to replace it. Rheidol was withdrawn from traffic in 1924. New open carriages were built to replace the home-made examples used by the VoR and Cambrian, and in 1938 the closed carriages were entirely replaced by high quality modern replacements, all of which are still in service today.

The GWR recognised that traffic outside its tourist operations would be limited. After the end of 1931 the line became a summer operation only. In 1932, the one remaining original locomotive was sent back to Swindon works and put up for sale. A buyer was not forthcoming and so the locomotive was scrapped in 1935. In 1933 the harbour branch was formally abandoned. The entire line was closed for the duration of World War II, though maintenance continued. After closure for over six years, the railway reopened in June 1946.

=== Nationalisation ===
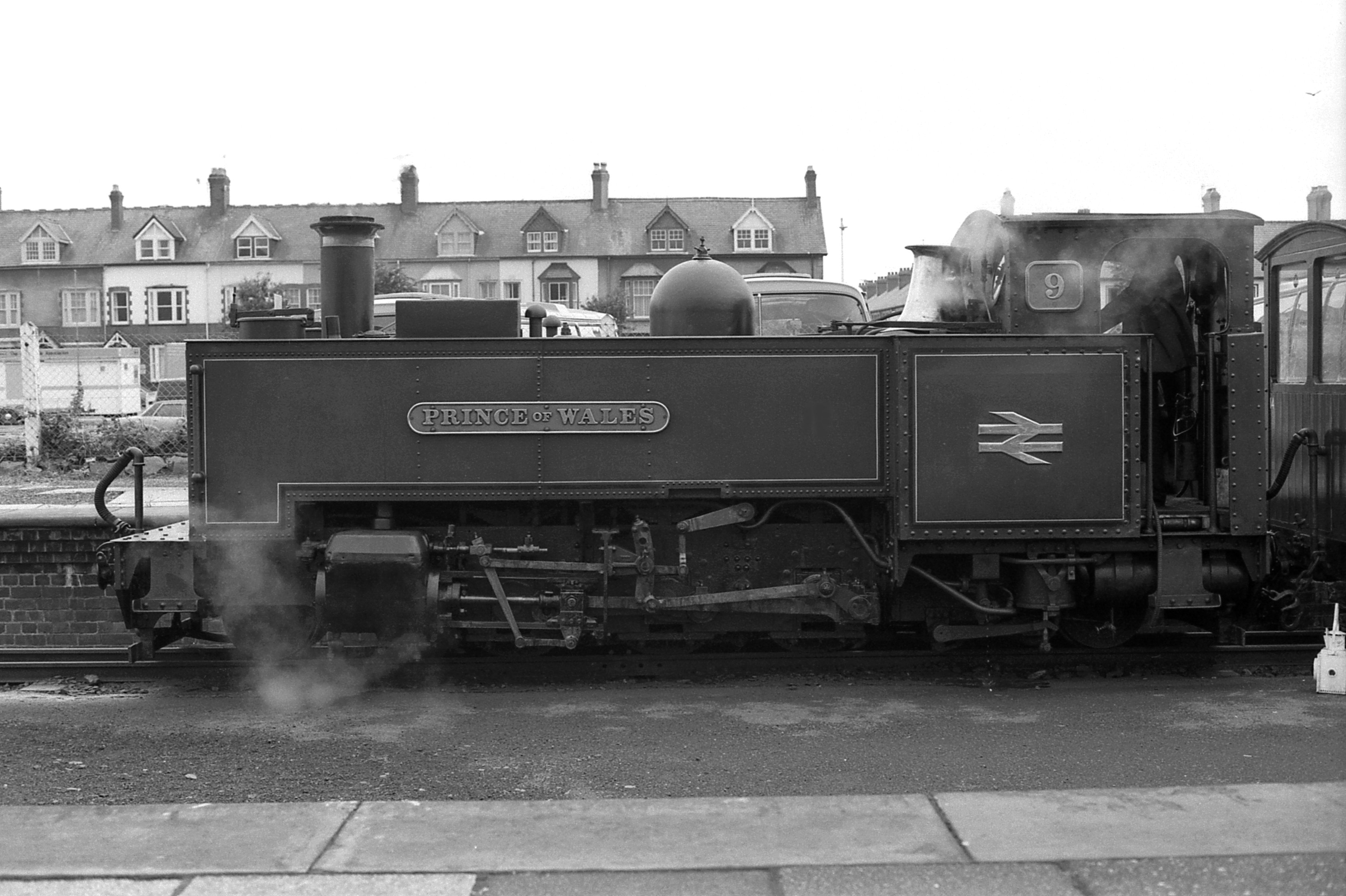
Prince of Wales with British Rail logo in 1981

The Great Western Railway became part of the Western Region of British Railways on 1 January 1948 and the line continued to operate a tourist service. In the 1950s local managers ensured that the Vale of Rheidol line remained well looked after. The coaches carried British Rail's express livery. The locomotives acquired names in 1956 and fully lined express livery for the following season.

In the 1960s, the ex-Cambrian network of Western Region was transferred to the London Midland Region. A question mark hung over the VoR's future for some time, until the Minister for Transport, Barbara Castle, confirmed that it would remain open and in British Rail's hands. In 1968, the line was rerouted in Aberystwyth to run into the former standard gauge Carmarthen line platforms of the main station, which had been abandoned in 1964. This meant that the route of the line no longer dog-legged and did not have to cross Park Avenue by a level crossing. The former standard gauge locomotive shed was also refurbished and adapted into use for the VoR. The former station site is now occupied by a supermarket and the former route was sold for redevelopment.

In the late 1960s the line's locomotives and rolling stock were painted into British Rail's corporate blue livery with the British Rail Double Arrow logo emblazoned on loco and coach sides. This was gradually improved in the 1970s with lining and other embellishments, until in the 1980s a return to historical liveries was countenanced. This, together with occasional visits by Mountaineer of the Ffestiniog Railway and special trains such as Santa specials and even simulated Wild-West style Indian attacks, helped to keep the line's attraction fresh to the public, despite declining investment which resulted in insufficient maintenance – which culminated in a derailment near Aberffrwd in 1986.

Under TOPS the steam locomotives were given the designation Class 98.

=== Privatisation ===
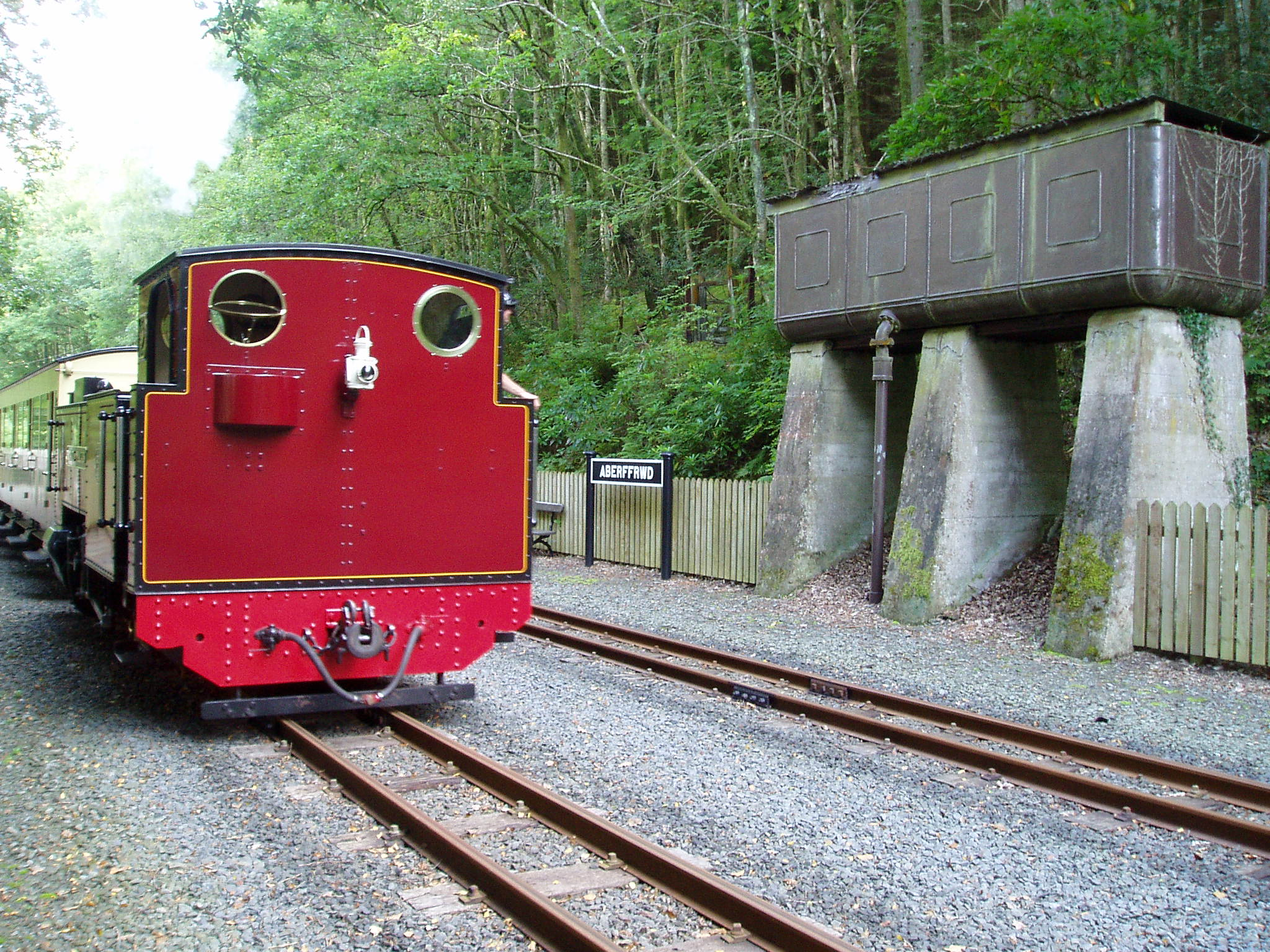
Aberffrwd Station

In 1989, the line was privatised and sold to Peter Rampton and Tony Hills (the late owner and General Manager of the Brecon Mountain Railway). In 1996, Rampton and Hills split their partnership, with Hills retaining control of the Brecon, and the Rheidol being sold to a trust formed by Rampton, the Phyllis Rampton Narrow Gauge Railway Trust.

== Brecon Mountain Railway ==
In November 2026, the Vale of Rheidol announced it had taken over the operations of the Brecon Mountain Railway bringing two narrow gauge railways under unified management.

== Today ==
=== Route ===
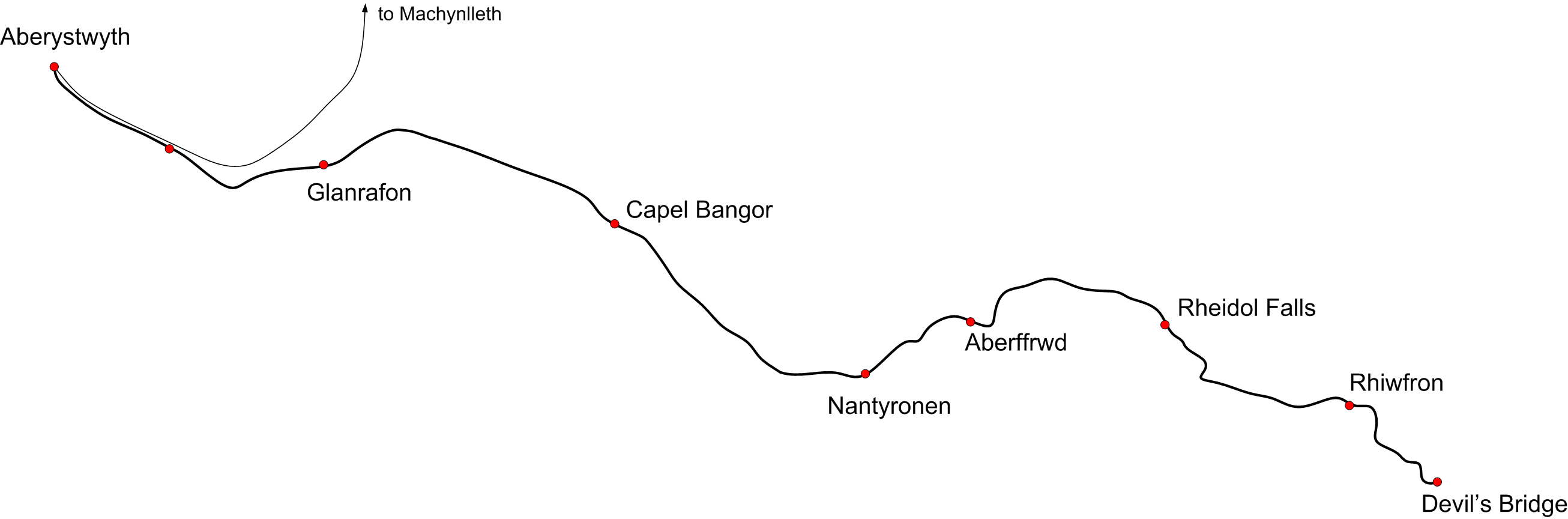
The Vale of Rheidol Light Railway in 2006

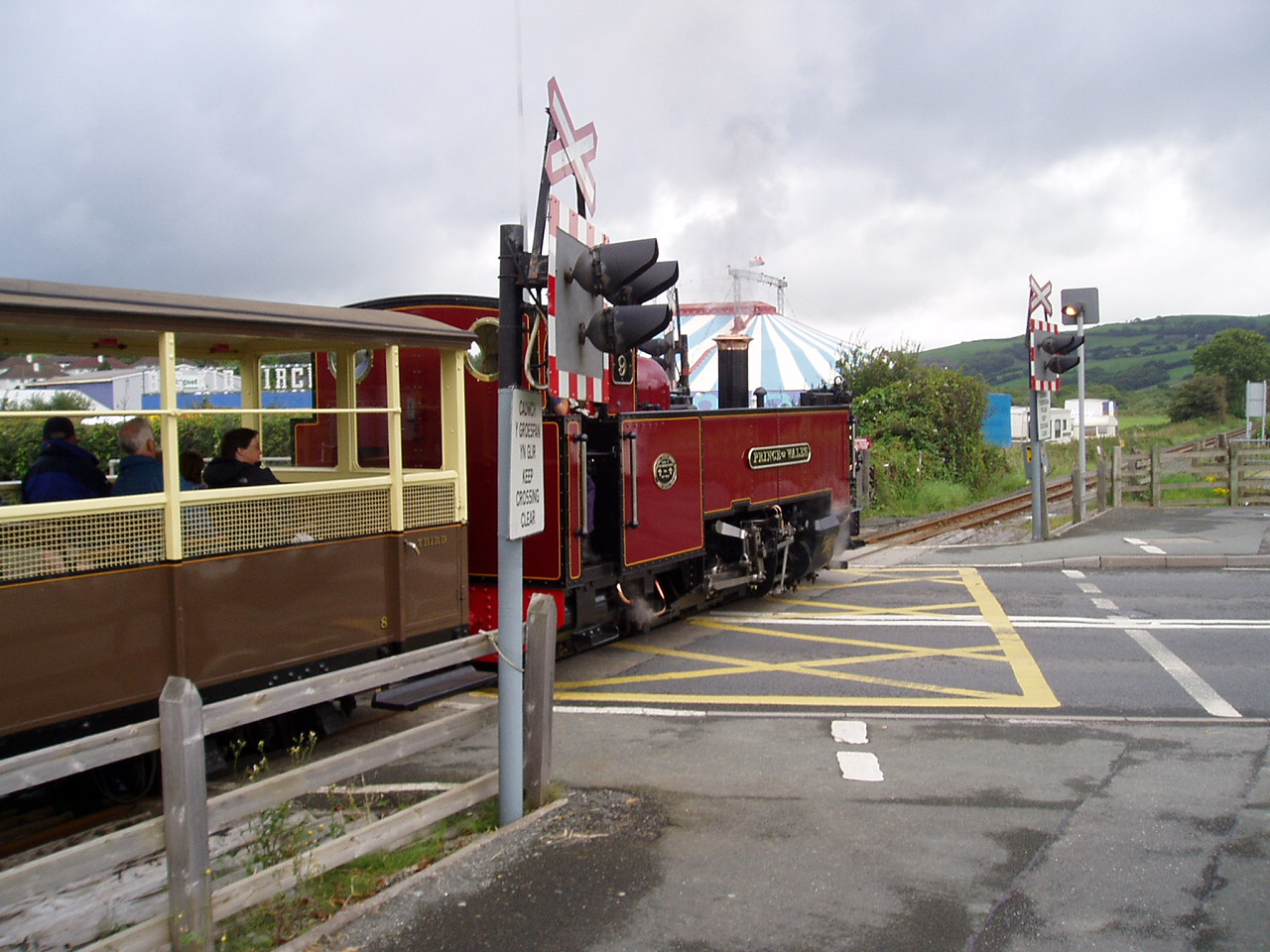
A narrow gauge train (Prince of Wales) crossing the level crossing in Llanbadarn Fawr.

Aberystwyth is the main terminus where the company's administrative headquarters and workshop are located. Leaving Aberystwyth, the line travels eastwards towards the village of Llanbadarn Fawr. There is a request stop at Llanbadarn. Trains towards Devil's Bridge pause here briefly to activate the level crossing before proceeding. A short distance from Llanbadarn, the line passes over the River Rheidol on a timber trestle bridge and then passes the Glanyrafon Industrial Estate, before heading out into the open countryside. After 4.5 miles (7.2 km) Capel Bangor station is reached. There is a passing loop here and a station building. All trains stop here.

Leaving Capel Bangor the line passes the Rheidol Riding Centre before it begins to climb steeply through the woods at Tanyrallt. After about 10 minutes the train reaches Nantyronen a small country station and request stop. Here locomotives take water from the water column before the train continues on the climb to Aberffrwd.

Aberffrwd station is 7 1/2 miles (12.1 km) from Aberystwyth, a journey time of approximately 40 minutes. There is a passing loop here and a station building. All trains stop here. Beyond Aberffrwd the line climbs at a gradient of 1 in 50 all the way to Devil's Bridge. This section of the line is isolated with no road access. The track sits on a ledge known as Pant Mawr and follows the contours of the terrain, passing through two request stops at Rheidol Falls and Rhiwfron before reaching Devil's Bridge. When the lead mines were being worked there was an aerial cableway linking them with the line at Rhiwfron.

The railway had a branch line which ran to Aberystwyth Harbour, principally for freight services. The Harbour Branch became redundant with the predominance of tourist passenger operations and was closed and lifted, parts of the tracked bed can be walked today behind South Road to the harbour.

The railway is promoted as one of The Great Little Trains of Wales, a joint marketing scheme launched in 1970 that encompasses eleven narrow gauge railways, mostly found in Wales. It continues to operate as a tourist railway, operating between Easter and the end of October, with extra services during February half-term and at Christmas. The timetable provides the operating dates.

=== Station restoration project ===
The railway carried out a major redevelopment project to enhance the facilities at many of the intermediate stations along the route. Raised platforms were built at the principal crossing and terminal stations, the first time in its history that the railway has had these. Additionally, new waiting shelters have also been provided at some locations in the style of original buildings which had been lost in previous decades.

=== Engineering workshop ===
There is a purpose-built restoration workshop at Aberystwyth which maintains the railway's rolling stock and also takes on contract work for other railways.

=== Operation ===
The operational base is at Aberystwyth, where there is an engine shed. Heavy overhauls are undertaken in a purpose-built workshop on the south side of the line.

Aberystwyth and Devil's Bridge stations have booking offices. For passengers joining the train at any intermediate station, tickets are issued by the Guard.

The railway is single track with passing loops at Capel Bangor and Aberffrwd which are operated by the train crew. The line is worked by tokens, which authorise the driver to enter a single line section. The whole line was originally worked by Tyer's Electric Staff instruments. Tokens are provided for:-

- Aberystwyth to Capel Bangor
- Capel Bangor to Aberffrwd
- Aberffrwd to Devil's Bridge

A Duty Officer is rostered whenever a passenger service is in operation. The Duty Officer regulates train running, overseeing the token signalling system and giving permission for trains to enter the single line sections, recording train movements on the Train Graph and ensuring trains are formed of an appropriate number of carriages.

=== Special events ===
The railway operates a programme of special events throughout the year.

In 2014 the line received its first visiting locomotive since the 1980s, when Palmerston returned from the Ffestiniog Railway for the first time since its original periods of hire around the First World War, and in 2015 the line held its first ever enthusiast-orientated gala event.

=== Television ===
The railway has been seen on television on many occasions, including Great British Railway Journeys and the detective series Y Gwyll filmed in 2016.

== Gallery ==
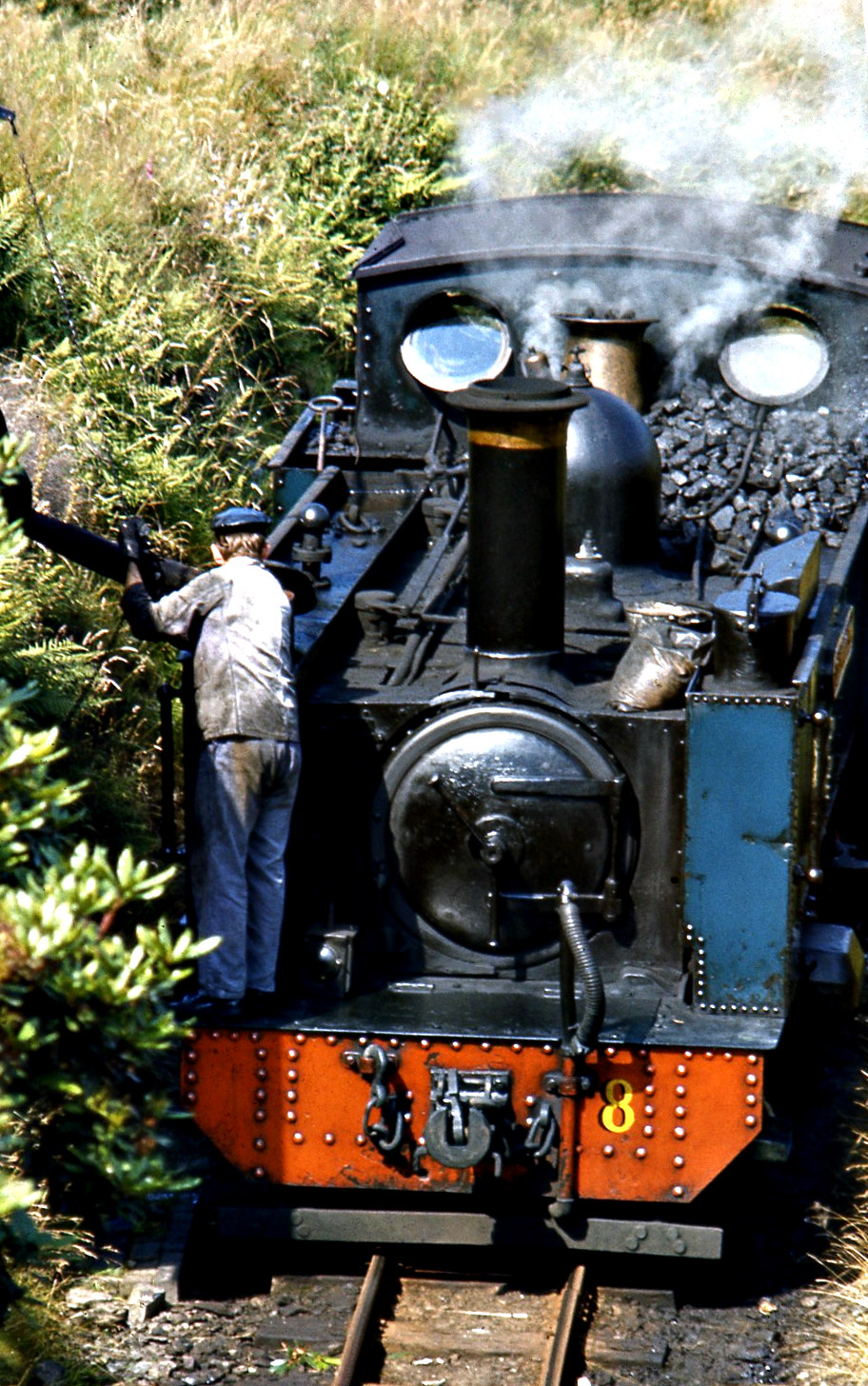
No. 8 (like sister engines 7 and 9) had probably the oddest application of the rail blue livery during the 1970s

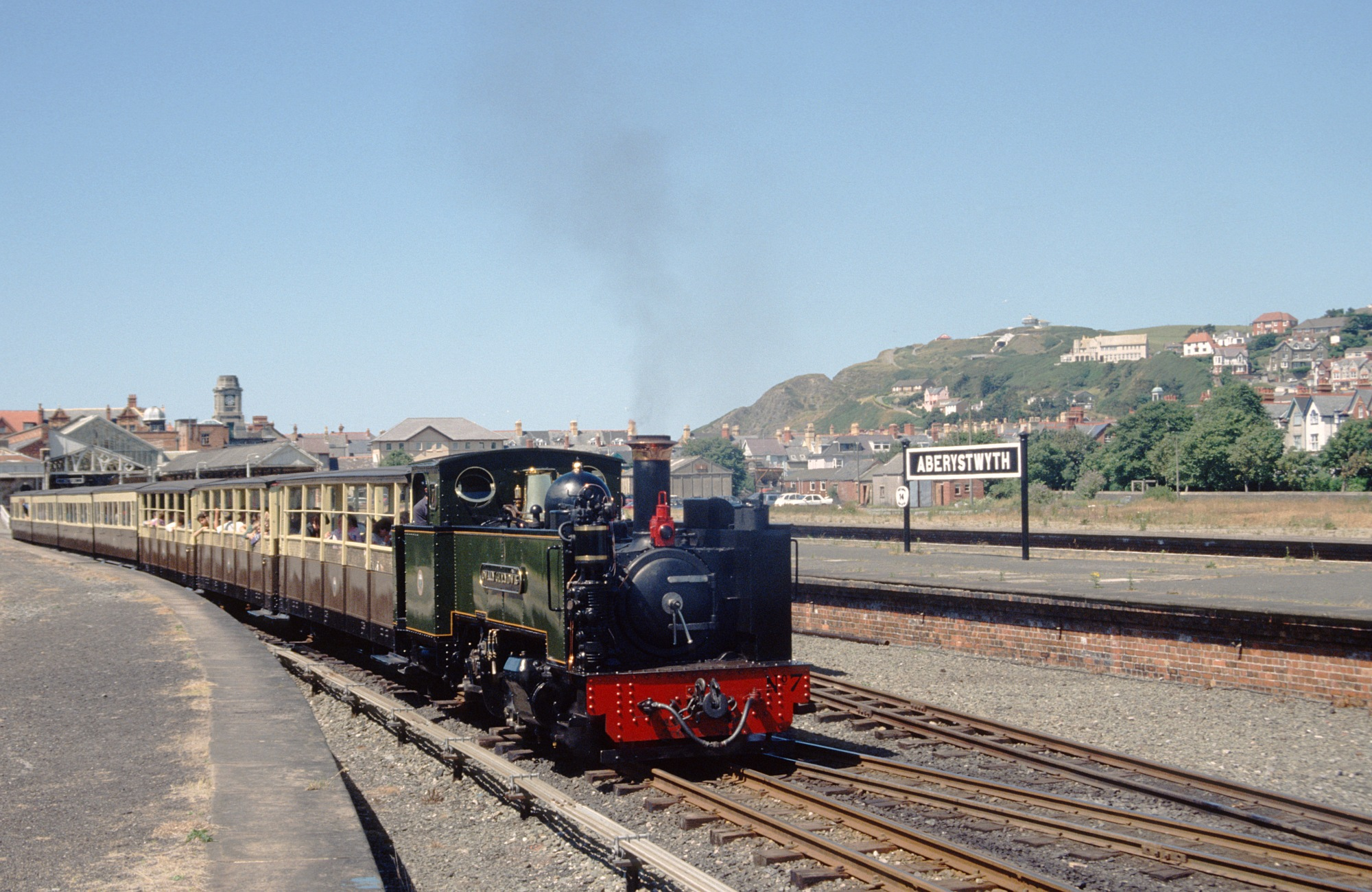
Train with No. 7 leaving Aberystwyth station

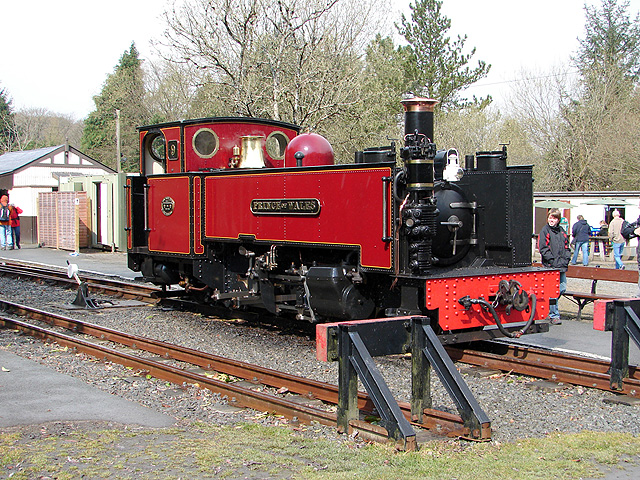
No. 9 Prince of Wales at Devil's Bridge

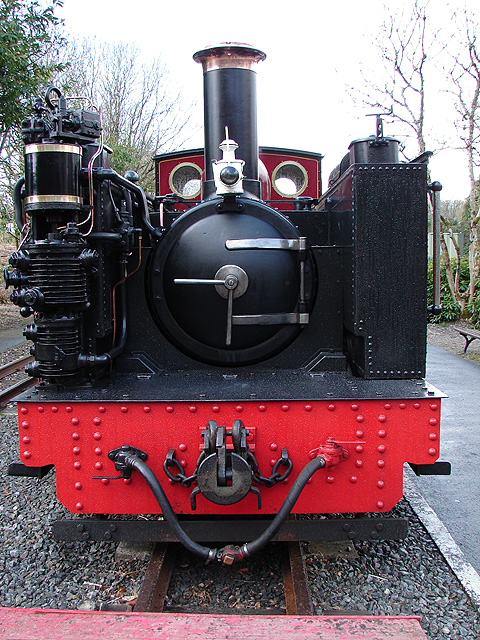
Front view of No. 9 at Devil's Bridge

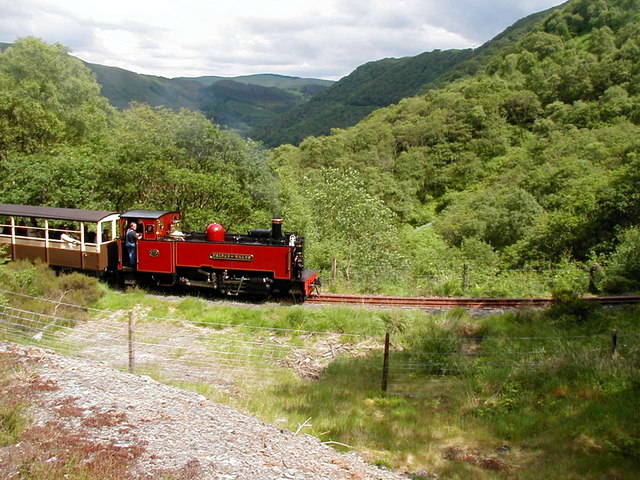
No. 9 Prince of Wales on its way to Devil's Bridge

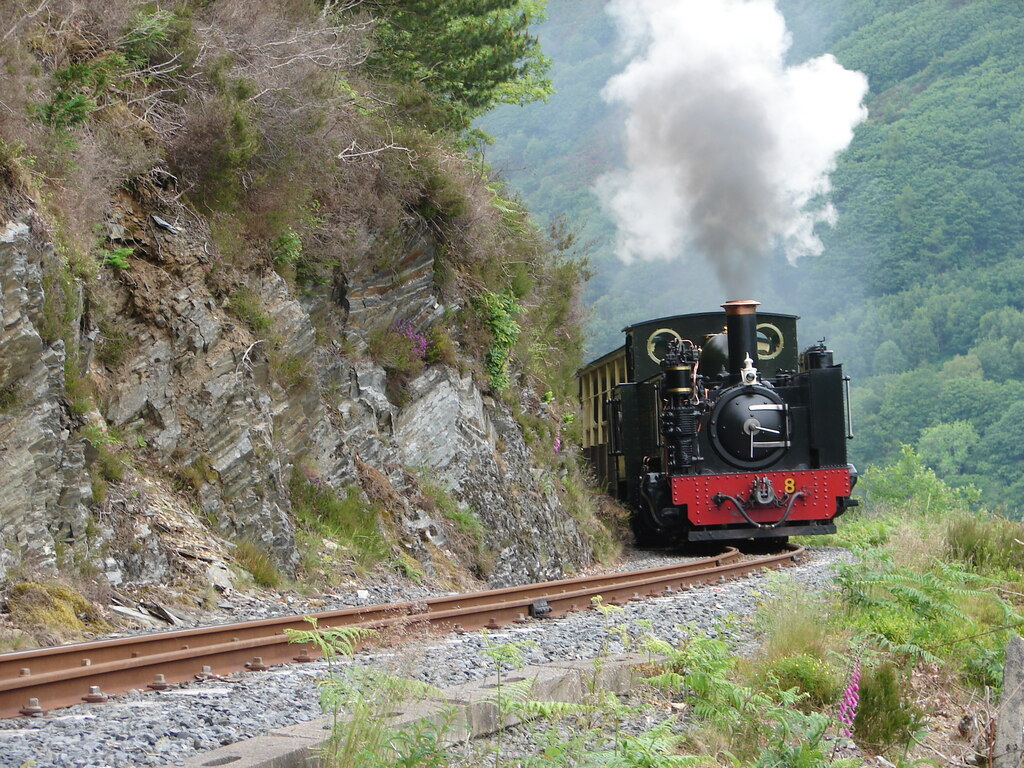

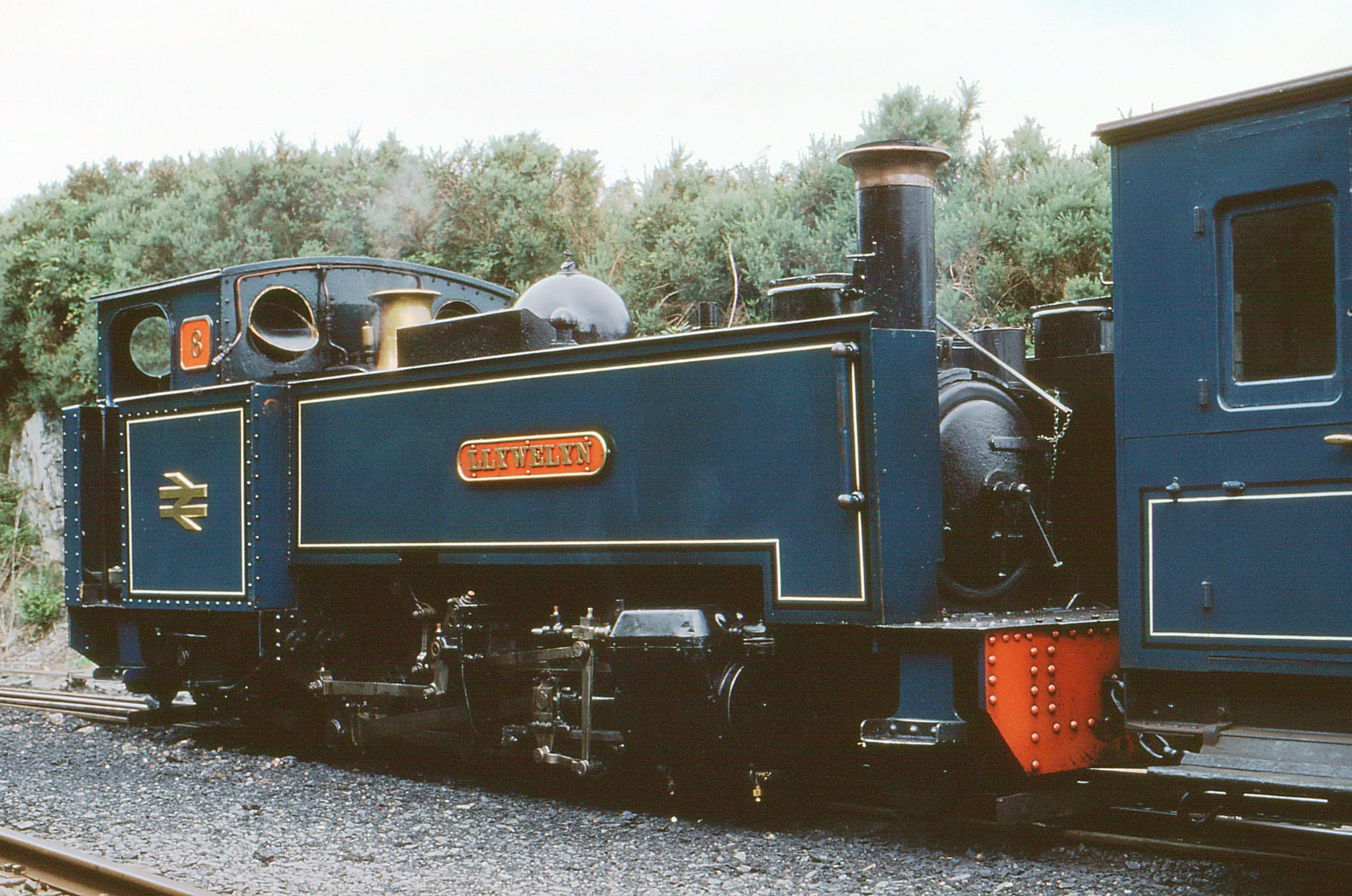
No. 8 Llywelyn with the BR-Logo (1980)

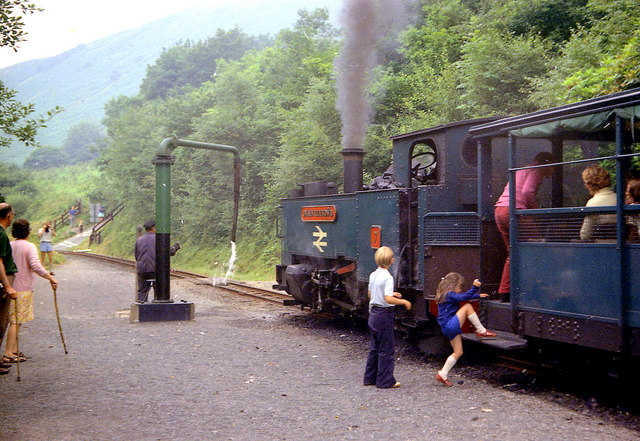
Aberffrwd Station (1974)

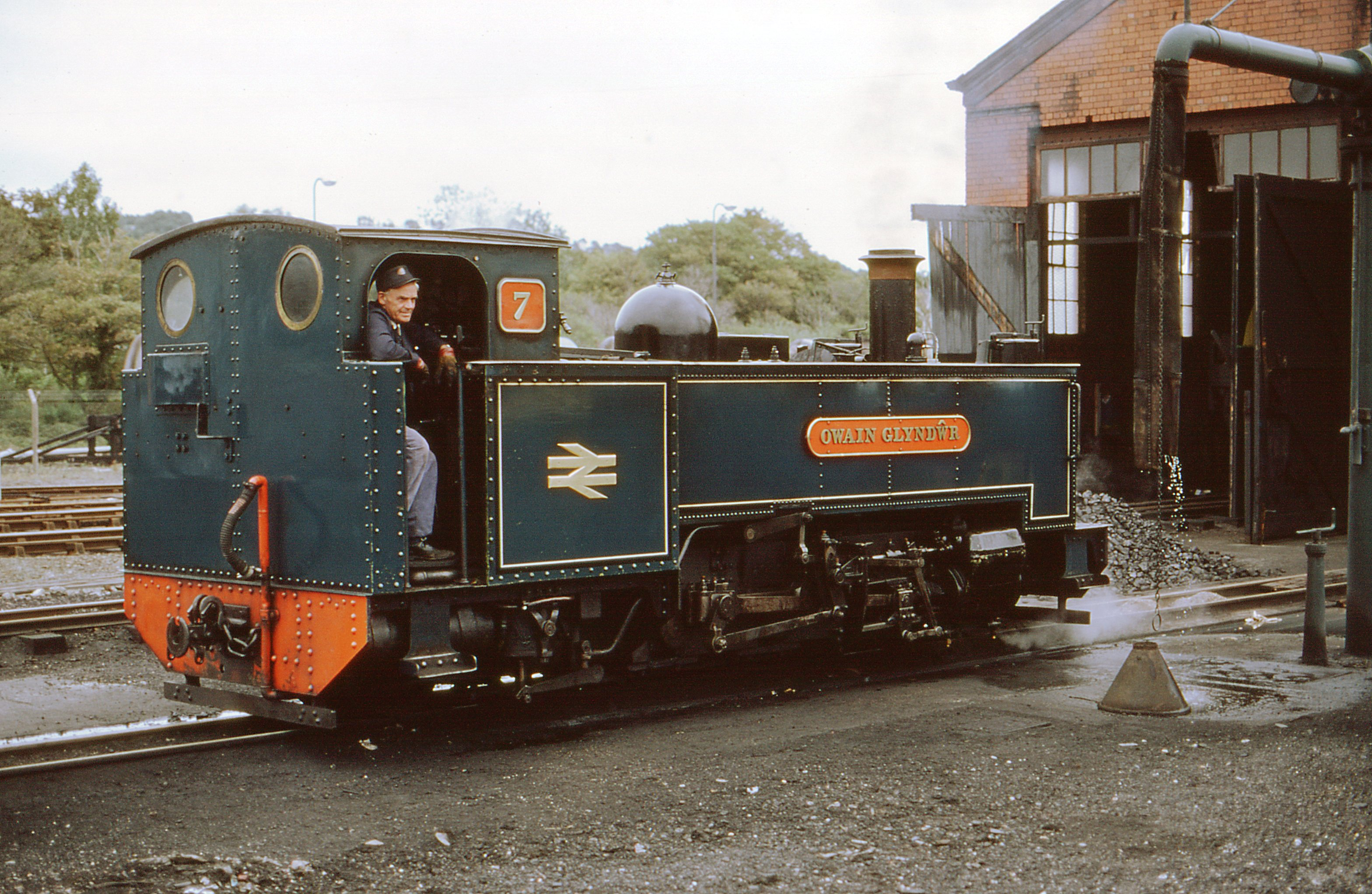
No. 7 Owain Glyndwr in BR blue steaming in front of Aberystwyth engine shed

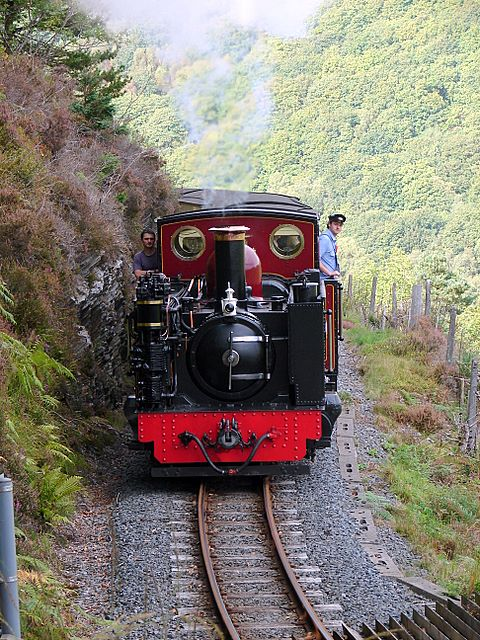
No. 9 Prince of Wales approaches a foot crossing near Coed Tynycastell

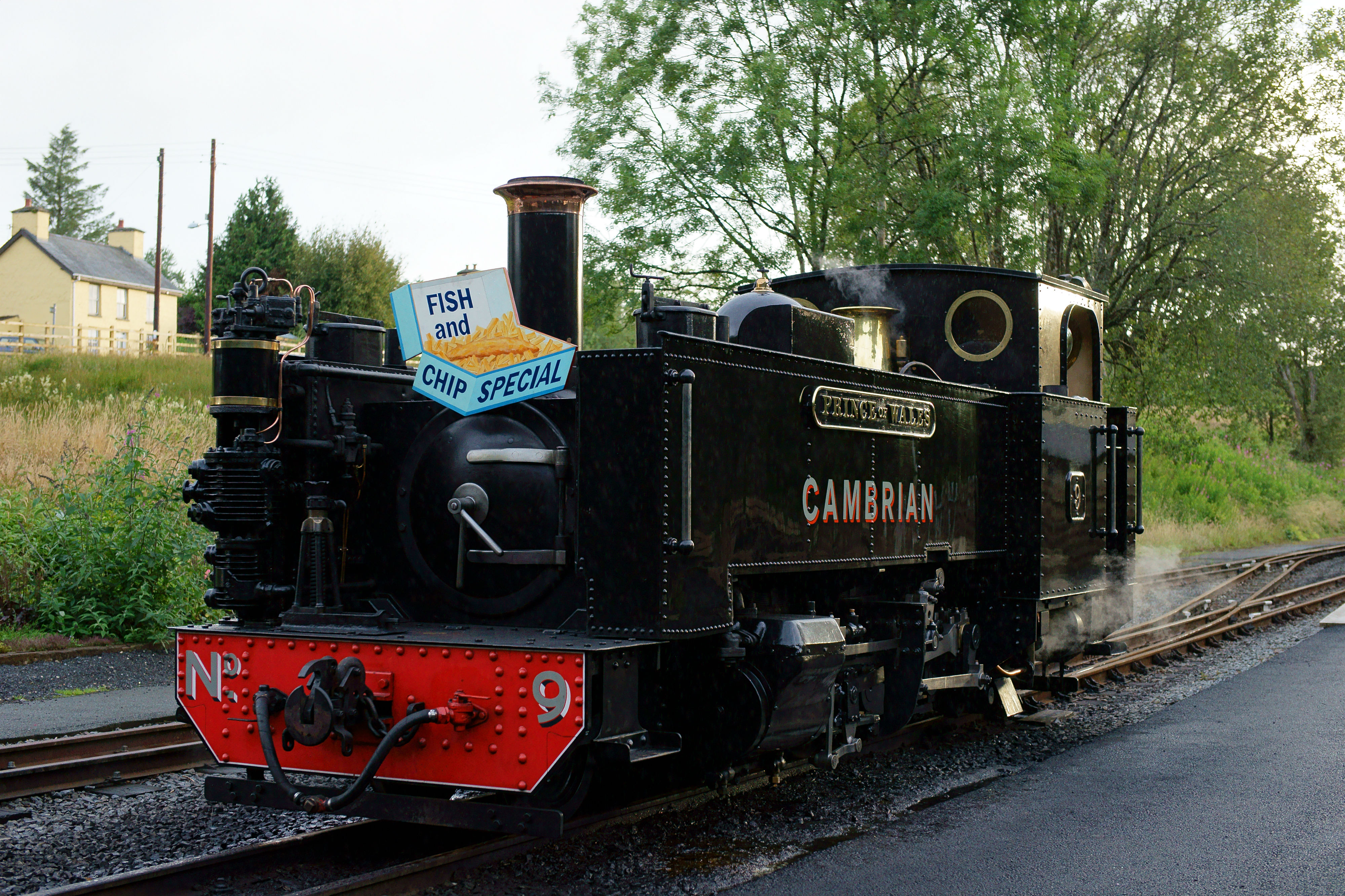
No. 9 Prince of Wales at Devil's Bridge in Cambrian Railways livery

== See also ==
- British narrow gauge railways
- Great Little Trains of Wales
- List of British heritage and private railways
- Tourism in Wales

== Bibliography ==
Books:

- Boyd, James I.C. (1965). Narrow Gauge Railways in Mid Wales. Oakwood Press. ISBN 0-85361-024-X.
- Green, C.C. (1986). The Vale of Rheidol Light Railway. Wild Swan. ISBN 0-906867-43-6.
- Green, C.C. (1993). The Coast Lines of the Cambrian Railways - Volume 1. Wild Swan. ISBN 1874103070.
- Johnson, Peter (1999). Welsh Narrow Gauge: a view from the past. Ian Allan Publishing. ISBN 0-7110-2654-8.
- Johnson, Peter (2011). An Illustrated History of the Great Western Narrow Gauge. OPC. ISBN 978-0-86093-636-7.
- Johnson, Peter (2013). The Cambrian Railways - a new history. Oxford Publishing Co. ISBN 978 0 86093 644 2.
- Mitchell, Vic (2009). Corris and Vale of Rheidol. Middleton Press. ISBN 978-1-906008-65-9.
- Wade, E.A. (1997). The Plynlimon & Hafan Tramway (2nd ed.). Twelveheads Press. ISBN 090629438-X.

Multimedia:

- Vale of Rheidol Light Railway - Through the Years - published by Oakwood Video Library, 2014.
- Vale of Rheidol Railway - A Traveller's View - published by Ffestiniog Railway Company, 2014.
