= Skelmersdale railway station =

Former railway station in Lancashire, England

Skelmersdale
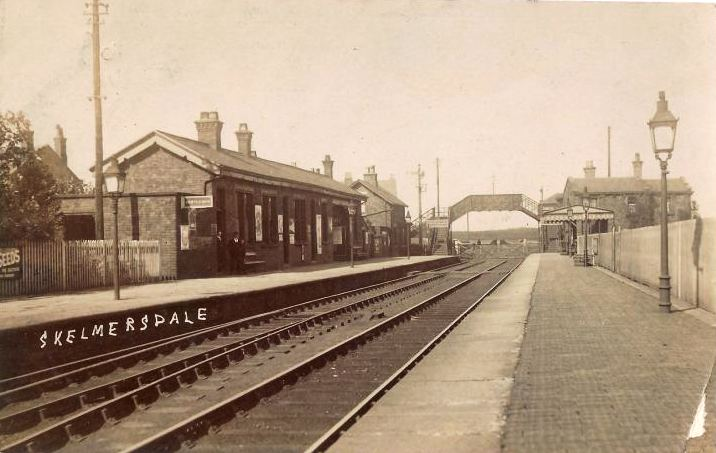

General information
- Location: Skelmersdale, West Lancashire, England
- Coordinates: 53.5506°N 2.8105°W
- Grid reference: SD464063
- Line: Skelmersdale branch
- Platforms: 2

Other information
- Status: Disused

History
- Original company: East Lancashire Railway
- Pre-grouping: Lancashire and Yorkshire Railway
- Post-grouping: London, Midland and Scottish Railway

Key dates
- 1 March 1858: Opened as Blaguegate
- 1 August 1874: Renamed Skelmersdale
- 5 November 1956: Closed to passenger services
- 4 November 1963: Closed to all services
Location

Skelmersdale railway station served the town of Skelmersdale, in Lancashire, England. It was a stop on the Skelmersdale branch, which connected Ormskirk with Rainford Junction. The station was originally named Blague Gate until 8 August 1874, and carried passengers from 1858 to 1956.

== History ==
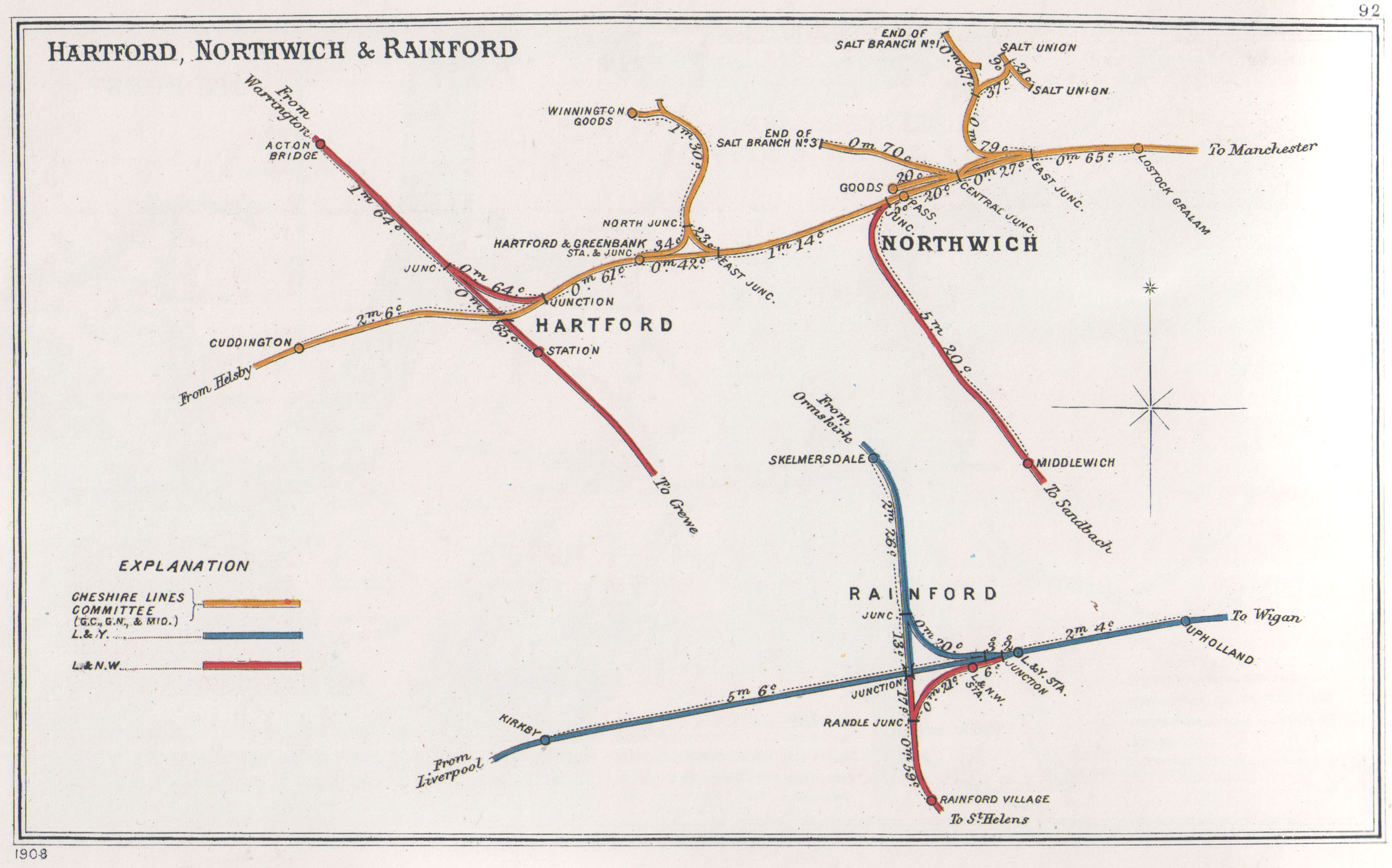
A 1908 Railway Clearing House junction diagram showing railways in the vicinity of Skelmersdale (to the lower right)

The station was one of several built by the East Lancashire Railway (ELR) on their branch line from Ormskirk to Rainford Junction. It opened on 1 March 1858, but after a year became part of the Lancashire and Yorkshire Railway system when the ELR was taken over by that company. The station consisted of two platforms with the main building on the northbound side. A wooden signal box was provided to control the adjacent level crossing, passing loop and nearby goods yard. The line towards Ormskirk was subsequently doubled in 1875, the year after the station was renamed.

Throughout its life, the route operated as a self-contained branch, though connections were available for Preston, Liverpool Exchange and Blackpool Central at Ormskirk, with St Helens Central, Wigan Wallgate and Manchester Victoria at Rainford. The service was also generous, with the L&Y running a steam railmotor service of 19 trains per day in each direction from 1906. A similar pattern continued after the route became part of the London, Midland and Scottish Railway in January 1923, but increasing road competition after World War II and the subsequent nationalisation of the railways in 1948 saw traffic levels decline.

The station was closed to passenger traffic by the British Transport Commission on 5 November 1956, with the line south to Rainford closing completely on 16 November 1961. The rest of the line followed on 4 November 1963, when goods traffic at the station ceased.

The track was lifted in 1968 and the station was demolished soon afterwards. Ironically, this was done just as the town was undergoing a significant increase in population levels and associated housing development, having been designated as one of the second wave of new towns in 1961.

Preceding station	Disused railways	Following station
Westhead Halt; Line and station closed	Lancashire and Yorkshire Railway; Skelmersdale branch	White Moss Level Crossing Halt; Line and station closed

== The site today ==
The B5312, known as Railway Road, now passes through the site; there are no traces of the station remaining. Only the nearby Railway Tavern public house, dating from the time of the railway, is still in situ.

== Reopening proposals ==
Skelmersdale has been described as the largest town in North-West England without a railway station, although Leigh is larger. There have been many discussions about reopening a railway station in Skelmersdale, which would require restoration of a three-mile railway. In January 2009, the Liverpool Echo newspaper reported that recommendations had been put to councillors to endorse the £60m plan to build a new railway station in Skelmersdale, reconnecting the town with Liverpool.

In June 2009, the Association of Train Operating Companies in its Expanding Access to the Rail Network report, called for funding for the reopening of this station as part of a £500m scheme to open 33 stations on 14 lines closed in the Beeching Axe, including seven new parkway stations. The report proposes extending the line from Ormskirk by laying three miles of new single track along the previous route to the town, at a cost estimated to be in the region of £31 million. The route is largely intact, though a deviation north of Westhead would be required. The proposed station would be on the north-west corner of town near the Skelmersdale Ring Road, right next to where the old station once was. A feasibility study on the project jointly funded by Merseytravel, Merseyrail, Lancashire County Council and West Lancs Borough Council was due to begin in the autumn of 2013.

Lancashire County Council approved the initiation of a more detailed evaluation on 1 June 2015. This option selection process would take the project to completing Network Rail's GRIP stage 3 level of development in January 2017. The evaluation was to be developed in partnership with Network Rail and Merseytravel. Network Rail suggested a construction date commencing in April 2021, with services beginning from December 2023, once the single option development and detailed design stages in the GRIP process had been achieved. The likely route for the new link was southwards to join the Kirkby branch line between Upholland and Rainford, rather than the original plans to go north via Ormskirk; this would enable trains to travel to Wigan, Manchester and Liverpool.

In February 2017, Lancashire County Council confirmed that the preferred site for Skelmersdale station was the former site of Glenburn Sports College/Westbank Campus. County Council Transport portfolio holder John Fillis said that the site "is big enough to provide a high quality station with scope to expand to meet future demand." By September, Merseytravel announced that they would be committing £765,000 to the study into the reopening, estimating that the station could be open within a decade with a lot of additional funding. Merseytravel's plan would also see a new station built at Headbolt Lane in Kirkby. It was proposed that a new station at Skelmersdale would act as the terminus for Merseyrail's Northern Line, with connections available to Wigan and Manchester. Initial estimates suggested that the scheme could cost around £300 million to develop. Merseytravel worked with Lancashire County Council and Network Rail to develop a plan to extend the Merseyrail network from Kirkby through to Skelmersdale, with work being completed in 2019. They considered third rail electrification and other alternatives, with a new station at Headbolt Lane to serve the Northwood area of Kirkby. Two trials of electric third rail/battery trains were planned to be undertaken in 2020, as one of the "alternatives".

Lancashire County Council approved a plan in May 2019 to commission an outline business case into reopening the station, which would be presented to the government.

Merseytravel confirmed in March 2021 that talks would continue between themselves, Lancashire County Council and other partners about additional funding being made available for Headbolt Lane station, further along the Kirkby branch.

On 2 November 2021, West Lancashire Borough Council were asked to contribute £43,000 with Lancashire County Council's £245,900 towards the Skelmersdale Regeneration Plan, which would include new shops and the railway station.

The government reinforced that the station proposals were being considered. The local MP, Rosie Cooper, called for the new Rail Minister to visit the town in order to aid the DfT's decision.

However, the Department for Transport announced in July 2022 that it was rejecting the Strategic Outline Business Case, throwing the scheme into doubt. The DfT instead suggested that better bus links with the Kirkby–Wigan rail line would be a cheaper way of improving connectivity for Skelmersdale.
