= Westhead (disambiguation) =

Westhead is a village in Lancashire, England.

Westhead or West Head may also refer to:

- Westhead (surname), a family name derived from the village of Westhead
- Westhead Halt railway station, a disused railway station in Westhead
- West Head, three separate headlands on New Zealand's South Island
- West Head, Nova Scotia, a community in Nova Scotia, Canada
- West Head of Papa, one of the Scalloway Islands in Shetland, Scotland
