= White Moss Level Crossing Halt railway station =

Former railway station in England

White Moss Level Crossing Halt

General information
- Location: Skelmersdale, West Lancashire; England
- Coordinates: 53.543305°N 2.804103°W
- Grid reference: SD467054
- Platforms: Two

Other information
- Status: Disused

History
- Original company: Lancashire and Yorkshire Railway
- Pre-grouping: Lancashire and Yorkshire Railway
- Post-grouping: London, Midland and Scottish Railway

Key dates
- 1 July 1906: Opened
- 18 June 1951: Closed
Location

White Moss Level Crossing Halt railway station was on the Skelmersdale branch, which ran from Ormskirk to Rainford Junction via Skelmersdale. Most trains ran beyond Rainford Junction through to St Helens. The halt opened on 7 January 1907 and closed on 18 June 1951. The line through the station closed in 1964 and was subsequently lifted. The station was demolished and its site is now buried under the M58 motorway.

== Services ==
In July 1922 16 "Up" (southbound) trains called at the station on weekdays, with an extra on Saturday evenings. All originated at Ormskirk, several with connections from Southport. Ten Up trains called on Sundays. All trains continued to Rainford Junction where a few terminated, the majority continuing all stations to St Helens. The "Down" (northbound) service was similar.

The trains all consisted of "Motor Cars – One class only". Please note that 'Motor Cars' then did not have their modern meaning, but consisted of a single railway coach joined to a dedicated steam locomotive. Their generic type is summarised in L&YR railmotors. Photographs appear in Bob Pixton's work on the line.

In 1951 the Up service consisted of nine trains on weekdays with three extra on Saturdays. The rolling stock was "Third Class Only". Of the nine trains five continued past Rainford Junction, all stations to St Helens. Eight trains called on Sundays, plying between Ormskirk and Rainford Junction only. The Down service was similar. As was often the case with such local services, these trains acquired a nickname – "The Skem Dodger".

All local trains plying between Ormskirk and St Helens called at Rainford Junction, entailing a reverse. None used the 'direct line' between Bushey Lane JunctionPixton 1996, p. 92 and Randle Junction which formed the third side of the triangle shown on the route diagram. That stretch was the preserve of goods trains, diversions and occasional specials.

Preceding station	Disused railways	Following station
Hey's Crossing Halt; Line and station closed	Lancashire and Yorkshire Railway; Skelmersdale Branch	Skelmersdale; Line and station closed
