= Ringley Road railway station =

Former railway station in Greater Manchester, England

Ringley Road
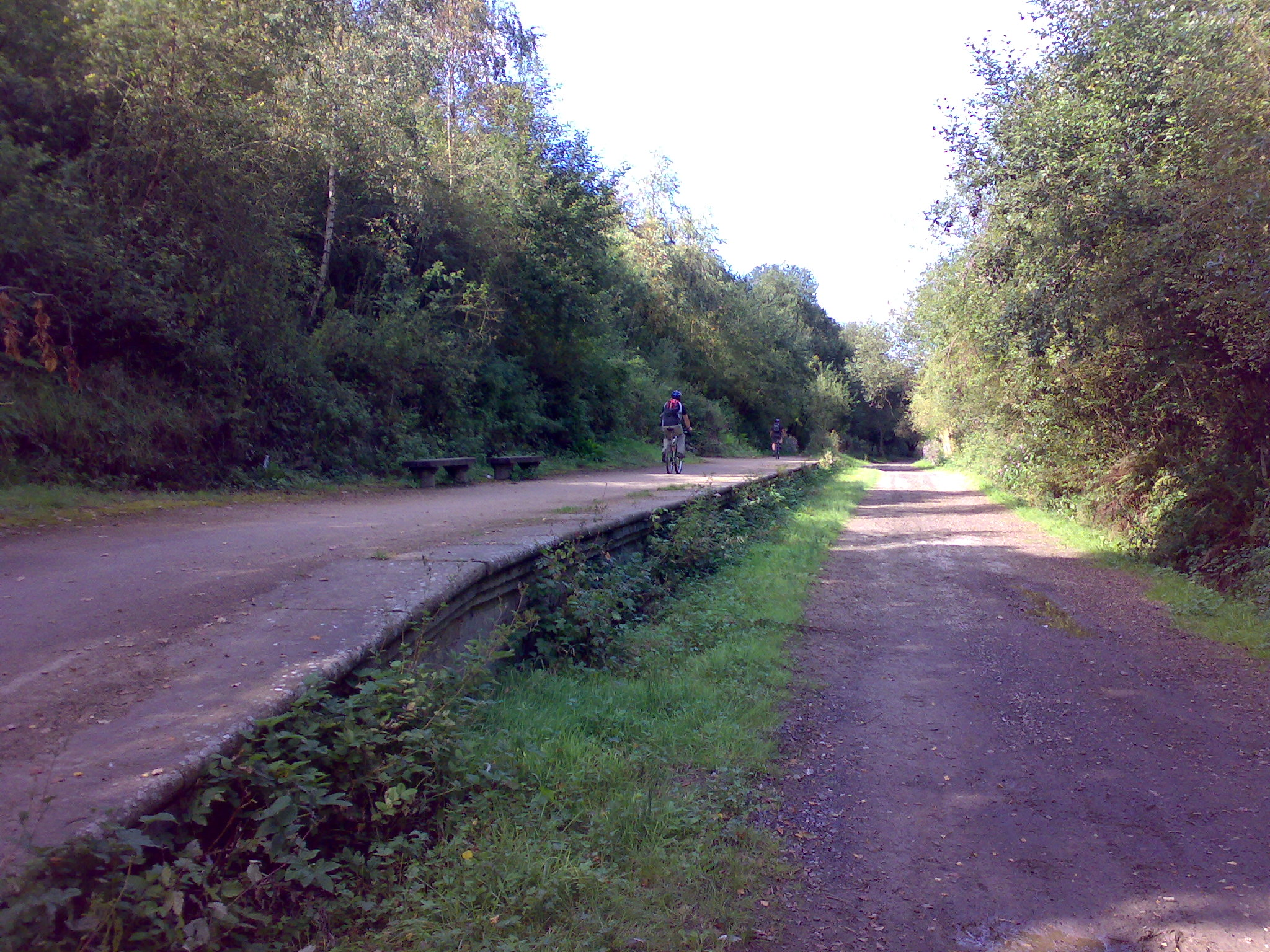
- The remaining west platform is in relatively good condition

General information
- Location: Outwood, Bury; England
- Coordinates: 53.54805°N 2.34078°W
- Grid reference: SD775057
- Platforms: 2

Other information
- Status: Disused

History
- Original company: East Lancashire Railway
- Pre-grouping: Lancashire and Yorkshire Railway
- Post-grouping: London, Midland and Scottish Railway

Key dates
- 31 May 1847: Station opened
- 5 January 1953: Station closed
Location

Ringley Road railway station was a stop on the Manchester, Bury and Rossendale Railway line; it was sited between Radcliffe Bridge and Clifton Junction, in Greater Manchester, England.

== History ==
The station was opened on 31 May 1847 in a remote location and was therefore little used. The western platform was accessed by a pathway down from Ringley Road; the eastern platform was accessed by a subway at the southern end of the station.

In 1879, it was the location of the apparent suicide of a collier who had been in the custody of a police officer for assaulting his wife. The collier had jumped in front of an approaching train and was crushed to death, almost dragging the officer along with him. A later inquest in Salford returned an open verdict.

It was closed on 5 January 1953.

Preceding station	Disused railways	Following station
Molyneux Brow	Lancashire and Yorkshire Railway; East Lancashire Railway	Radcliffe Bridge

== The site today ==
The Outwood Trail passes through the station on the old trackbed, forming part of the Irwell Sculpture Trail. One platform remains extant.
