= Manchester, Bury and Rossendale Railway =

Railway in England

- Industry: Railway company
- Founded: 1844
- Defunct: 24 July 1845
- Fate: Amalgamation
- Successor: East Lancashire Railway
- Headquarters: Greater Manchester and Lancashire

The Manchester, Bury and Rossendale Railway, opened in 1846, ran between Clifton, Bury and Rossendale in Lancashire, England. The company merged with the Blackburn, Burnley, Accrington and Colne Extension Railway (BBA&CER) to form the East Lancashire Railway.

== History ==
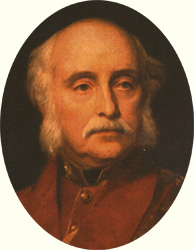
Sir Charles William Pasley (1780–1861), from 23 November 1841 the Inspector-General of railways

In the early 1840s the nearest railway to Bury was the Manchester and Bolton Railway, at its closest through Stoneclough almost 4.5 miles distant. This railway company had initially proposed to create a branch to Bury, but technical difficulties meant that the connection never materialised.

East Lancashire Railway Act 1844
- Act of Parliament
- Parliament of the United Kingdom
- Long title: An Act for making a Railway from the Manchester and Bolton Railway in the Parish of Eccles to the Parish of Whalley, all in the County Palatine of Lancaster, to be called The Manchester, Bury, and Rossendale Railway.
- Citation: 7 & 8 Vict. c. 60

Dates
- Royal assent: 4 July 1844

On 14 September 1843, a group of local businessmen including John Grundy, Thomas Wrigley and John Robinson Kay met at a hostelry in Bury to discuss the creation of a railway connection for the town. The Manchester, Bury and Rossendale Railway Company was formed, its purpose to build a railway from Bury to a junction with the Manchester and Bolton Railway at Clifton. The company also promoted the idea of extending the line northwards to Rawtenstall. In 1844, the company was incorporated by the East Lancashire Railway Act 1844 (7 & 8 Vict. c. lx), which authorized it to raise £300,000, and to borrow £100,000.

== Route ==
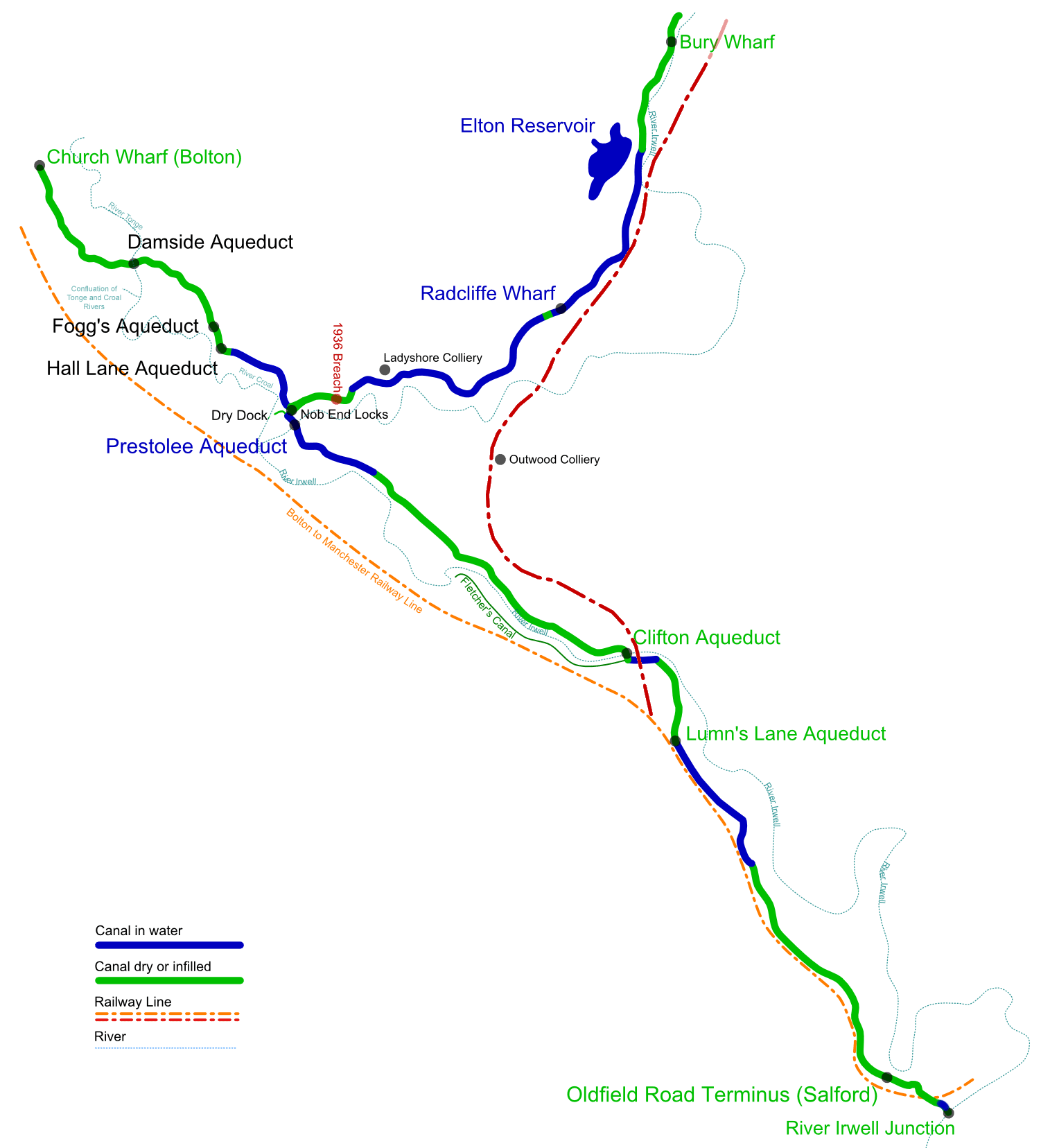
A map of the Manchester Bolton & Bury Canal showing the Manchester to Bolton line, and the later Manchester Bury and Rossendale line

Charles E. Cawley was appointed Chief Engineer, who instructed his recently appointed assistant Frederick Banister to set out the first few miles. The proposed route through the Irwell Valley was then approved by Chief Inspector of Railways Major General Sir Charles W. Pasley on 23 September 1846.

The railway began from a junction with the Manchester and Bolton Railway, in Clifton. It ran northeast through Molyneux Brow, Ringley Road, Radcliffe Bridge, Withins, and into Bury Bolton Street. Construction was completed quickly; William Harrison wrote "The railway was speedily completed and was opened for traffic on 28th September 1846", however men were asked to work on Sunday, and several were charged with breaking Sabbath.

=== Extension ===
Another company, the Blackburn, Burnley, Accrington and Colne Extension Railway, proposed to extend the line from Stubbins Junction to meet the Preston to Burnley route at Accrington, and obtained authorisation to do so in the East Lancashire Railway Act 1845 (8 & 9 Vict. c. xxxv). The two companies were joined on 24 July 1845 by the East Lancashire Railway Act 1845 No. 2 (8 & 9 Vict. c. ci) to form the East Lancashire Railway.

Banister was placed in charge with designing, surveying and gaining the necessary UK Parliament approval to extend the line, which hence became part of the Lancashire and Yorkshire Railway. Due to persistent health issues, after gaining parliamentary approval Banister left the project and construction was undertaken by engineers from the L&YR.

== Present day ==
The Manchester to Clifton section today forms part of the Manchester to Preston line. The line from Clifton towards Bury has been lifted, with Molyneux Brow totally removed due to construction of the M60 motorway. The section beyond Ringley Road to Withins Lane now forms the Irwell Sculpture Trail. Beyond this Manchester Metrolink uses the former railway infrastructure, with the line from Bury Bolton Street to Stubbins and Rawtenstall now being utilised by the preserved East Lancashire Railway. The line from Stubbins to Accrington has been lifted.
