= Radcliffe Bridge railway station =

Former railway station in Greater Manchester, England

Radcliffe Bridge
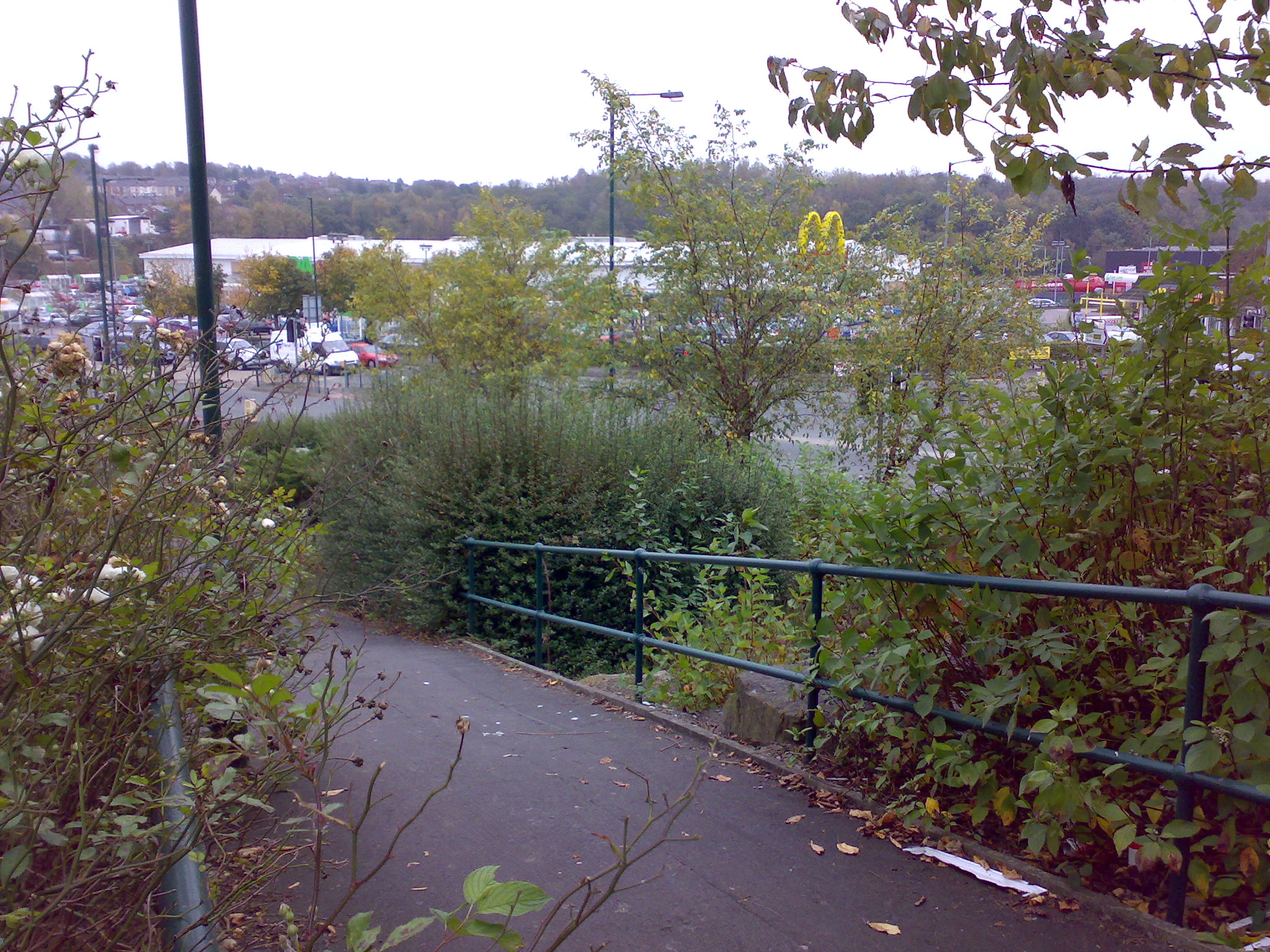
- The station occupied the general area viewed here. Pilkington Way (the road below) has obliterated any remaining trace

General information
- Location: Radcliffe, Bury; England
- Coordinates: 53.55907°N 2.32885°W
- Grid reference: SD782069
- Platforms: 2

History
- Original company: East Lancashire Railway
- Pre-grouping: Lancashire and Yorkshire Railway
- Post-grouping: London, Midland and Scottish Railway

Key dates
- 28 September 1846: Opened
- 7 July 1958: Closed
Location

Radcliffe Bridge railway station served Radcliffe, in Greater Manchester, England. It was built on the Manchester, Bury and Rossendale Railway line, between Bury Bolton Street and Clifton Junction. It was opened on 25 September 1846 and was closed on 7 July 1958.

== History ==
The Manchester, Bury and Rossendale Railway was formally opened from Clifton Junction to Rawtenstall on 25 September 1846, by which time it had amalgamated with other railways (also under construction) to form the East Lancashire Railway. Among the original stations was that at Radcliffe Bridge, 3 1/2 miles (5.6 km) from Clifton Junction; it opened on 28 September, when public train services began. The station was located between the Sion Street and Green Street bridges, immediately south-east of Grundy Street. There were two platforms and a siding on the west side of the tracks; the station building was on the east platform.

The station closed officially in 1959, although there had been no regular passenger service since 7 July 1958. Trains continued to pass through the station until 3 December 1966 when the railway was closed.

| Preceding station | Disused railways | Following station |
|---|---|---|
| Ringley Road | Lancashire and Yorkshire Railway; East Lancashire Railway | Withins Lane |

== The site today ==
No trace of the station now remains due to the construction of the A665 Pilkington Way, which cuts through the line of the railway. A railway bridge over the river Irwell is extant. The Outwood Trail passes near to the station site on the old trackbed, forming part of the Irwell Sculpture Trail.

== See also ==
- East Lancashire Railway 1844-1859
