= Molyneux Brow railway station =

Former railway station in England

Molyneux Brow

General information
- Location: Whitefield, Bury; England
- Coordinates: 53.5312°N 2.3176°W
- Grid reference: SD790038
- Platforms: 2

Other information
- Status: Disused

History
- Original company: East Lancashire Railway
- Pre-grouping: Lancashire and Yorkshire Railway
- Post-grouping: London, Midland and Scottish Railway

Key dates
- June 1853: Station opened
- 29 June 1931: Station closed
Location

Molyneux Brow railway station was a railway station built on the Manchester, Bury and Rossendale Railway line, between Radcliffe and Clifton (formerly Clifton Junction), in Greater Manchester.

== History ==
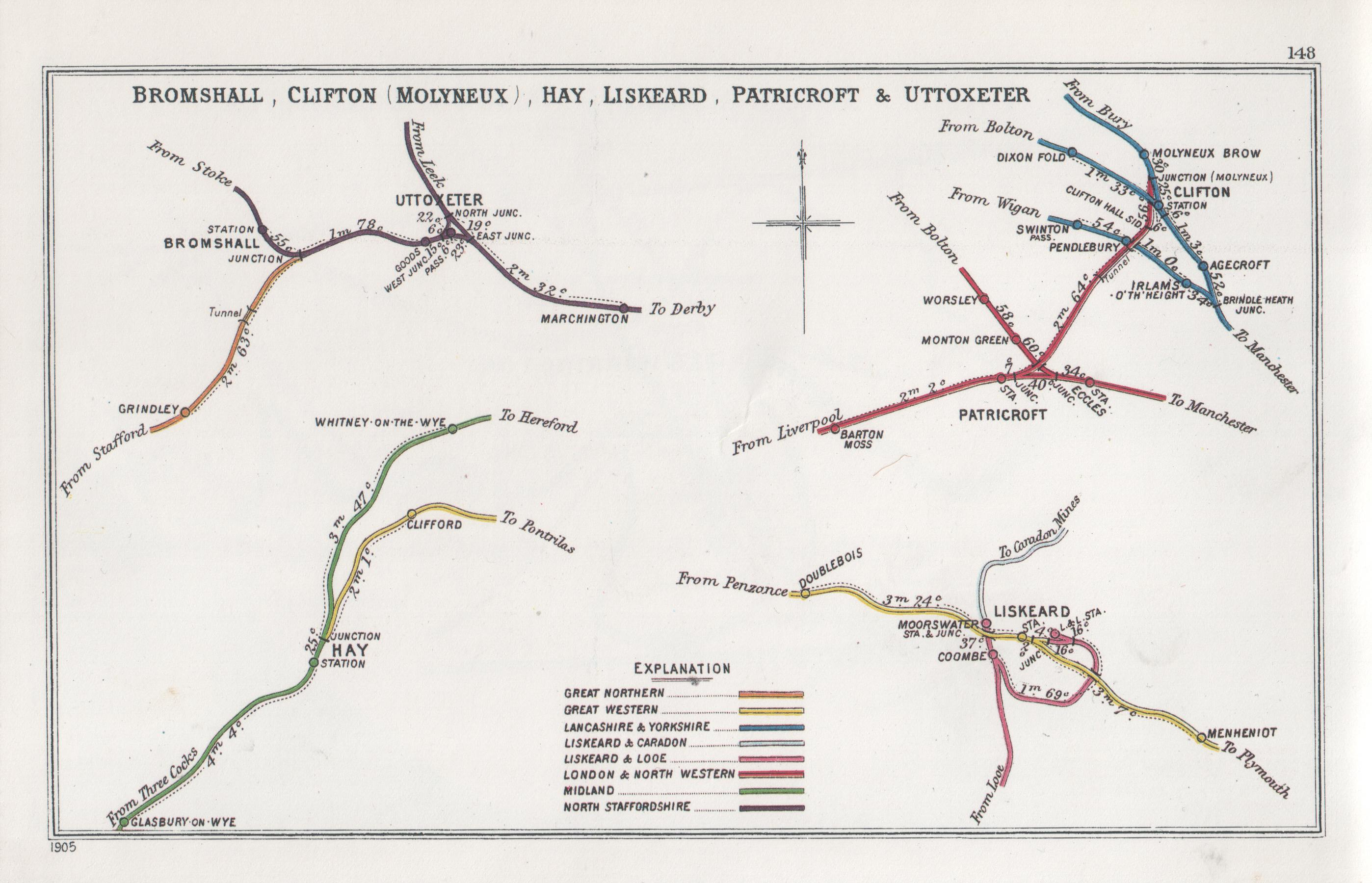
A 1905 Railway Clearing House Junction Diagram showing (upper right) railways in the vicinity of Molyneux Brow

The station was opened in June 1853, and was accessed from Philips Park Road. The station closed on 29 June 1931. The M60 motorway has removed any trace of this station.

== See also ==
- East Lancashire Railway 1844-1859

Preceding station	Disused railways	Following station
Clifton Junction	Lancashire and Yorkshire Railway; East Lancashire Railway	Ringley Road
