= Withins Lane railway station =

Former railway station in England

Withins Lane

General information
- Location: Radcliffe, Bury; England
- Coordinates: 53.56955°N 2.31821°W
- Grid reference: SD791082

Other information
- Status: Disused

History
- Original company: East Lancashire Railway

Key dates
- August 1847: Station opened
- May 1849: Closed
- February 1850: Re-opened
- December 1851: Closed
Location

Withins Lane railway station was a railway station serving the town of Radcliffe in Lancashire (now Greater Manchester), England.

== History ==
The railway line between Clifton and Rawtenstall was planned by the Manchester, Bury and Rossendale Railway, which amalgamated with other companies as the East Lancashire Railway prior to the opening in September 1846. Originally there were no stations between Radcliffe Bridge and Bury; a station at Withins Lane was later built, but was only open for two brief periods: August 1847–May 1849 and February 1850–December 1851, during which it served the northern part of Radcliffe, and was a stopping point for trains operated via Clifton Junction. Since 1879 the area has been served by the station now known as Radcliffe Metrolink station.

Preceding station	Disused railways	Following station
Radcliffe Bridge; Line and station closed	East Lancashire Railway	Bury Bolton Street; Line closed, station open
