= Westhead Halt railway station =

Former railway station in England

Westhead Halt
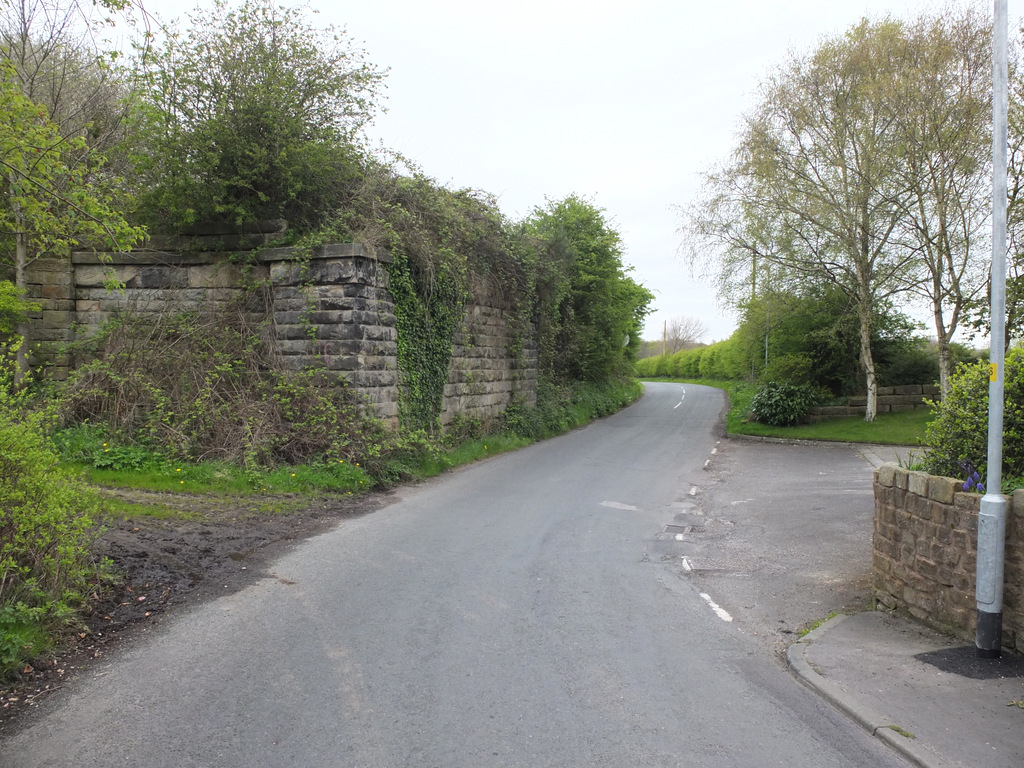
- Remains of the railway bridge at Westhead Halt (2017)

General information
- Location: Westhead; England
- Coordinates: 53.565569°N 2.848793°W
- Grid reference: SD438080
- Platforms: Two

Other information
- Status: Disused

History
- Original company: Lancashire and Yorkshire Railway
- Pre-grouping: Lancashire and Yorkshire Railway
- Post-grouping: London, Midland and Scottish Railway

Key dates
- 1 July 1906: Opened
- 18 June 1951: Closed to passengers
Location

Westhead Halt railway station was on the Skelmersdale branch, which ran from Ormskirk to Rainford Junction via Skelmersdale. Most trains ran beyond Rainford Junction through to St Helens.

The station was situated on Castle Lane, Westhead, near Ormskirk. It opened on 1 July 1906 and closed on 18 June 1951. The line through the station was lifted in the 1960s and the station has been demolished, though the trackbed can easily be found.

== Services ==
In July 1922 16 "Up" (southbound) trains called at the station on weekdays, with an extra on Saturday evenings. All originated at Ormskirk, several with connections from Southport. Ten Up trains called on Sundays. All trains continued to Rainford Junction where a few terminated, the majority continuing all stations to St Helens. The "Down" (northbound) service was similar.

The trains all consisted of "Motor Cars – One class only". 'Motor Cars' did not have its modern meaning, but consisted of a single railway coach joined to a dedicated steam locomotive. Their generic type is summarised in L&YR railmotors. Photographs appear in Bob Pixton's work on the line.

In 1951 the Up service consisted of nine trains on weekdays with four extra on Saturdays, one of which terminated at Skelmersdale. The rolling stock was "Third Class Only". Of the nine trains five continued past Rainford Junction, all stations to St Helens. Eight trains called on Sundays, plying between Ormskirk and Rainford Junction only. The Down service was similar. As was often the case with such local services, these trains acquired a nickname – "The Skem Dodger".

All local trains plying between Ormskirk and St Helens called at Rainford Junction, entailing a reverse. None used the 'direct line' between Bushey Lane Junction and Randle Junction which formed the third side of the triangle shown on the route diagram. That stretch was the preserve of goods trains, diversions and occasional specials.

Preceding station	Disused railways	Following station
Skelmersdale; Line and station closed	Lancashire and Yorkshire Railway; Skelmersdale Branch	Ormskirk; Line closed, station open
