= Hoghton railway station =

Former railway station in England

Hoghton
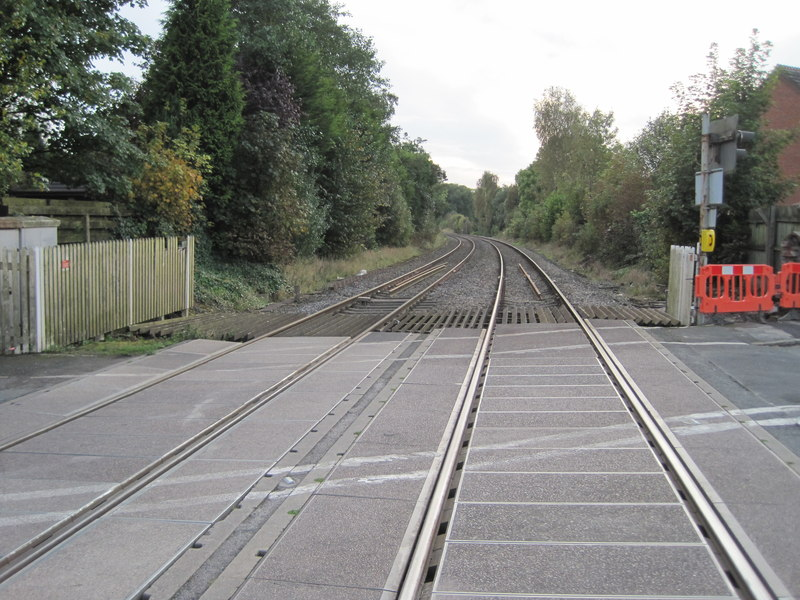
- Site of the former station (2012)

General information
- Location: Hoghton, Chorley; England
- Coordinates: 53.7364°N 2.5945°W
- Grid reference: SD608268
- Platforms: 2

Other information
- Status: Disused

History
- Original company: Blackburn and Preston Railway
- Pre-grouping: Lancashire and Yorkshire Railway
- Post-grouping: London, Midland and Scottish Railway

Key dates
- 1 June 1846: Station opened
- 12 September 1960: Station closed
Location

Hoghton railway station was a railway station in Lancashire that served the village of Hoghton. It was situated on the East Lancashire Line between Preston and Blackburn. It was closed in 1960.

The Blackburn and Preston Railway (B&PR) was authorised on 6 June 1844. It opened to passengers on 1 June 1846, with Hoghton being among the original stations. Goods traffic commenced on 1 June 1847, by which time the B&PR had amalgamated with the East Lancashire Railway. The station closed on 12 September 1960.

Preceding station	Historical railways	Following station
Bamber Bridge; Line and station open	Lancashire and Yorkshire Railway; Blackburn and Preston Railway	Pleasington; Line and station open
