= Westhead (surname) =

Westhead is a toponymic surname derived from the village of Westhead in Lancashire, England.

Notable people with this surname include:

- Andy Westhead, member of British pop punk band As It Is
- Barry Westhead (born 1977), English musician and member of the band Starsailor
- Cam Westhead (born 1977), Canadian politician
- David Westhead (born 1963), English actor
- John Westhead (1966–2000), English rugby player
- Joshua Westhead (1807–1877), British politician
- Mark Westhead (born 1975), English footballer
- Paul Westhead (born 1939), American basketball coach
