= Thomas Wrigley =

British merchant in the 19th century

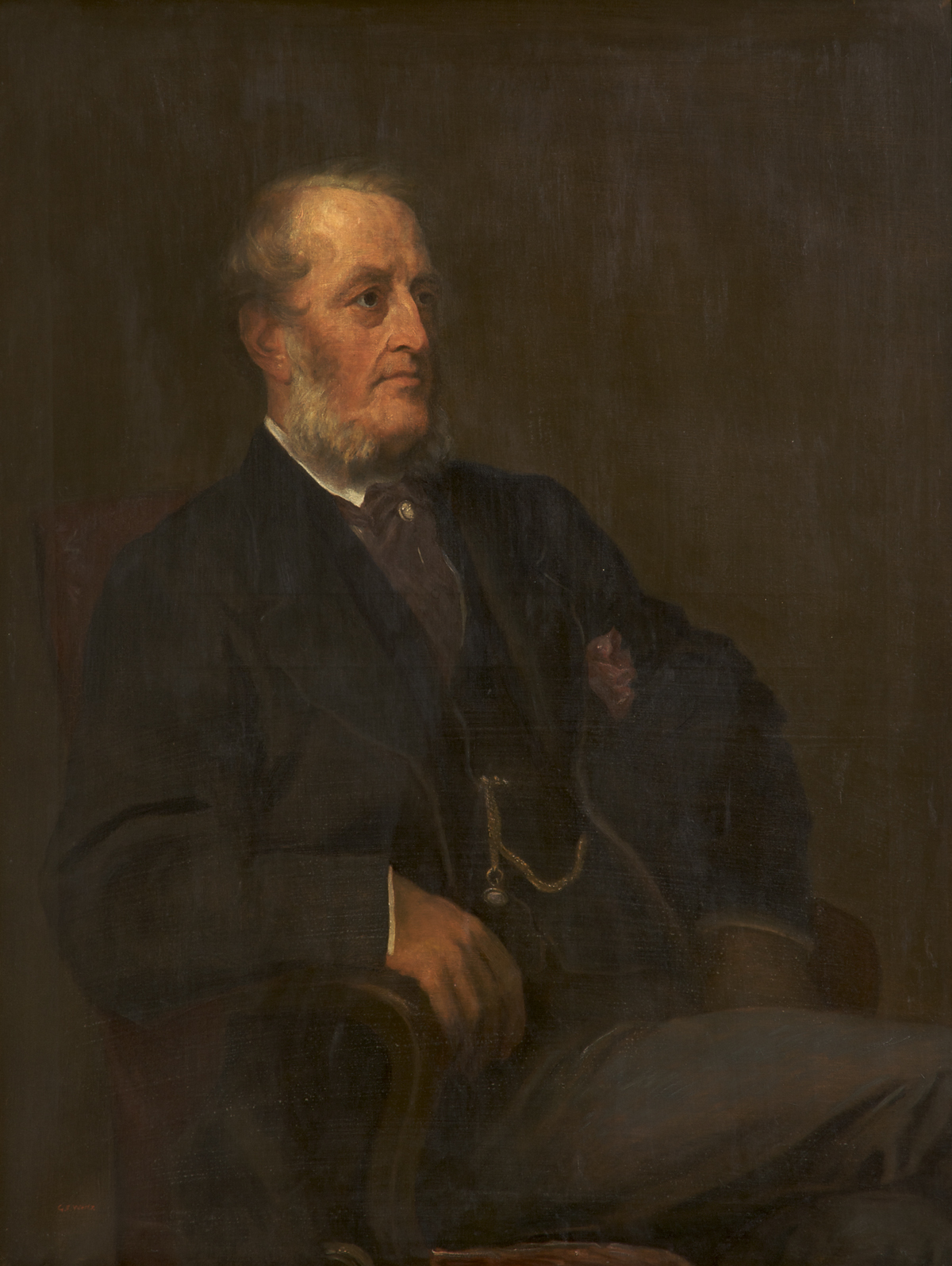
Thomas Wrigley, oil on canvas portrait by George Frederic Watts

Thomas Wrigley (27 June 1808 – 26 January 1880) was a British paper manufacturer, cotton mill owner, art collector and philanthropist from Bury, Lancashire. He was High Sheriff of Lancashire in 1872.

== Life ==
Born on 27 June 1808 close to the Bridge Hall Paper Mills, he was the son of the Bury businessman James Wrigley (1781–1846). His father leased the Mills in 1810, on the death of the previous tenant Thomas Crompton. He ran the business with his brother Francis (1785–1837).

Thomas Wrigley inherited the business in 1846, on his father's death. According to Edward Morris, he was "largely responsible for making Bury one of the greatest paper-making centres in the world".

Wrigley was a Liberal in his political views and favoured both compulsory education and free trade. He was a supporter of Manchester Grammar School and Owens College, Manchester.

Wrigley, who was a Unitarian, served as High Sheriff of Lancashire in 1872.

At his death in 1880, Wrigley left his paper mills, cotton mill and over £1.1 million to be shared between his three sons, while his small estate in Bury, along with the house there and a holiday house at Windermere, were left to his daughter. In 1897, his family donated his collection of paintings, porcelain and other artworks to form a purpose-built art gallery for the people of Bury.
