= Skelmersdale branch =

Former railway branch line in Lancashire, England

The Skelmersdale branch was a railway line that connected the Liverpool, Ormskirk and Preston Railway at Ormskirk with Rainford Junction, via Skelmersdale, in Lancashire, England.

== History ==
Opened on 1 March 1858, the line was built by the East Lancashire Railway, which was taken over by the Lancashire and Yorkshire Railway shortly afterwards.

The branch line connected with the Liverpool and Bury Railway and the St. Helens Railway at Rainford.

Passenger services ended on 5 November 1956. Goods trains contuned to operate to Rainford until 16 November 1961 and to Skelmersdale on 4 November 1963. Since then, Skelmersdale has had no rail connection but has grown in size and population considerably.

== Reopening proposals ==
Over the years, several proposals have been put forward to reopen the branch and build a new railway station at Skelmersdale. It had been listed as a priority one candidate for reopening by the Campaign for Better Transport.

=== Via Ormskirk ===
Proposals have been put forward for the reopening of a section of line, reconnecting trains for Skelmersdale into Merseyrail's Northern Line Ormskirk branch.

In June 2009, the Association of Train Operating Companies, in its Expanding Access to the Rail Network report, called for funding for the reopening of this station as part of a £500m scheme to open 33 stations on 14 lines closed in the Beeching Axe, including seven new parkway stations. The report proposes extending the line from Ormskirk railway station by laying three miles of new single track along the previous route towards Rainford Junction, at a cost estimated to be in the region of £31 million. The route is largely intact; however, deviation north of Westhead would be required. The proposed Skelmersdale station would be on the north-west corner of the town, near to the Skelmersdale Ring Road, next to where the former station site.

In December 2012, Merseytravel commissioned Network Rail to study route options and costs of connecting to Skelmersdale with Merseytravel contributing £50,000 and West Lancashire Council contributing £100,000. The range of options considered including a simple park and ride on the existing Northern Line Kirkby branch, an extension of this branch to a new terminus in Skelmersdale and a connection from the Northern Line Ormskirk branch, possibly extended to create a loop via Skelmersdale between Kirkby and Ormskirk. Merseytravel were represented on a board led by Lancashire County Council, which developed a flowchart detailing how the scheme may be delivered.

In 2014, the reopening of a section of the Skelmersdale branch from Upholland to[Skelmersdale town centre was proposed. The line was completely closed in 1963. This would give Skelmersdale, the second largest town in North West England without a railway service after Leigh, direct access to Liverpool city centre. Network Rail recommended a further feasibility study be carried out.

=== Via Kirkby/Headbolt Lane ===
In February 2017, Lancashire County Council confirmed that the preferred site for Skelmersdale railway station was the former site of Glenburn Sports College/Westbank Campus. County Council Transport portfolio holder John Fillis said that the site "is big enough to provide a high quality station with scope to expand to meet future demand.". By September, Merseytravel announced that they would be committing £765,000 to the study into the re-opening, estimating that the station could be open within a decade with a lot of additional funding. Merseytravel's plan would also see a new station built at Headbolt Lane in Kirkby. It has been proposed a new station at Skelmersdale would act as the terminus for Merseyrail's Northern Line, with connections available to Wigan and Manchester. Initial estimates suggest that the scheme could cost around £300 million to develop.

The Liverpool City Region Combined Authority's Long Term Rail Strategy document of October 2017 states that Merseytravel was currently working with Lancashire County Council and Network Rail to develop a plan to extend the Merseyrail network from Kirkby through to Skelmersdale, with work being completed in 2019. They are considering third rail electrification and other alternatives with a new station at Headbolt Lane to serve the Northwood area of Kirkby. Two trials of electric third rail/battery trains would be undertaken in 2020 as one of the "alternatives".

The government in April 2020 gave assurances that the Skelemersdale link would be constructed. Lancashire County Council submitted their Strategic Outline Business Case to the DfT in September 2021, which proposed two options. The favoured option was a heavy rail link into the town centre. The submission mentions the use of battery Class 777 electric multiple units.

=== Recent Objections ===
In July 2022, the Department for Transport (DfT) rejected Lancashire County Council's Strategic Outline Business Case. The DfT instead suggested that better bus links with the Kirkby–Wigan railway line would be a cheaper way of improving connectivity for Skelmersdale.
