= Glenburn Sports College =

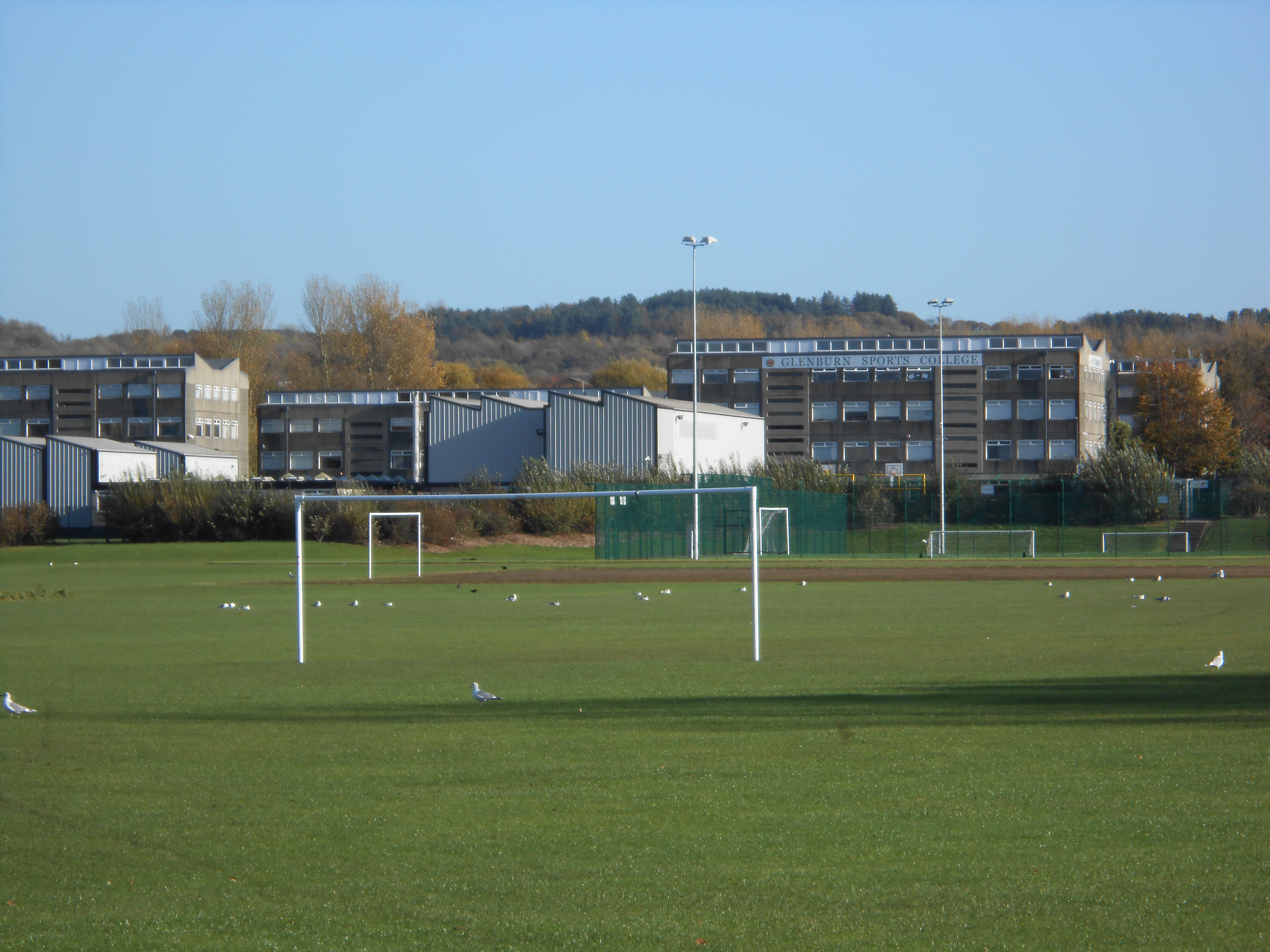

Location
- Yewdale, Southway; Skelmersdale, Lancashire, WN8 6JB; England; 53.5478°N 2.7771°W

Information
- Type: Foundation school
- Established: 1967
- Closed: 31 August 2016
- Local authority: Lancashire County Council
- Trust: Glenburn Education Trust
- Department for Education URN: 119758 Tables
- Ofsted: Reports
- Head teacher: Karen Ingham
- Gender: Mixed
- Age range: 11–16
- Enrolment: 320 (2015)
- Capacity: 1,033
- Website: www.glenburn.lancs.sch.uk

Glenburn Sports College was an 11–16 mixed, foundation secondary school in Skelmersdale, Lancashire, England. It was established in 1967 and was part of the Glenburn Education Trust. It closed in 2016 due to consistently poor results and low pupil numbers, and was noted for having the worst GCSE results in Lancashire.

== History ==
Glenburn Sports College was established in 1967 as Glenburn County Secondary School, officially opening in September 1967 as Lancashire's first purpose-built comprehensive school. Upon opening, the £500,000 school had a capacity of 1,050 students, who were taught by around 30 teachers. The school replaced the former Skelmersdale County Secondary School, with around 400 students transferring from that to the new Glenburn school. Prior to its official opening, part of the school had begun operating from spring 1967 with a small cohort of 100 students from Skelmersdale County Secondary School. The former secondary school transitioned to offer primary provision and became Brookfields County Primary School, retaining its larger classrooms and gymnasium facility.

The first headteacher of the school, Mr Denis Wilson, also transferred from Skelmersdale County Secondary School, where he had been the headteacher since that school's inception in 1958. Wilson had started his teaching career in Liverpool and had taught in primary, secondary modern and grammar schools from 1935 to 1951.

=== Closure ===
Lancashire County Council began a public consultation on the future of the school in October 2014 after figures showed the number of students had reduced by 54% since 2006, and ran until 14 December 2014. Students, parents, staff, councillors and local residents totalling approximately 400, and West Lancashire MP Rosie Cooper, marched in protest on 15 November 2014 over its potential closure. Parents had already submitted their views to the council and booked appointments with its officers as well as signing petitions, in preparation for the consultation event on 20 November 2014.

Following the initial six-week consultation, the council moved to stage two of the consultation in February 2015 despite opposition from the local community, which is the publication of a 'statutory notice'. Rosie Cooper said, "Whilst this decision is unwelcome news, I will continue to stand shoulder to shoulder with parents and pupils" and had questioned the Minister of State for Schools over the possible conflict of interest of the council's Director of Education, who was also the chair of the Glenburn Educational Trust. Stage three involved a further four-week statutory consultation period following the publication of the formal proposals, which allowed interested parties to submit their comments, objections as well as those in support, before a final decision is made.

On 19 May 2015, the council agreed to close the school on 31 August 2016 due to consistently poor results, despite the range of additional support that was provided by the council, and low pupil numbers, which "made it difficult for it to provide a broad and balanced education" and impacted the school's finances and standards. At the time, it had 320 students compared to the school's capacity of more than 1,000 and was noted for having the worst GCSE results in Lancashire. The decision was widely criticised including Rosie Cooper who had been campaigning with students, parents, staff and the local community to keep the school open, stating the concerns over "the lack of clarity and commitment and support for existing pupils, especially those taking their GCSEs" and referred to the closure as being the "cheap and easy option". Cooper also said "This entire process from start to finish has been a huge mess. It has been flawed and I fear the impact this will have on pupils and their families" and "Despite 95% being opposed to the closure they are still pushing ahead with it".

County councillor Matthew Tomlinson said Ofsted inspectors had been concerned for many years and if the council had not closed the school, the Department for Education "would probably make us do so". Year 7 and 9 students moved to a different school in September 2015 while Year 8 and 10 completed their Key Stage 3 and GCSE studies.

==== Unsuccessful appeal ====
Parents, students and staff subsequently launched an appeal to the Office of the Schools Adjudicator, noting the unhappiness over the consultation process and the impact it will have on the local community, including the lack of parental choice, the future need for school places, transport issues and the loss of facilities. It was the last chance for over-turning the closure decision but was unsuccessful after being confirmed it would go ahead in August 2015. The following month, two councillors had written to the Secretary of State for Education Nicky Morgan to reject the closure.

==== Vandalism and fires ====
Following the closure, the building was subject to heavy vandalism and concerns were raised by Skelmersdale North Councillor Neil Furey after visiting the site in October 2016, describing it as "a disgrace and resembles a war zone", and "calling for the site to be made more secure and that an urgent resolution is sought to deal with this matter". It was also subject to multiple fires; September 2016, November 2016, November 2018 and seven fires over four days in April 2019.

=== Proposed railway station ===
As part of a plan to provide a railway station for Skelmersdale, Lancashire County Council announced in 2017 that they had identified the site of the former college as the preferred location for a new station. The plan, in partnership with Merseytravel and West Lancashire Borough Council, was devised from studies by Network Rail and recommended the site as the best location. The council began negotiations to buy the site from the current owners, Newcastle College.
