= Westhead =

Coordinates: 53.563°N 2.844°W

- Village
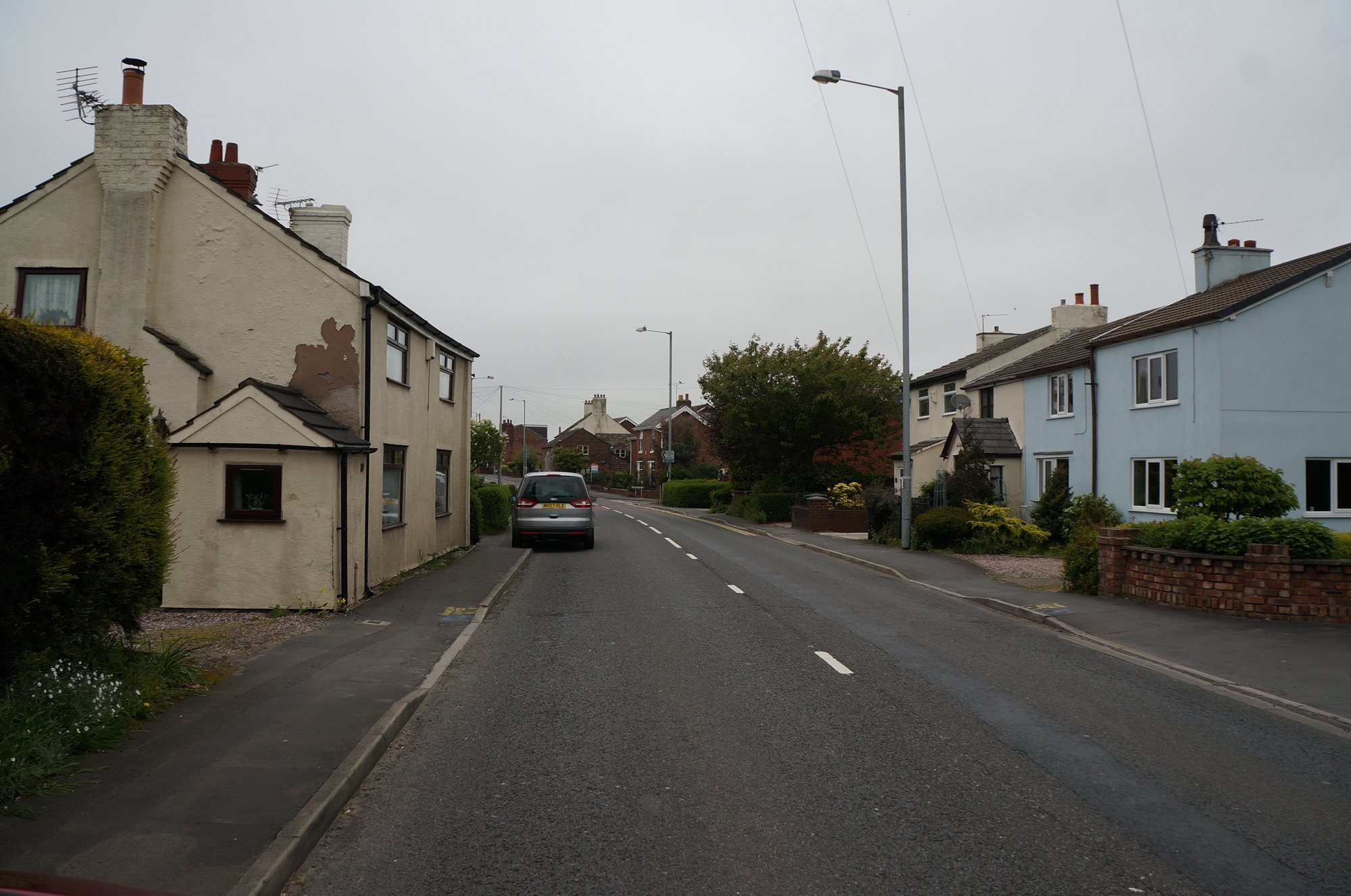
- Wigan Road, Westhead

- Shown within West Lancashire Location within Lancashire
- Area: 0.203 km^{2} (0.078 sq mi)
- Population: 886 (2014 estimate)
  - Density: 4,365/km^{2} (11,310/sq mi)
- OS grid reference: SD441077
  - London: 182 mi (293 km) SE
- District: West Lancashire
- Shire county: Lancashire
- Region: North West
- Country: England
- Sovereign state: United Kingdom
- Post town: Ormskirk
- Postcode district: L40
- Dialling code: 01695
- Police: Lancashire
- Fire: Lancashire
- Ambulance: North West
- UK Parliament: West Lancashire

Westhead is a village in the West Lancashire district of Lancashire, England. As of 2014, the estimated population was 886.

== History ==
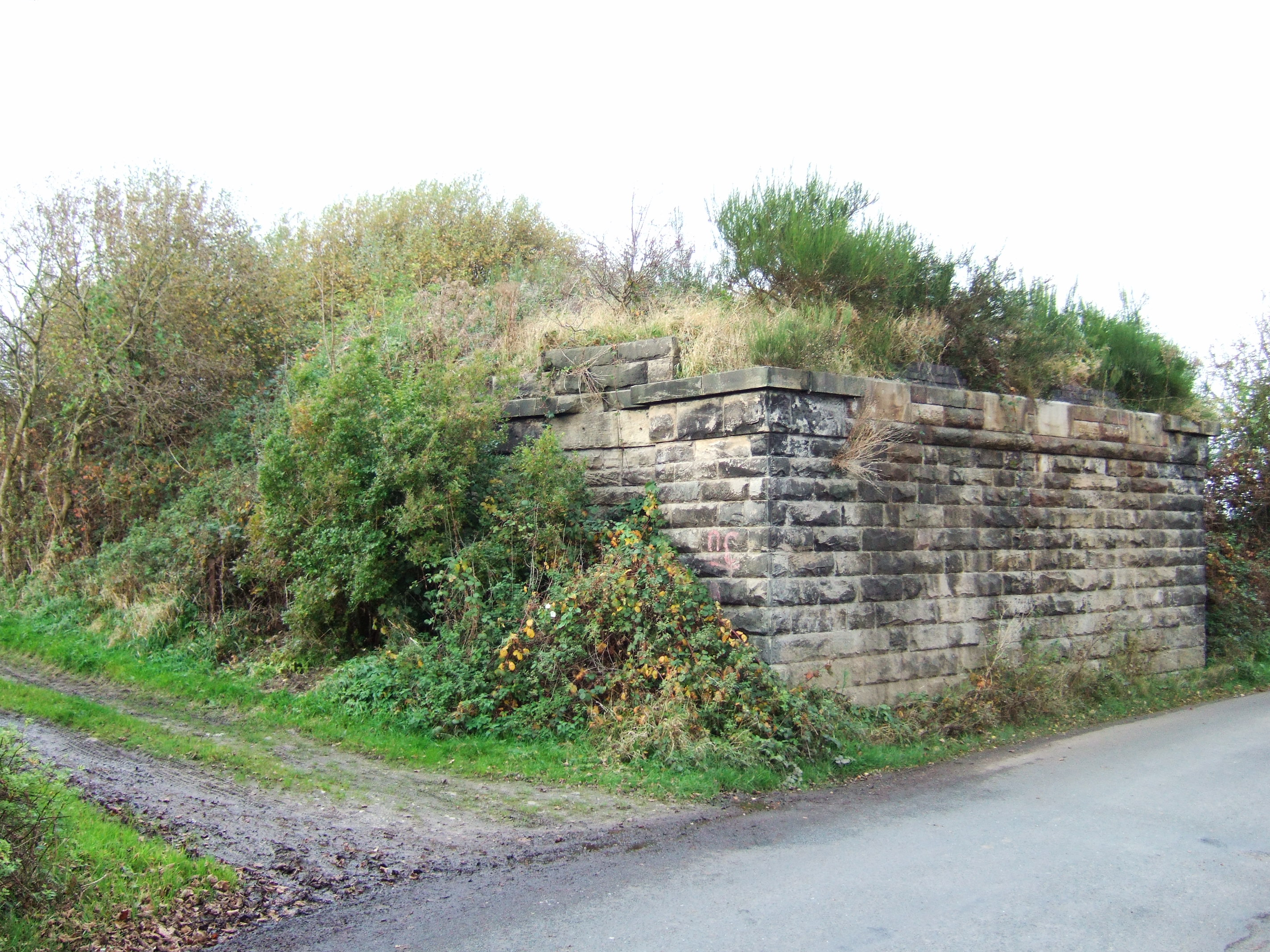
The former site of Westhead Halt railway station

Westhead was, for most of its existence, a hamlet in the township of Lathom. It was located in the West Derby Hundred. In 1066, the Lord of the area was Uhtred.

In 1851, Westhead Church was built with land donated from Edward Wilbraham-Bootle, 1st Baron Skelmersdale, the cost of which was paid for by the Earl of Derby and the sandstone was donated by Edward Stanley of Cross Hall, who owned the Ruff Wood quarry in Lathom at the time.

Westhead Halt was a request stop on the Skelmersdale to Rainford line, and evidence of the former line can be seen around the town.

=== Toponymy ===
Westhead means "western hill" and comes from the Old English west + hēafod. The name was recorded as Westheft c. 1190 and Westheved c. 1200, and refers to the western headland at the end of the ridge that leads towards Scarth Hill.

== Geography ==
Westhead is located in rural West Lancashire and is part of the unparished area of Ormskirk. It lies about 1.2 miles (1.9 km) east of Ormksirk town centre and is bordered to the north, east and south by the civil parishes of Burscough, Lathom, Lathom South and Bickerstaffe.

Westhead is about 15 miles (24 km) southwest of Preston, the administrative centre of Lancashire, and 182 miles (293 km) northwest of London.

== Culture and community ==
Westhead Carnival is a popular summertime fête which has been held annually since 1973. The event is typically held over three days at the start of July and hosts a variety of activities, including a carnival parade, funfair rides, car boot sale, bingo and fancy dress ball. In 2014, the carnival was attended by around 3,000 people and raised over £2,000 for local community projects.

== Transport ==
The A577 road runs east through Westhead for a distance of approximately 1 mile (1.6 km), connecting the nearby towns of Ormskirk and Skelmersdale. There are several bus services operated by Arriva North West that pass along this route: the 310 is a half-hourly service between Skelmersdale and Liverpool, while the 375 and 385 are hourly services (alternating every half hour) from Southport to Wigan. The nearest motorway link is junction 3 of the M58, about 1.7 miles (2.7 km) to the south at Bickerstaffe.

Westhead Halt, situated on Castle Lane, was a former railway station on the Skelmersdale Branch which connected Ormskirk with Rainford. However, the station closed in 1951 and has since been demolished, the line having closed to all traffic in 1963. The nearest railway station today is Ormskirk, about 1.2 miles (1.9 km) east, which provides passenger services to Liverpool and Preston.

== Education ==
Westhead Lathom St James is a Church of England primary school associated with the nearby parish church of St James. The school is located on School Lane near the village centre and provides mixed gender education for children aged four to eleven. An Ofsted report published in January 2015 gave Westhead Lathom St James an "Outstanding" rating in all categories, and in December 2015 it was ranked amongst the top 1000 primary schools in England in the National Curriculum assessment performance tables. As of September 2019, the headteacher was Miss Helen Clark.

The school building with attached master's house dates from 1889 and is a Grade II listed building. It is made of sandstone with crazy paving walling and a slate roof, and is built in the Gothic style. The school has a single storey with a T-shaped plan, formed by a main range and cross wing to the left, while the house has two storeys and is attached to the right.

== Religious sites ==
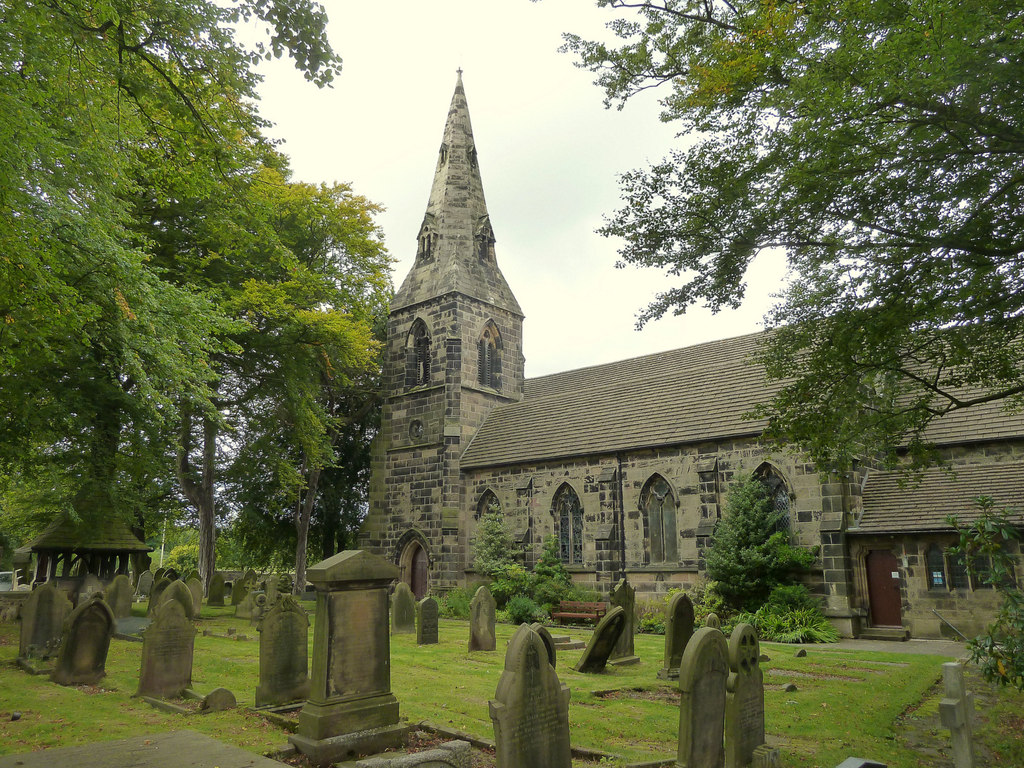
St James Church, Westhead

St James Church is a Grade II listed building situated on Vicarage Lane, about 0.5 miles (0.8 km) southwest of the village. The ecclesiastical parish of St James Westhead is in the Anglican Diocese of Liverpool, the archdeaconry of Ormskirk, and forms part of a benefice with the nearby parish of Christ Church, Newburgh. In the churchyard are two Commonwealth War Graves, one belonging to a soldier of World War I and the other an airman of World War II.

== See also ==
- Listed buildings in Ormskirk
