= Rainford railway station =

Railway station in Merseyside, England

Rainford
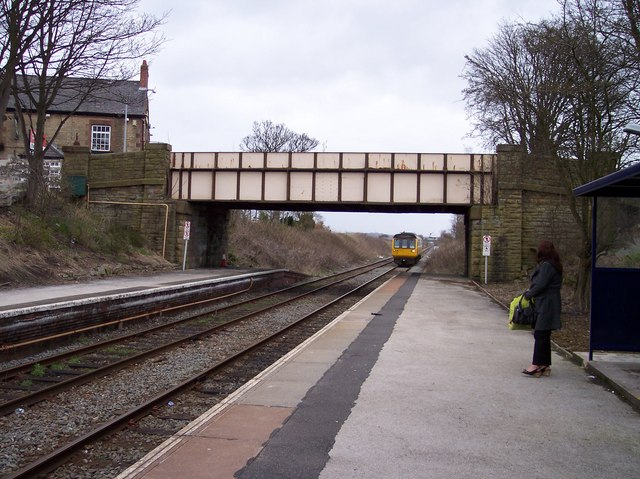
- The station in 2008 with a British Rail Class 142 Pacer arriving

General information
- Location: Rainford, Metropolitan Borough of St Helens, England
- Coordinates: 53.517°N 2.789°W
- Grid reference: SD478025
- Manager: Northern Trains
- Transit authority: Merseytravel
- Platforms: 2

Other information
- Station code: RNF
- Fare zone: A2
- Classification: DfT category F2

Passengers
- 2021/22: ▲22,122
- 2022/23: ▼20,794
- 2023/24: ▲21,072
- 2024/25: ▲26,220
- 2025/26: ▲33,224
Location
Notes
- Passenger statistics from the Office of Rail and Road

Rainford railway station is situated to the north of the village of Rainford, in Merseyside, England; it is a stop on the Kirkby branch line. The station and all trains serving it are operated by Northern Trains.

== History ==
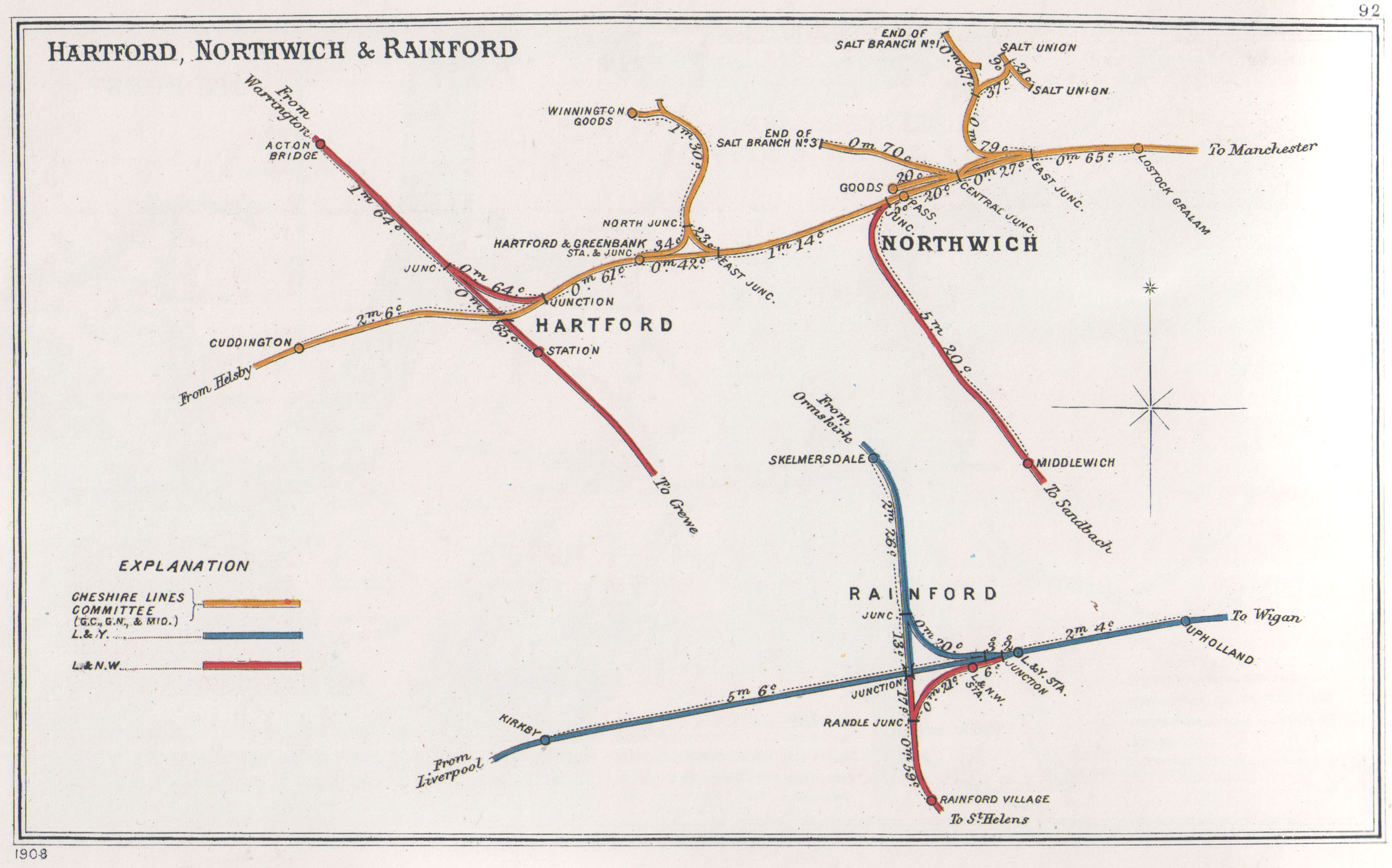
A 1908 Railway Clearing House Junction Diagram showing (lower right) railways in the vicinity of Rainford

It was built in 1858 as Rainford Junction at the junction of the Liverpool and Bury Railway (L&BR), the East Lancashire Railway's Skelmersdale Branch and the St. Helens Railway, replacing an earlier station (1848) called Rainford. The main line and the Skelmersdale Branch were taken over by the Lancashire and Yorkshire Railway (L&YR) in 1859, whilst the St Helens line became part of the London and North Western Railway in 1864. The former L&BR route was subsequently upgraded by the L&YR to become its main line between Liverpool and Manchester, carrying expresses to Manchester Victoria, Bradford Exchange and Leeds Central, as well as local trains to Wigan Wallgate and Bolton until after the nationalisation of the railways in 1948 and well beyond.

Services on the line to St Helens were withdrawn by the British Transport Commission on 18 June 1951 and to Ormskirk on 5 November 1956, although goods traffic survived on both until the early 1960s.

Through trains from Liverpool Exchange to Bolton via Wigan continued until 1977, though the line from here westwards to Fazakerley had been reduced to single track operation in May 1970. After the closure of Exchange in May 1977, the line was severed at Kirkby with through passengers having to change between diesel and electric services there to continue their journeys. The station's signal box was retained to supervise the 5 1/4 miles (8.4 km) single line section (since shortened to 4 1/2 miles (7.2 km), since the opening of the new Headbolt Lane station to what was now the terminus of the branch; this remains in operation today and is now the only one left on the line.

The station was renamed Rainford on 7 May 1973.

== Facilities ==
Though the station had sizeable buildings on both platforms at one time, the last of these (on the Wigan-bound platform) was demolished in the late 1990s. The disused branch platform faces are still visible, but heavily overgrown.

There are now just basic shelters in place on each side, along with a footbridge to connect them. The station is unstaffed, but has a card-only ticket machine. Train running information can be obtained by dot matrix displays, telephone or from timetable poster boards on each platform. Step-free access is available on both platforms via ramps from the nearby road.

== Services ==
All services at Rainford are operated by Northern Trains; it is served by one train per hour in each direction between Headbolt Lane and Blackburn, via Wigan Wallgate and Manchester Victoria. Connections for Merseyrail services to and from Liverpool Central can be made by changing at Headbolt Lane. No services call at the station during late evenings or on Sundays.

Preceding station	National Rail	Following station
Headbolt Lane	Northern Trains Kirkby Branch Line Monday-Saturday only	Upholland
	Disused railways	
Hey's Crossing Halt	Lancashire and Yorkshire Railway Skelmersdale Branch	Terminus
Rainford Village	London and North Western Railway St Helens Railway	Terminus
