= Clifton railway station (Greater Manchester) =

Railway station in Greater Manchester, England

Clifton
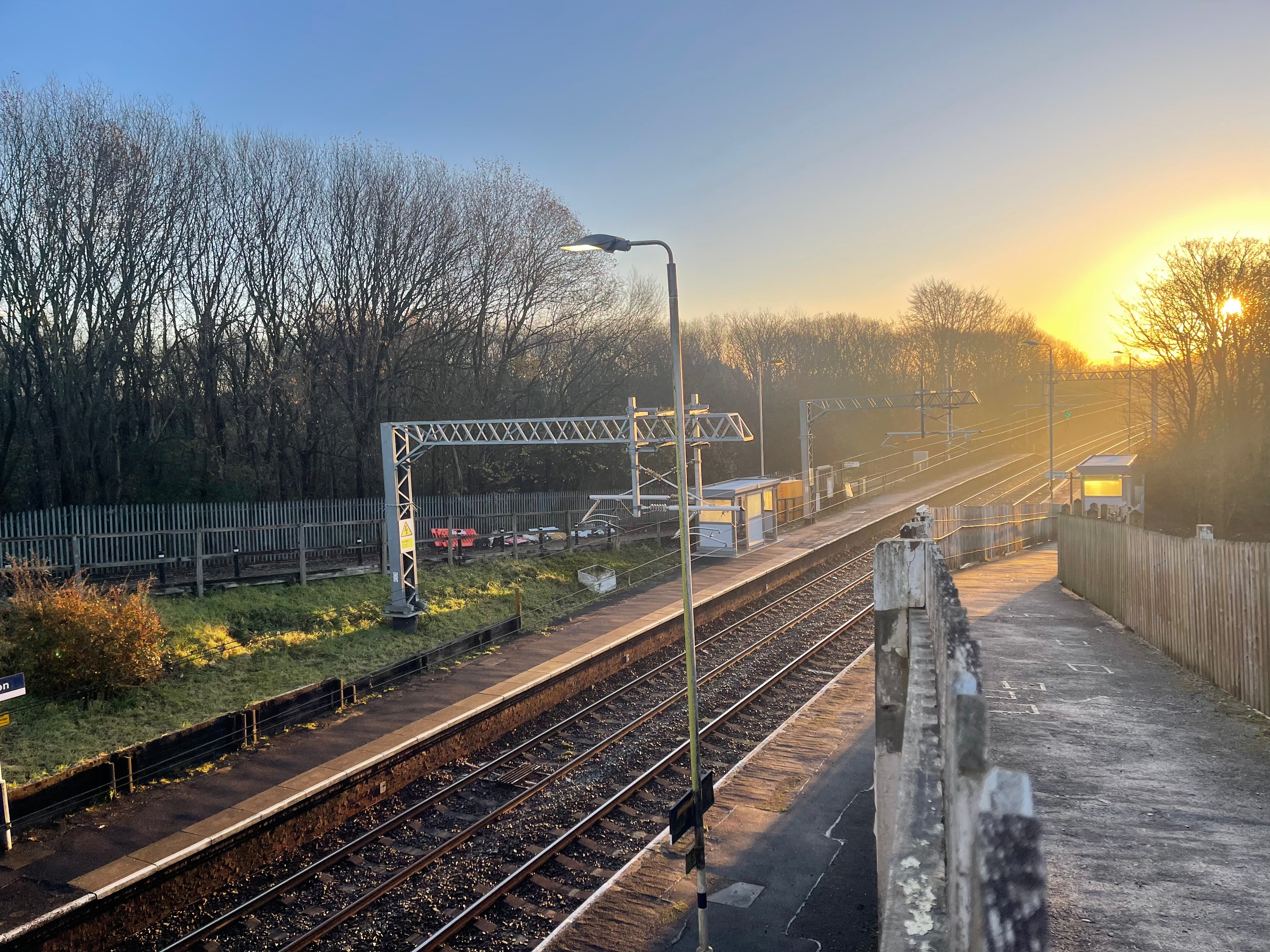
- The ramp leading to the northbound platform in 2023

General information
- Location: Clifton, Salford; England
- Coordinates: 53.5223°N 2.3141°W
- Grid reference: SD793028
- Manager: Northern
- Transit authority: Transport for Greater Manchester
- Platforms: 2

Other information
- Station code: CLI
- Classification: DfT category F2

History
- Original company: East Lancashire Railway
- Pre-grouping: Lancashire and Yorkshire Railway
- Post-grouping: London, Midland and Scottish Railway

Key dates
- June 1847: Opened as Clifton Junction
- 6 May 1974: Renamed Clifton

Passengers
- 2021/22: ▲140
- 2022/23: ▲208
- 2023/24: ▼202
- 2024/25: ▲1,102
- 2025/26: ▲1,224
Location
Notes
- Passenger statistics from the Office of Rail and Road

Clifton railway station is a railway station in Clifton, Greater Manchester, England which was formerly called Clifton Junction. It lies on the Manchester–Preston line.

== History ==
The railway line between Salford and Bolton, the Manchester and Bolton Railway (M&BR), opened in 1838, but had no stations between Agecroft Bridge and Ringley. In 1844, the Manchester, Bury and Rossendale Railway (MB&RR) was authorised to build a line from a junction with the M&BR at Clifton, to Rawtenstall. It opened to the public on 28 September 1846, by which time the MB&RR had amalgamated with other companies to become the East Lancashire Railway, and the M&BR had itself amalgamated with the Manchester and Leeds Railway; the M&LR became the Lancashire and Yorkshire Railway in 1847.

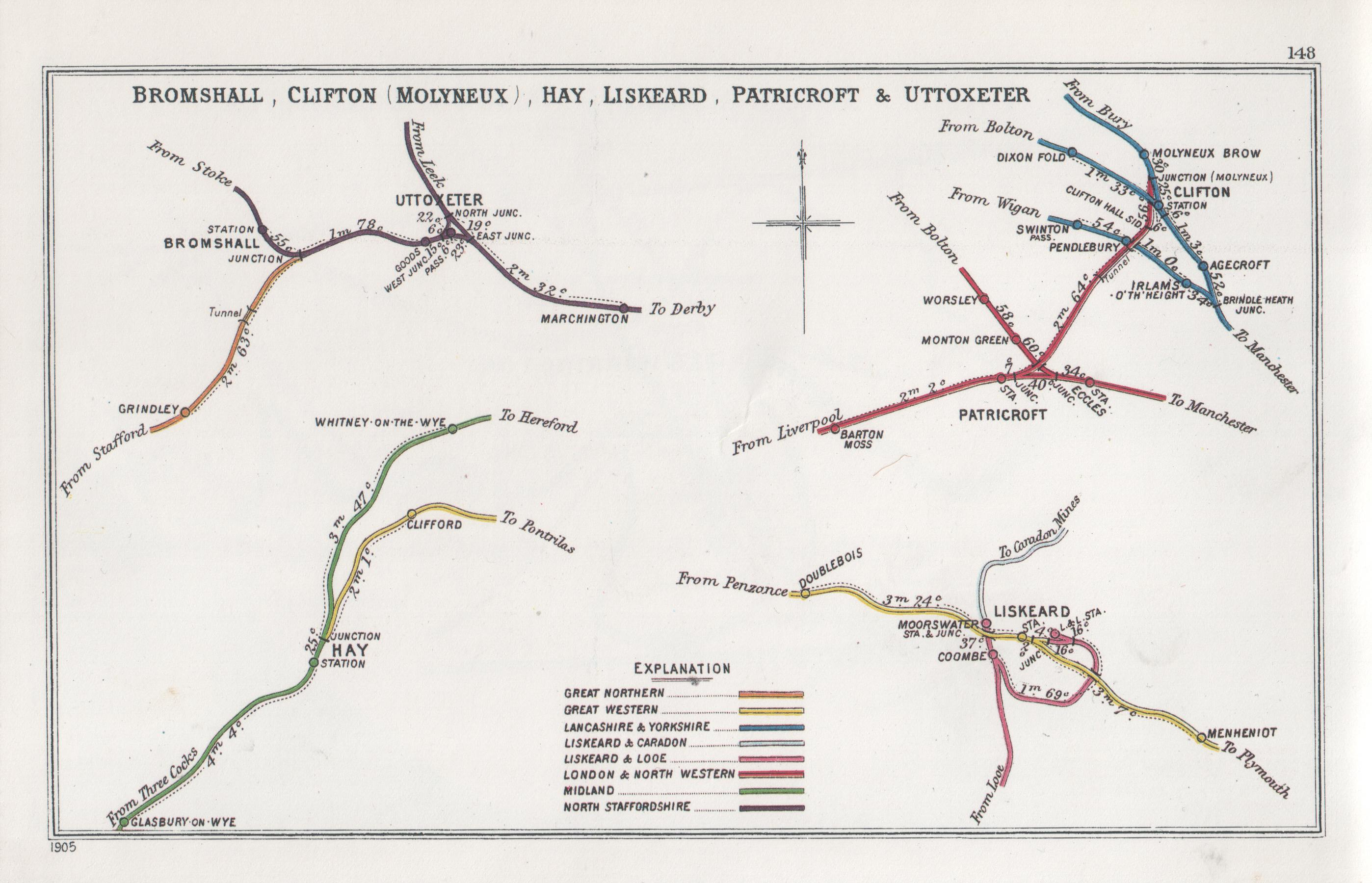
A 1905 Railway Clearing House Junction Diagram showing (upper right) railways in the vicinity of Clifton

The Bury line ran northward from the junction, crossing the Irwell Valley on the Clifton Viaduct (known locally as the "13 arches"), to run on the opposite side of the valley from the Bolton line. A station at the junction, with two platforms for each route (Bolton or Bury), opened in June 1847, and was named Clifton Junction.

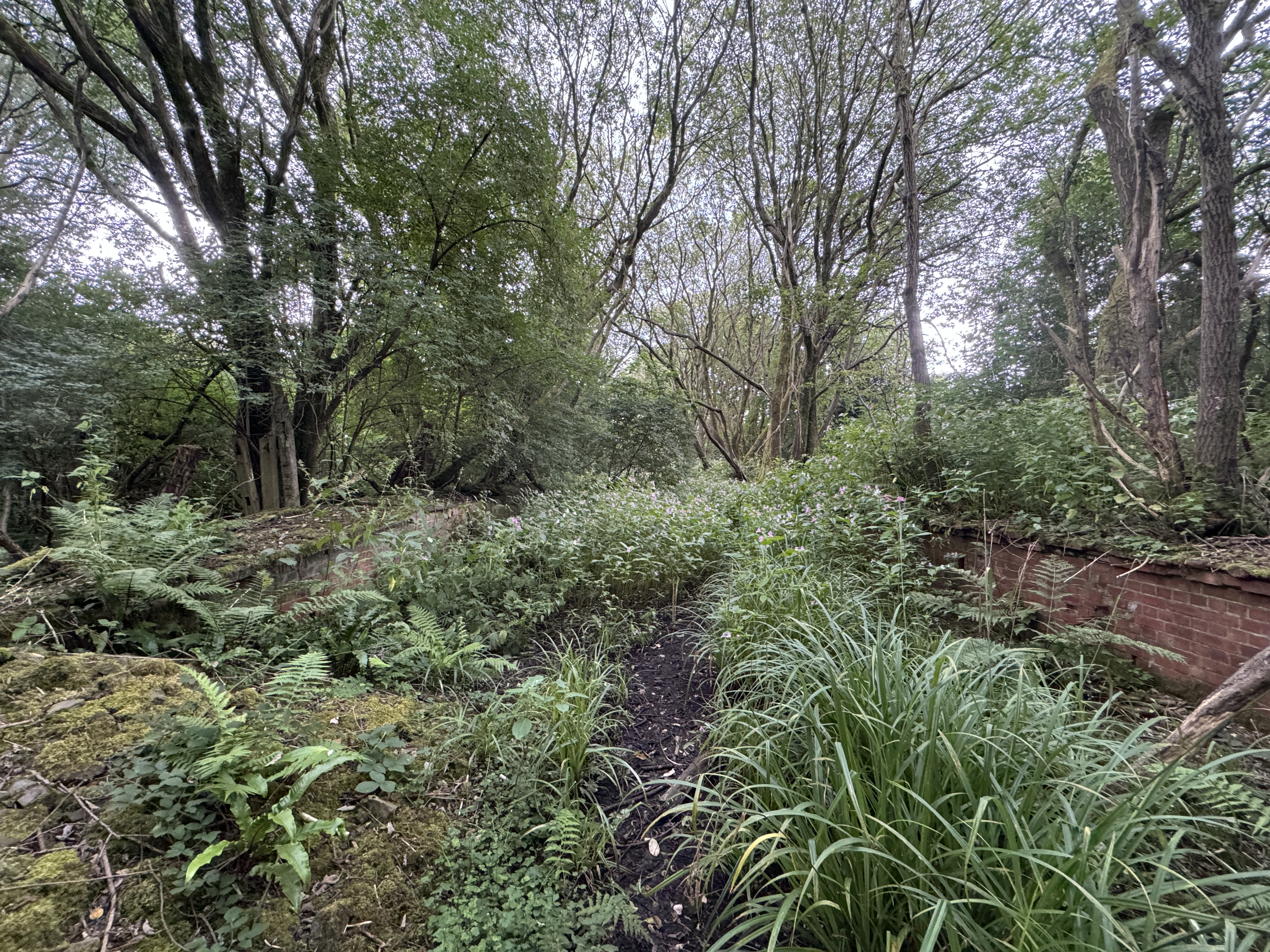
Looking southbound from in between the (now heavily overgrown) former platforms that served Bury and Accrington.

The line to Bury closed in 1966 along with the platforms that served it, with the tracks being lifted in 1968. The old Bury and Accrington platforms are still intact (though heavily overgrown) in the woodland that now occupies the site of the junction behind the modern station, and the viaduct remains a Grade II listed local landmark.

On 6 May 1974 the station was renamed Clifton, (even though the area has become known as Clifton Junction), and in the 1990s the service was reduced to one train per day in each direction.

The closest station to Clifton Junction with a regular service is Swinton 1.25 miles (2.01 km) away on the line between Manchester and Wigan Wallgate via Atherton.

Local industry made good use of Clifton Junction railway station long before the advent of mass car ownership when three factories were established close by enabling employees and visitors access by train. The three factories were Magnesium Elektron Ltd, Chloride Batteries Ltd and Pilkington's Tiles Ltd.

== Services ==
The service at Clifton railway station is very limited in the current 2024 timetable (and has been since 1992), with just one train calling in each direction between Stalybridge and Southport per day - southbound (at 08:36) in the morning peak and northbound (at 18:20) in the evening. The single daily service each way was suspended between May 2015 and the December 2015 timetable change due to the ongoing modernisation work at Farnworth Tunnel, with a replacement bus provided instead. The station reopened on schedule on 14 December 2015.

Electric service commenced on Monday 11 February 2019, initially utilising Class 319 electric multiple units.

There is no Sunday service.

Preceding station	National Rail	Following station
Kearsley	Northern Trains Manchester–Preston line Limited service	Salford Crescent
	Disused railways	
Dixon Fold; Line open, station closed	Lancashire and Yorkshire Railway; Manchester and Bolton Railway	Agecroft Bridge; Line open, station closed
Molyneux Brow; Line and station closed	Lancashire and Yorkshire Railway; East Lancashire Railway	Agecroft Bridge; Line open, station closed
