= Shawclough and Healey railway station =

Former railway station in England

Coordinates: 53.6315°N 2.1771°W

Shawclough and Healey
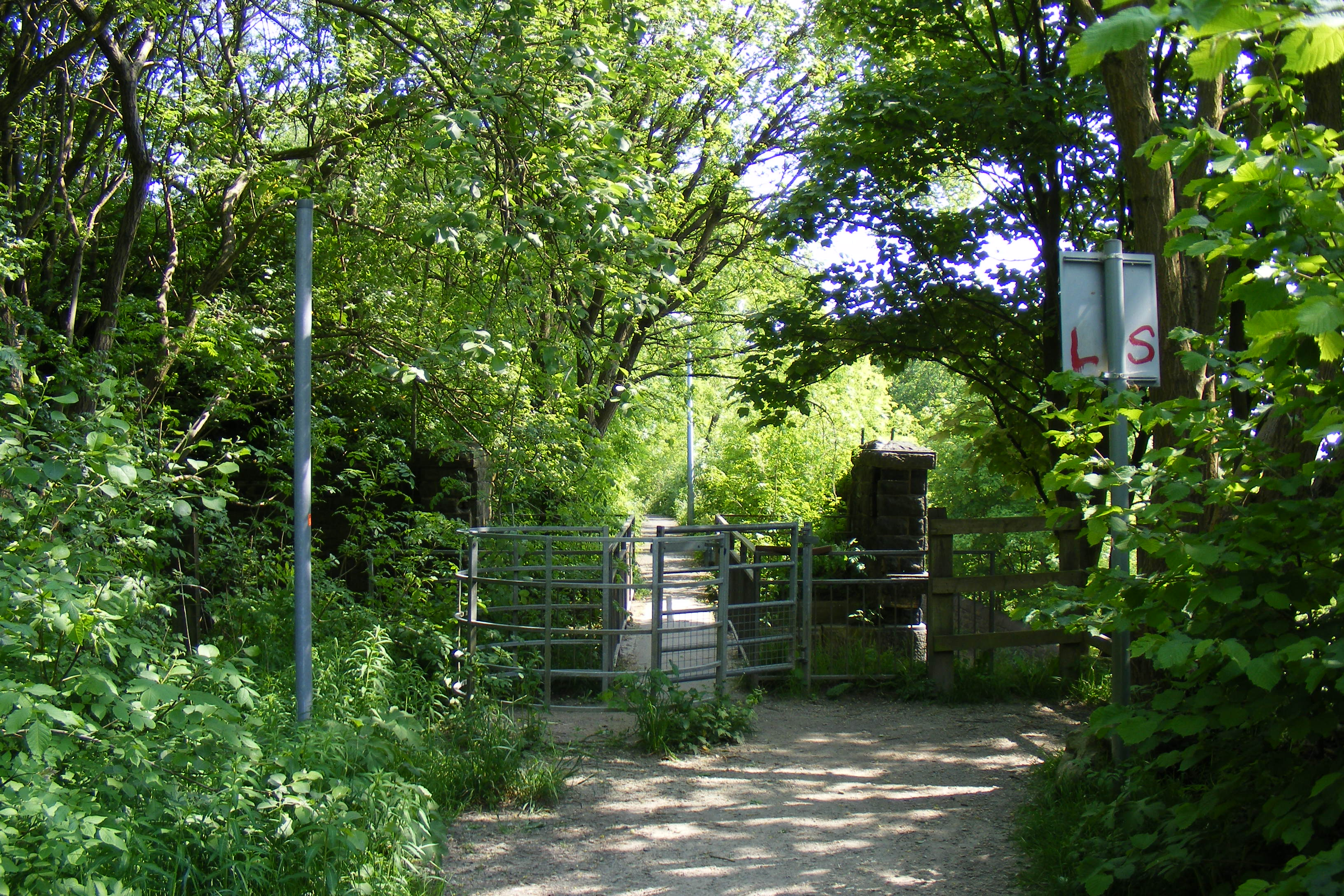
- The site of the station in May 2008

General information
- Location: Shawclough and Healey, Rochdale; England
- Grid reference: SD883150
- Platforms: 2

Other information
- Status: Disused

History
- Original company: Lancashire and Yorkshire Railway
- Pre-grouping: Lancashire and Yorkshire Railway
- Post-grouping: London, Midland and Scottish Railway

Key dates
- 1 November 1870: Opened
- 2 April 1917: Closed
- October 1919: Reopened
- 16 June 1947: Closed
Location

Shawclough & Healey railway station served the townships of Shawclough and Healey in Rochdale, now in the Metropolitan Borough of Rochdale in Greater Manchester, England, from 1870 until closure in 1947.

Preceding station	Disused railways	Following station
Wardleworth	L&YR; Rochdale to Bacup Line	Broadley
