= Broadley railway station =

Disused railway station in England

Broadley
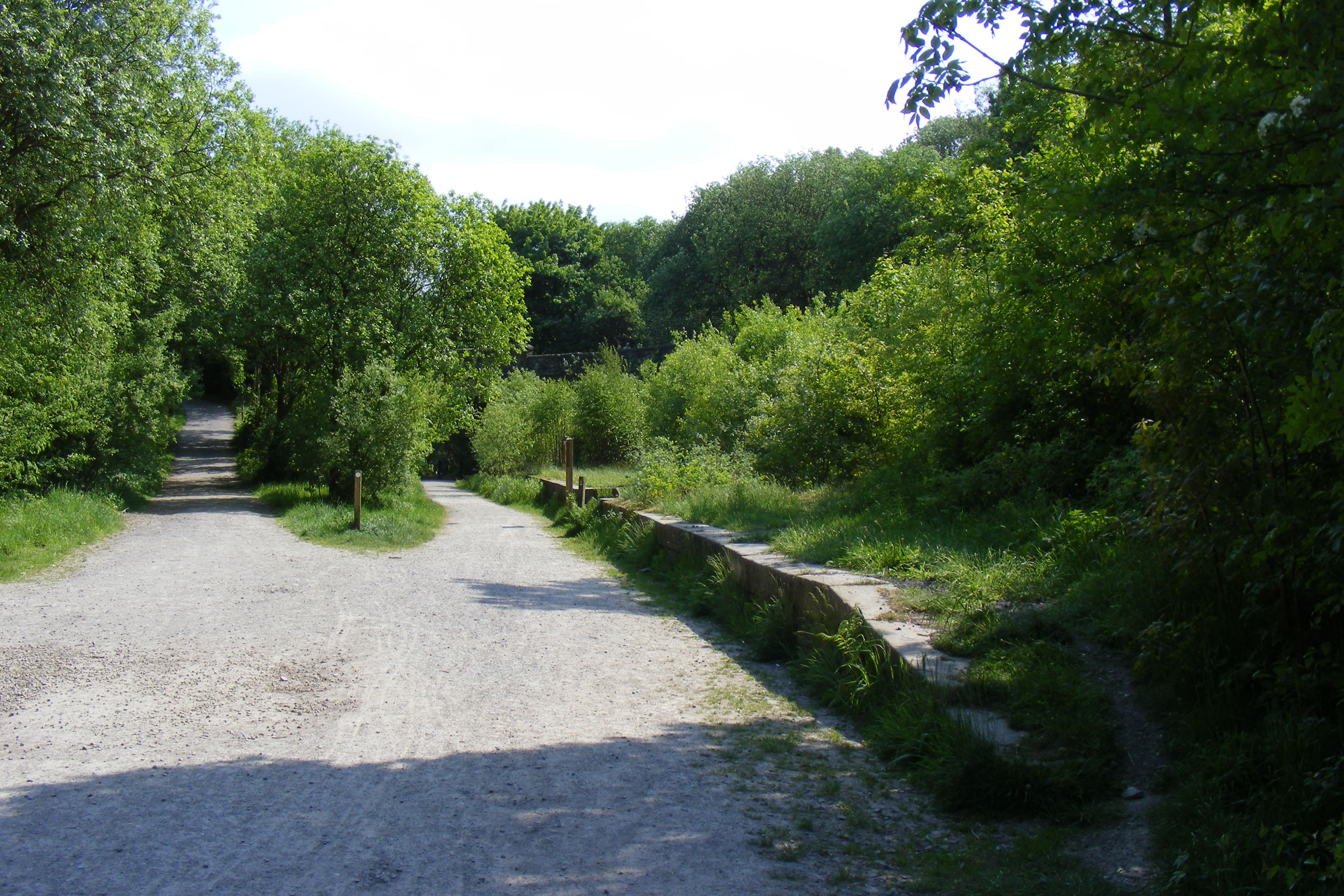
- The site of the station in May 2008

General information
- Location: Broadley, Rochdale; England
- Coordinates: 53.64275°N 2.18383°W
- Grid reference: SD879163
- Platforms: 1

Other information
- Status: Disused

History
- Original company: Lancashire and Yorkshire Railway
- Pre-grouping: Lancashire and Yorkshire Railway
- Post-grouping: London, Midland and Scottish Railway

Key dates
- 1 November 1870: Opened
- 16 June 1947: Closed to passengers
- 12 August 1963: Closed for goods
Location

Broadley railway station served Broadley in Rochdale, England, from 1870 until closure in 1947.

The station was opened on 1 November 1870 when the Lancashire and Yorkshire Railway (L&YR) opened the Rochdale to Facit section of its line to Bacup.

It was situated on the western side of the railway where it was crossed by Station Road, to the west of Broadley village.

The station had one platform on the western side of the line accessed by a footbridge adjacent to the road overbridge. There were two wooden buildings on the platform with a signal box between them.

There was a passing loop at the station and a two siding goods yard on the opposite side of the line accessed from Station Road, it was equipped with a five ton crane.

By 1929 the station buildings had been replaced with the new hip-roofed wooden building relocated further north along the platform. The signal box had also been replaced with the new box still further north of the station building.

The station closed to passengers on 16 June 1947, initially as a temporary measure due to a fuel crisis, but the station never re-opened and the closure was confirmed as permanent in 1949. The station closed to goods traffic on 12 August 1963 when the line was closed.

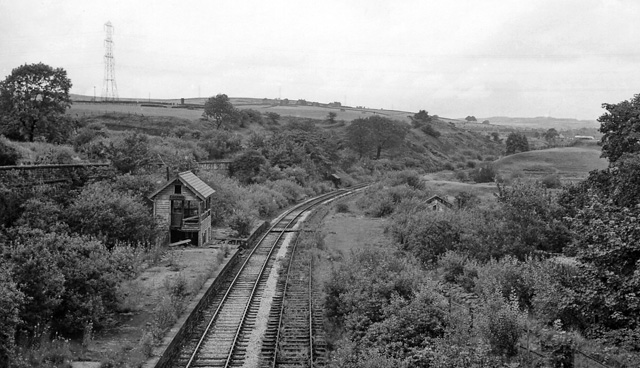
The remains of Broadley station in 1963

Preceding station	Disused railways	Following station
Shawclough & Healey	L&YR; Rochdale to Bacup Line	Whitworth

== Bibliography ==
- Christiansen, Rex (July 1977). "Pennine Anniversaries". The Railway Magazine. Vol. 123, no. 915. pp. 326–327. ISSN 0033-8923.
- Hurst, Geoffrey (1992). Register of Closed Railways: 1948-1991. Worksop, Nottinghamshire: Milepost Publications. ISBN 0-9477-9618-5.
- Quick, Michael (2023) [2001]. Railway passenger stations in Great Britain: a chronology (PDF). version 5.05. Railway & Canal Historical Society.
- The Railway Clearing House (1970) [1904]. The Railway Clearing House Handbook of Railway Stations 1904 (1970 D&C Reprint ed.). Newton Abbot: David & Charles Reprints. ISBN 0-7153-5120-6.
