= Waterfoot railway station =

Station in Lancashire, England (1848–1966)

Waterfoot

General information
- Location: Waterfoot, Rossendale; England
- Coordinates: 53.6918°N 2.2525°W
- Grid reference: SD834217
- Platforms: 2

Other information
- Status: Disused

History
- Original company: East Lancashire Railway
- Pre-grouping: Lancashire and Yorkshire Railway
- Post-grouping: London Midland and Scottish Railway

Key dates
- 27 March 1848: Opened as Newchurch; terminus of line
- 1 October 1852: Line extended to Bacup
- 1 August 1881: Renamed Waterfoot for Newchurch
- by 1922: Renamed Waterfoot
- 5 December 1966: Station closed
Location

Waterfoot railway station served Waterfoot, Rossendale near Rawtenstall, Lancashire, England from 1848 until the line closed in 1966.

== History ==
The railway line from Rawtenstall to Bacup, an extension of the East Lancashire Railway (ELR), was authorised on 27 July 1846. Construction began in 1847, and it was intended that it would be completed by 1 December the same year. The route required tunnels beyond Newchurch, and the expense of these meant that construction was curtailed, and the line was opened as far as Newchurch, where a station was opened on 27 March 1848.

Construction of the line onwards to Bacup resumed in 1851, and this was opened on 1 October 1852. The ELR amalgamated with the Lancashire and Yorkshire Railway on 13 May 1859. The whole line between Rawtenstall and Bacup was single-track at first; work to double the track began in 1878, and was completed in 1881.

The station, originally named Newchurch, was renamed Waterfoot for Newchurch on 1 August 1881; and the name was simplified to Waterfoot by 1922.

The station was closed on 5 December 1966.. The station was demolished after closure and there are no remains.

== Route ==
Preceding station	Disused railways	Following station
Clough Fold	Lancashire and Yorkshire Railway; Rawtenstall to Bacup Line	Stacksteads
