= Healey Dell Viaduct =

Viaduct in Rochdale, England

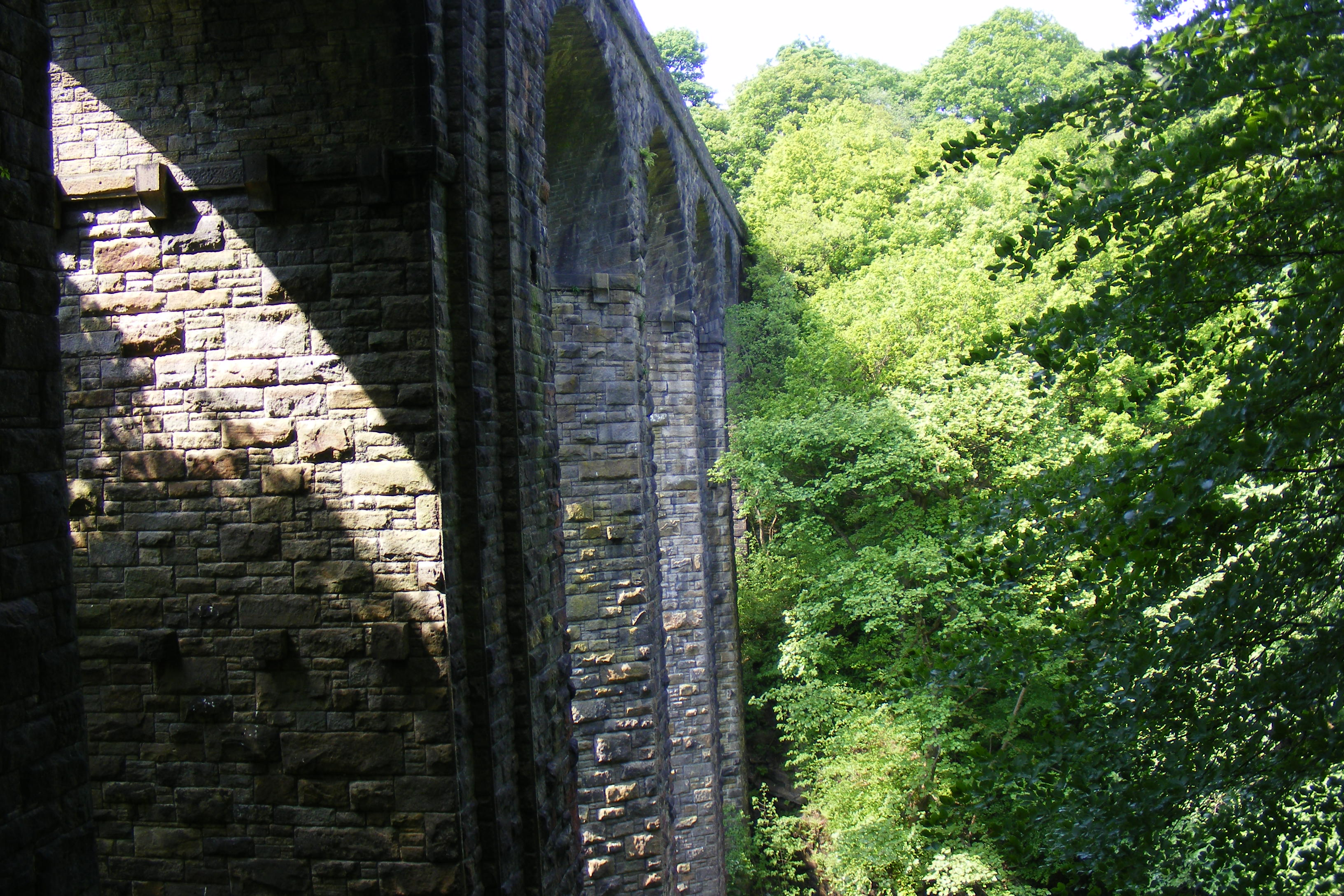
- The viaduct, from the dell
- Coordinates: 53°38′24″N 2°10′56″W
- Carries: National Cycle Network
- Crosses: River Spodden
- Locale: Healey Dell; Rochdale; Greater Manchester; England

Characteristics
- Material: Gritstone
- Height: 105 ft (32 m)
- No. of spans: Eight

History
- Construction end: 1867
- Closed: 1960s

Location
- Interactive map of Healey Dell Viaduct

Healey Dell Viaduct is a viaduct situated in Healey Dell Nature Reserve in the Spodden Valley, on the outskirts of Rochdale in Greater Manchester, England. It is 2.5 miles (4.0 km) from Whitworth, Lancashire. It was built in 1867 and carried the Rochdale to Bacup Railway Line, opening to passengers on 1 November 1870. It operated until 1949, and carried coal trains until into the 1960s.

The viaduct was built from locally quarried gritstone and only a single track wide. It is 105 ft (32 m) high above the river, with eight arches, each with a 30 ft (9.1 m) span.

In November 1984, the viaduct was Grade II listed.

Today it carries the National Cycle Network, Regional Network Route 92 which joins National Route 66.

Healey Dell is on the Rochdale Way and the Pennine Bridleway passes the northern end.

== Gallery ==
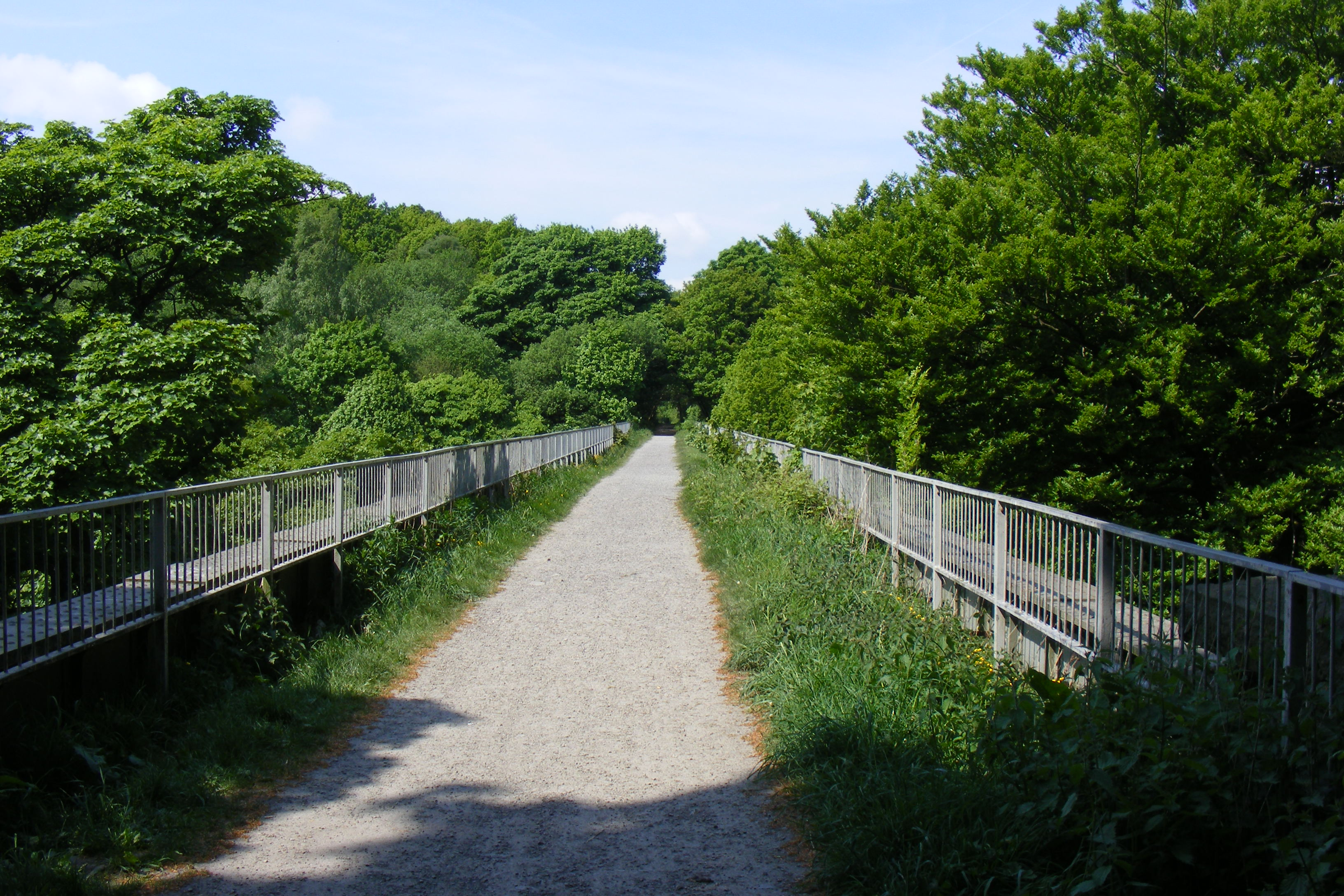
Healey Dell Viaduct trackbed
