= Falinge Park High School =

Location
- Falinge Road; Shawclough, Rochdale, Greater Manchester, OL12 6LD; United Kingdom; 53°37′28″N 2°10′09″W

Information
- Type: High School; Community School
- Motto: Aspire, Thrive, Achieve
- Established: 27 September 1935
- Local authority: Rochdale
- Department for Education URN: 105837 Tables
- Ofsted: Reports
- Chair: Glynis Foster
- Headteacher: Paula O'Reilly
- Gender: Mixed-sex
- Age: 11 to 16
- Enrolment: 1,170 pupils
- Houses: Ashworth; Fields; Royds; Nedderman; Bright
- Publication: FootLights School; Falinge Park Upper School
- Website: https://www.falingepark.com

Falinge Park High School is an 11–16 mixed comprehensive school in the Shawclough area of the Metropolitan Borough of Rochdale in Greater Manchester, United Kingdom and is part of the Watergrove Trust. The school has been recognised as an Investor in People and has gained the International School Award, as well as Artsmark Gold, Sportsmark Gold and the Healthy Schools status. In 2010 Ofsted inspection it was found to be "a good school where pupils rise to the high expectations of the headteacher and staff".

== History ==
The school was founded as Rochdale Municipal High School for Girls in 1935. In 1953 it became Rochdale Grammar School for Girls, with an intake of 350 and in the 1970s it became a 13- to 18-year-old mixed sex school called Greenhill Upper School. Over the years the school's capacity increased to 1,200 through a number of additional buildings. On 31 August 1988 it was renamed Falinge Park Upper School as a result of an amalgamation with another school. The school was renamed again to the school's current name, Falinge Park High School on 31 August 1990, due to a borough reorganisation and the intake changed to the current 11–16 age range.

== Location ==
The school is located in the Shawclough area of Rochdale, bordering Falinge. It is named after the nearby Falinge Park and is situated just across the road from the park itself. The majority of pupils come from the Shawclough, Falinge and Spotland areas of Rochdale, though some pupils travel from areas such as Syke and Norden. The town centre is approximately 10 minutes walk from the main gate to the school, which makes it ideal for the pupils and staff who have to travel via public transport.

== School rebuild ==
Starting August 2012 the school was rebuilt with the construction of a new three-storey building on the site, and a refurbishment of the existing sports hall and gym. The existing specialist ICT accommodation and dance studio were retained. The rebuild project was due to be complete January 2014,. The demolition of old buildings began April 2014 and was completed by June 2014.

Pupils moved into the 'New Build' in January 2014.

A new Modern Foreign Languages (MFL) block has been recently added.

== Notable former pupils ==
- Michael Ratu is a professional rugby league player, who plays for Hull Kingston Rovers. He attended the school until 2004.

=== Watergrove Trust ===
Falinge Park High School became part of the Watergrove Trust on the 1st October 2024.

=== Greenhill School ===
- Michelle Holmes, actress who played Sue (blonde hair) in Rita, Sue and Bob Too
- Liz Kershaw, radio presenter on 6 Music, and formerly Radio 1
- Nick Nuttall, executive at the United Nations Framework Convention on Climate Change in Berlin
