= Broadley =

Broadley is a surname. Notable people with the surname include:

- Alan Broadley (1920–1997), Australian rules footballer
- Alexander Meyrick Broadley (1847–1916), British historian, author, and barrister
- Denise Broadley (1913–2007), British artist
- Donald George Broadley (1932–2016), British herpetologist living in Zimbabwe
- Eric Broadley (1928–2017), British entrepreneur, engineer, founder and former chief designer of Lola Cars
- Henry Broadley (1793–1851), British Conservative politician who sat in the House of Commons from 1837 to 1851
- Henry Harrison-Broadley (1853–1914), British Conservative politician who sat in the House of Commons from 1906 to 1914
- Ian Rank-Broadley (born 1952), British sculptor and coin designer
- Matt Broadley, Swedish video director
- Pascal Broadley (born 1972), English cricketer
- Tom Broadley (1871–1950), English rugby union and rugby league player
- William Harrison-Broadley (1820–1896), British Conservative politician who sat in the House of Commons from 1868 to 1885

== See also ==
- Broadley, Moray, village in Moray, Scotland
- Broadley's dwarf gecko, species of lizard
- Broadley's flat lizard, species of lizard
- Broadley's ridged frog, species of amphibian
- Broadley railway station, which served Broadley in Rochdale, England, from 1870 until 1947
