= Clough Fold railway station =

English railway station from 1871 to 1966

Clough Fold

General information
- Location: Cloughfold, Rossendale; England
- Coordinates: 53.6991°N 2.2723°W
- Grid reference: SD821225
- Platforms: 2

Other information
- Status: Disused

History
- Original company: East Lancashire Railway
- Pre-grouping: Lancashire and Yorkshire Railway
- Post-grouping: London, Midland and Scottish Railway

Key dates
- 1871: Station opens
- 5 December 1966: Station closes
Location

Clough Fold Railway Station served the small hamlet of Cloughfold near Rawtenstall, Lancashire, England from 1871 until the line closed in 1966.

Preceding station	Disused railways	Following station
Rawtenstall	Lancashire and Yorkshire Railway; Rawtenstall to Bacup Line	Waterfoot
