= Stacksteads railway station =

Former railway station in England

Stacksteads
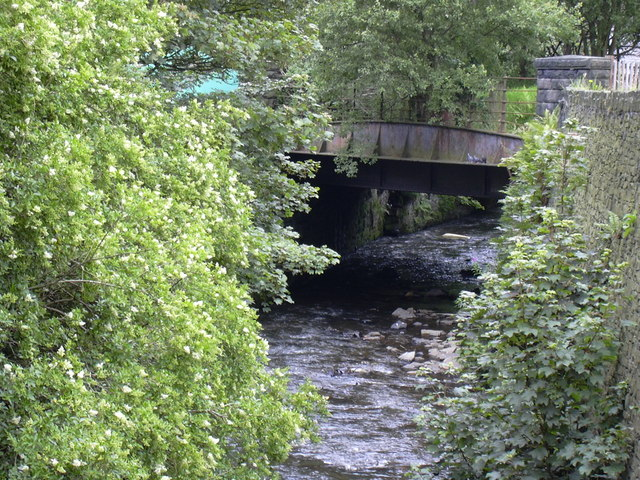
- The bridge over the River Irwell which used to carry the tracks and the station's platform (2007)

General information
- Location: Stacksteads, Rossendale; England
- Coordinates: 53.69092°N 2.22669°W
- Grid reference: SD851216
- Platforms: 2

Other information
- Status: Disused

History
- Original company: East Lancashire Railway
- Pre-grouping: Lancashire and Yorkshire Railway
- Post-grouping: London Midland and Scottish Railway

Key dates
- 1 October 1852: Station opens
- 5 December 1966: Station closes
Location

Stacksteads railway station served Stacksteads near Bacup, Rossendale, Lancashire, England from 1852 until the line closed in 1966. The station was just to the west of Blackwood Road, with the island platform spanning the River Irwell.

== Overview ==
The station was opened on 1 October 1852. It had an island platform providing train services to Bacup and Manchester.

== Route ==
Preceding station	Disused railways	Following station
Waterfoot	Lancashire and Yorkshire Railway; Rawtenstall to Bacup Line	Bacup
