= Britannia railway station =

English railway station from 1881 to 1917

Britannia
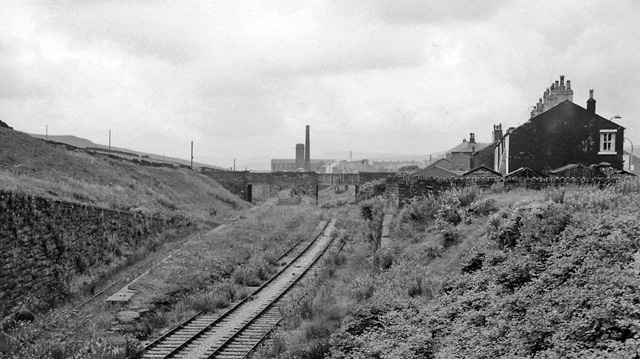
- Site of Britannia Station; View westward, towards Bacup (1963)

General information
- Location: Britannia, Rossendale; England
- Coordinates: 53.6898°N 2.1790°W
- Grid reference: SD884214
- Platforms: 2

Other information
- Status: Disused

History
- Original company: Lancashire and Yorkshire Railway
- Pre-grouping: Lancashire and Yorkshire Railway

Key dates
- 1 December 1881: Station opened
- 2 April 1917: Station closed
Location

Britannia railway station served Britannia near Bacup, Lancashire, England, from 1881 until closure in 1917. The station was just to the west of the summit of the line, which was also the highest point on the entire Lancashire and Yorkshire Railway (LYR) system.

== History ==
The LYR branch line from Rochdale to Facit had opened for goods on 5 October 1870, and to passengers on 1 November 1870. On 18 July 1872 the LYR was authorised to extend the line to Bacup. There were to be two intermediate stations: one was at Shawforth; the other, 7 1/4 miles (11.7 km) from Rochdale, was named Britannia after a nearby public house, the Britannia Inn, which was built in 1821 at the junction of the old and new roads from Bacup. The station was built by Samuel Warburton, who was contracted for the work on 28 July 1880; it had an island platform. The line opened on 1 December 1881, and with it, Britannia station. The station was situated 962 feet (293 m) above sea level, and just to the east of the station was the summit of the line, which at 965 feet (294 m) above sea level was also the highest point on the entire LYR system.

To the west of the station was a skew arch bridge built to carry the Lee Moor Colliery tramway over the railway line.

On 29 August 1891 a goods train of 24 wagons carrying stone from Britannia ran away on the falling gradient of 1 in 34 (3%) and collided with a passenger train at Facit station. Three passengers died and six were injured.

In 1940 a passenger train became stuck in snow for five days at Britannia.

The station closed on 2 April 1917 as an economy measure, although passenger services on the line continued until 16 June 1947. Goods traffic between Facit and Bacup ceased around the same time, but the line was not lifted until at least August 1963.

== Notes ==
Preceding station	Disused railways	Following station
Shawforth; Line and station closed	Lancashire and Yorkshire Railway; Rochdale to Bacup Line	Bacup; Line and station closed
