= Michael Ratu =

Fiji international rugby league footballer

Mike Ratu
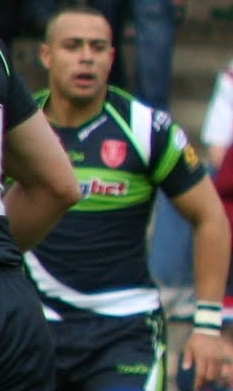

Personal information
- Full name: Michael Ratu
- Born: 16 October 1987 (age 38) Rochdale, Greater Manchester, England
- Height: 5 ft 11 in (1.80 m)
- Weight: 13 st 5 lb (85 kg)

Playing information
- Position: Centre
Club
Years	Team	Pld	T	G	FG	P
2004–09	Leeds Rhinos	6	1	0	0	4
2010	Hull Kingston Rovers	5	1	0	0	4
2011	Halifax	14	3	0	0	12
2013	Rochdale Hornets	35	16	0	0	64
2019	Swinton Lions	1	0	0	0	0
	Total	61	21	0	0	84
Representative
Years	Team	Pld	T	G	FG	P
2009	Fiji	1	1	0	0	4
- Source: As of 21 September 2019

Michael Ratu (born 16 October 1987) is a Fiji international rugby league footballer who played as a centre.

His usual position is centre although he made his First Team début on the wing as a substitute against Salford in August 2007.

== Background ==
Ratu was born in Rochdale, Greater Manchester, England, and played junior rugby at Rochdale Mayfield

== Playing career ==
Before joining Leeds, he played for Higgleshaw Cagies, playing for them when they won the Oldham Cup. He also played for Wigan Academy. He signed a three-year contract with Leeds, despite Wigan offering him a new contract. He played for Leeds' academy from 2004. Although he played for Leeds' first team, he mostly played in the academy. He played for the Fiji in the 2009 Pacific Cup. Ratu later signed a two-year deal with Hull Kingston Rovers. In 2012, Ratu signed for Rochdale.

== Outside rugby ==
Ratu was schooled at Falinge Park High School near Shawclough, Rochdale.

== Honours ==
He has represented England U15s ad U16s and has also played for Lancashire and Fiji.
