= Britannia, Lancashire =

Coordinates: 53.6902°N 2.1748°W

Britannia
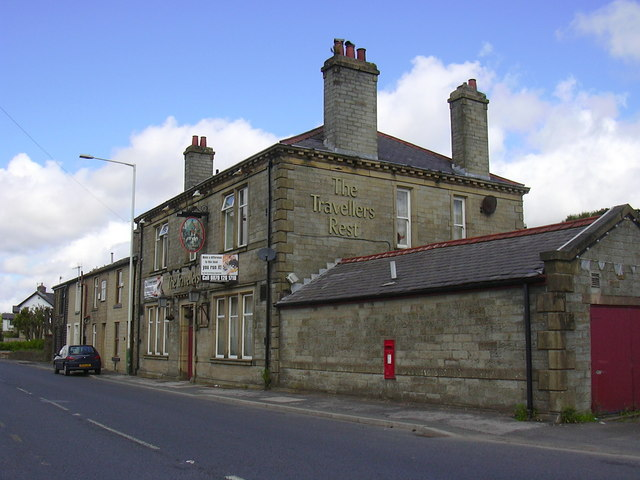
- Former public house at Britannia in 2007

- Location within Rossendale Location within Lancashire
- OS grid reference: SD885215
- District: Rossendale
- Shire county: Lancashire
- Region: North West
- Country: England
- Sovereign state: United Kingdom
- Post town: BACUP
- Postcode district: OL13
- Dialling code: 01706
- Police: Lancashire
- Fire: Lancashire
- Ambulance: North West
- UK Parliament: Rossendale and Darwen

Britannia is a suburb of Bacup in the Rossendale borough of Lancashire, England. It lies on the course of two major roads and has a school and a nature reserve. Rochdale is to the south. Inchfield Moor in West Yorkshire is to the east.

Britannia railway station was on the former Rochdale–Bacup line. Britannia Quarries was a source of employment.

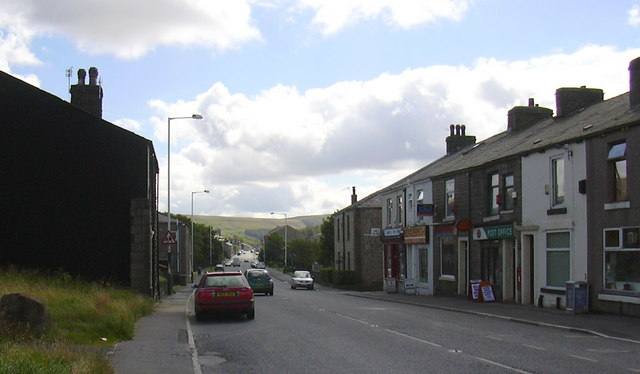
Rochdale Road leaving Britannia in 2007
