= Rushcart =

Traditional ceremony in England

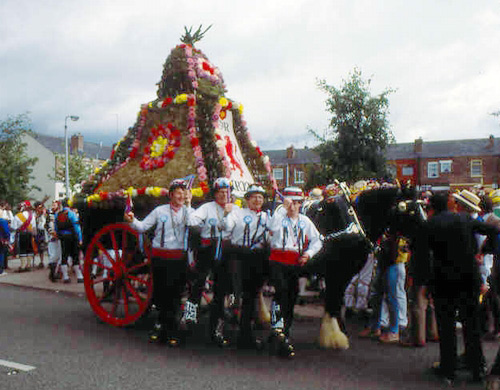
Gorton Morris with their rushcart in Gorton, Manchester, UK

The rushcart ceremony (derived from Rogationtide) is an English tradition where parishioners process around their parish once a year, bearing rushes. They would end up at the parish church and place the rushes on the floor of the church, to replace worn-out rushes. In modern times the ceremony is practised only in parts of northern England including Lancashire and Cumbria.

== History ==
According to John Cutting, the earliest record of rushbearing is 1385 at Tavistock.

The custom of strewing cut vegetation on the floors of churches began at an earlier date: the plants commonly used were hay, straw or rushes and together with strewing herbs they improved the comfort for those using the church. Before the Reformation churches served for many secular as well as religious purposes and seating was not usual until the early years of the 16th century. Renewal of the floor covering was usually carried out before major festivals such as Easter and the patronal festival. Since these were among the few times in the year available for merrymaking ceremonies grew up and were handed down by tradition.

As towns grew in size, the places where rushes still grew were further and further from the church itself. Also changes in the way churches were furnished such as box pews and in the 19th century more effective heating in churches made the ceremonies redundant. The ceremonies either lapsed, or became longer and larger. The earliest depictions of rushcarts are in Rush-Bearing (1891) by Burton. One illustration shows morris dancers and a rushcart at Failsworth Pole, near Manchester, about 1820. Another, from 1821, is a painting by Alexander Wilson of an event at Long Millgate, Manchester. They now appear to be confined to the north west of England. At least 5 rushbearing ceremonies still occur in Cumbria where girls dressed in green process around the town.

The Rushcart grew into a festival held on the annual wakes week or mill holidays. There would be music, dancing and other entertainments. Each village would try to outdo the others by building a bigger or more elaborate structure with the front covered by a sheet decorated with tinsel and artificial flowers and hung with polished copper, brass and silver household items.

Behold the rush-cart, and the throng
Of lads and lasses pass along:
Now, view the nimble morris-dancers,
The blithe, fantastic, antic prancers,
Bedeck'd in gaudiest profusion,
With ribbons in a sweet confusion
Of brilliant colours, richest dyes,
Like wings of moths and butterflies-
Waving white kerchiefs in the air,
And crossing here, re-crossing there,
And up and down, and everywhere:
Springing, bounding, gaily skipping,
Deftly, briskly, no one tripping:
All young fellows, blithe and hearty,
Thirty couples in the party ...
— From The Village Festival by Droylsden poet Elijah Ridings.

The coming of the railways led to a decline in interest in Rushcarts as the local population were able to travel further afield for their annual break. The Rushcarts eventually died out in the early 20th century. There is a curious similarity between this festival and the Hindu festival of the chariot of Jagannath.

== Didsbury ==
France and Woodall in their A New History of Didsbury give the text of an anonymous account of the rushcart perhaps of the 1860s and entries in the churchwardens' accounts for 1733 and 1808 among other statements recorded by local people. It is uncertain when the rushbearing was ended in Didsbury, certainly not before 1870. The associated rowdyism was not thought desirable by the more sober parishioners of the time according to Alfred Burton in his Rushbearing. However Fletcher Moss's Fifty Years of Public Work includes photographs of the Didsbury rushcarts of 1882 and 1911, the last occasion. (If the dates are genuine Burton is either mistaken or it was discontinued for some years and then revived.) In the nearby township of Chorlton cum Hardy, the ceremony took place on the eve of the last Sunday in July though very little is known about how long it continued to be observed.

== Fallowfield ==
An account of the Fallowfield Rushcart was given by Annie C. Williamson in her book about the township (1888). It was part of the Fallowfield Wakes celebrations and often included Robin Hood and Maid Marian seated on a pile of rushes heaped upon a farm cart. The cart was accompanied by the sound of pipes, penny whistles, clogs being used to beat time on the ground, and the shouts of the people.

== Gorton ==
The Gorton rushbearing ceremony was relaunched by the Gorton Morrismen in 1980 having last been celebrated in 1874. It ceased again in 1997 but was resurrected "one last time" in 2009 to celebrate the 100th year of Gorton becoming a part of Manchester.

== Whitworth ==
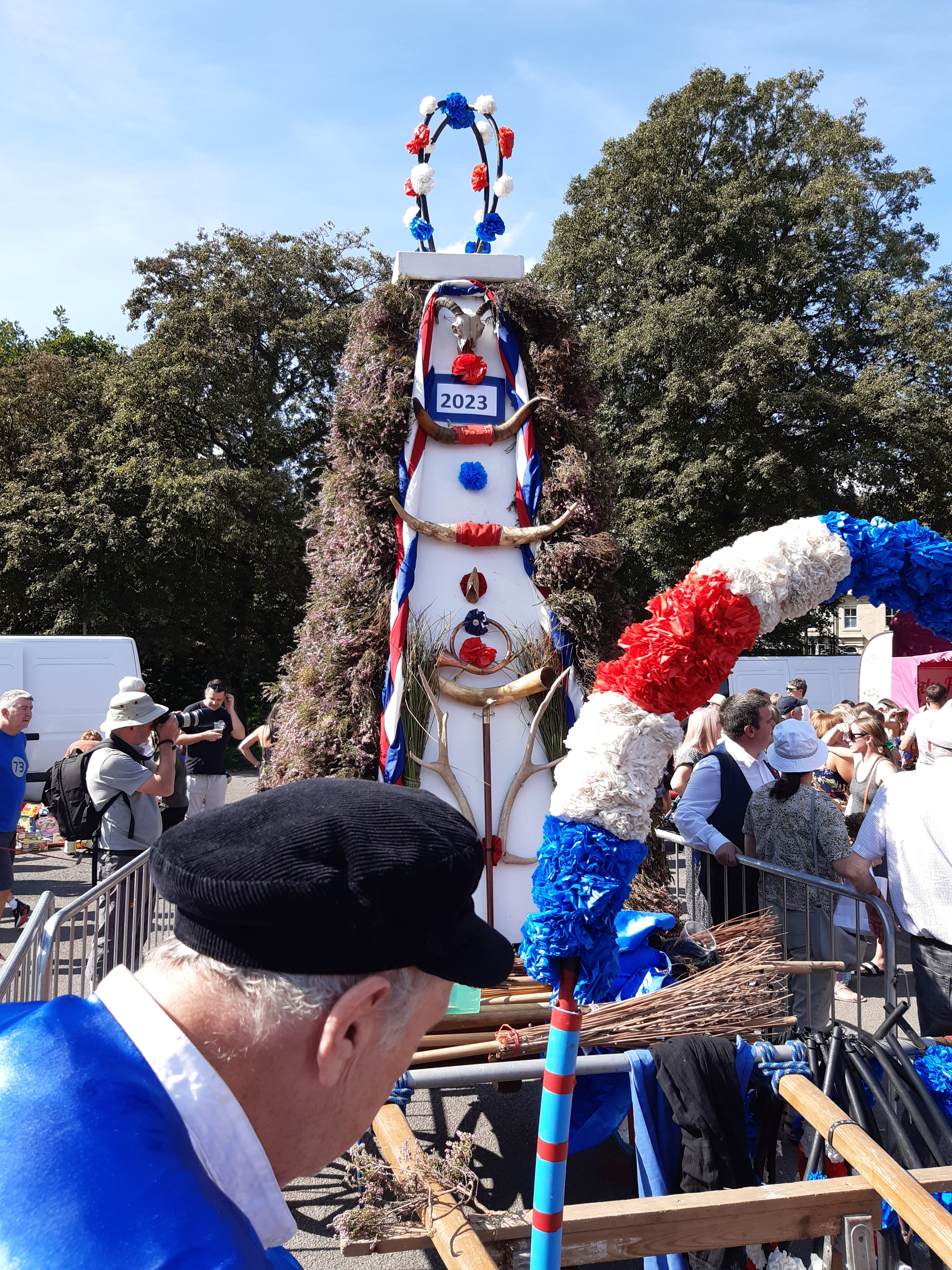
The Whitworth rushcart in early September 2023

The Whitworth rushcart ceremony was relaunched by the Whitworth Community in 1975 having last been celebrated in the mid-1800s. It is one of the last remaining ongoing rushcart celebrations in the UK and is coming up to its 50th year since relaunching.

== See also ==
- Grasmere
- Newchurch in Pendle
- Ripponden
