= Shawforth railway station =

Railway station in Lancashire, England (1881 to 1947)

Coordinates: 53.6812°N 2.1665°W

Shawforth
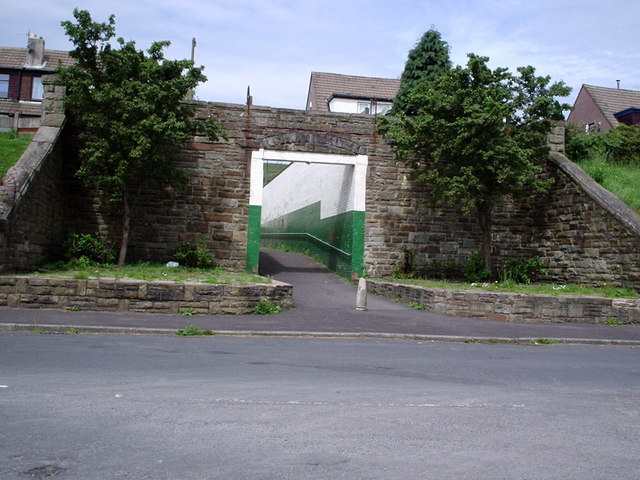
- The site of the station in June 2004

General information
- Location: Shawforth, Rossendale; England
- Grid reference: SD890205
- Platforms: 2

Other information
- Status: Disused

History
- Original company: Lancashire and Yorkshire Railway
- Pre-grouping: Lancashire and Yorkshire Railway
- Post-grouping: London, Midland and Scottish Railway

Key dates
- 1 December 1881: Station opened
- 16 June 1947: Station closed
Location

Shawforth railway station served Shawforth near Bacup, Rossendale, Lancashire, England, from 1881 until closure in 1947.

Preceding station	Disused railways	Following station
Facit	L&YR; Rochdale to Bacup Line	Britannia
