= Brown Wardle Hill =

Brown Wardle
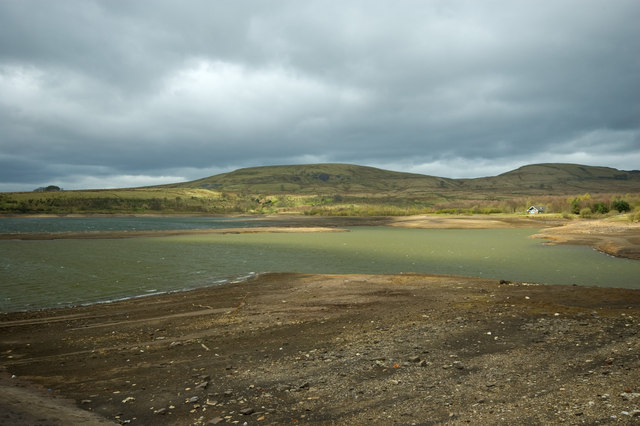
- Brown Wardle from Watergrove Reservoir

Highest point
- Elevation: c.400 metres (1,312 ft)
- Coordinates: 53°39′52.85″N 2°9′15.59″W

Geography
- Location within Greater Manchester Location within Lancashire Location within the Borough of Rossendale
- Location: Wardle, Greater Manchester, England
- OS grid: SD899187

Brown Wardle is a hill between the village of Wardle, Greater Manchester and the town of Whitworth, Lancashire, England. The summit is on the border of Greater Manchester and Lancashire and stands 1,314 feet (401 m) above sea level, making it one of the highest points in Rochdale and Greater Manchester. It forms part of the South Pennines, lying within the historic county boundaries of Lancashire.
