= Roch Valley Viaduct =

Coordinates: 53.619606°N 2.140753°W

Roch Valley Viaduct was a viaduct built in the 1860s in Rochdale, historically in Lancashire, now within Greater Manchester, that carried the Rochdale to Bacup railway line between Rochdale and Wardleworth stations.

It was demolished in 1972. A trial explosion was carried out at one arch at the section over the River Roch, and inadvertently, the rest of the viaduct came down as well. Nobody was hurt, but gas and water mains were disrupted and a road was blocked.
