= Ewood Bridge =

Ewood Bridge may refer to:

- Ewood Bridge, former Haslingden F.C. football ground, also used by Stand Athletic F.C.
- former name of Ewood Park, ground of Blackburn Rovers F.C.
- Ewood Bridge and Edenfield railway station, in Rossendale
