= Whitworth railway station =

English railway station from 1870 to 1947

Coordinates: 53.655936°N 2.177989°W

Whitworth
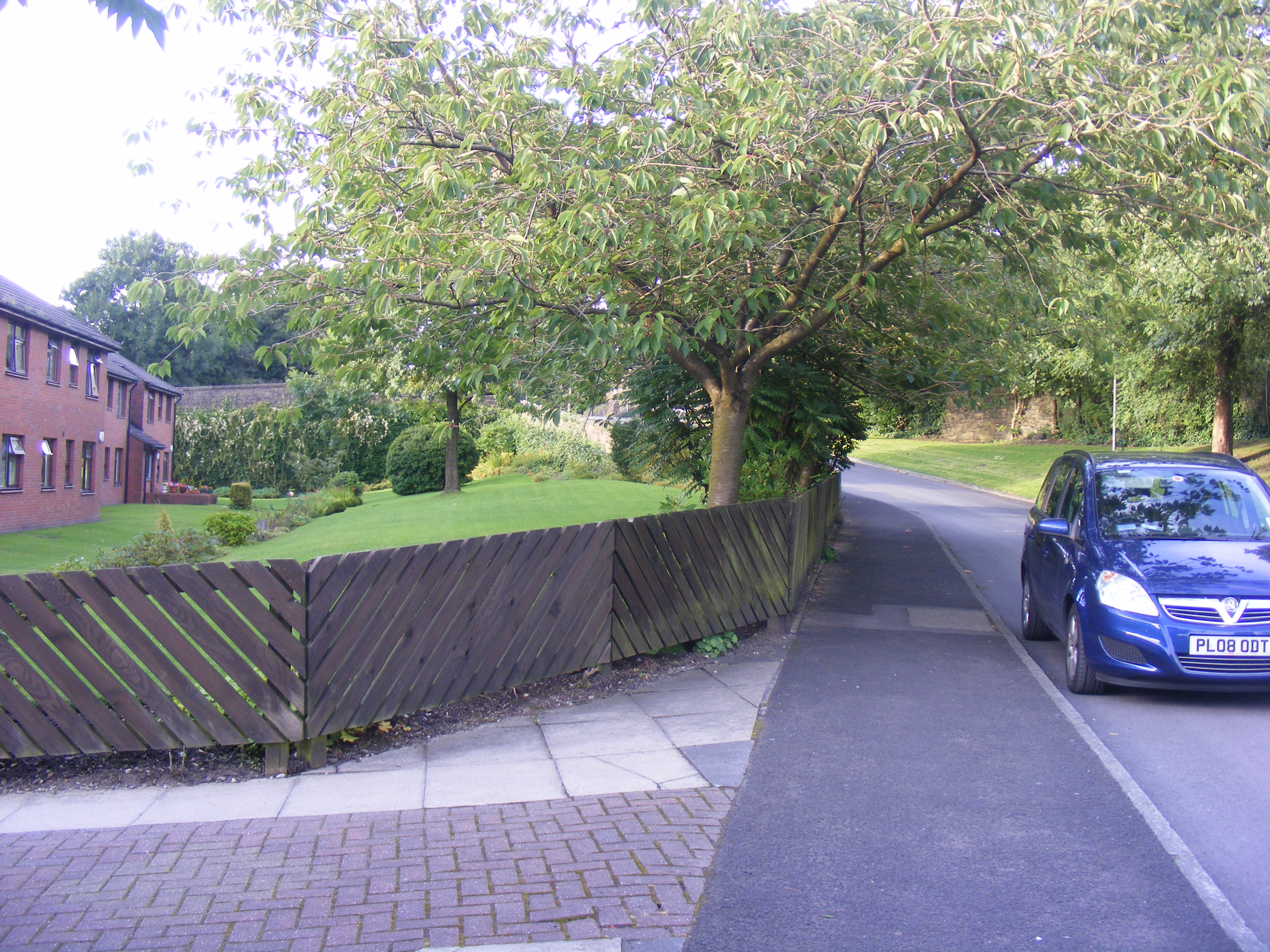
- The site of the station in August 2009

General information
- Location: Whitworth, Rossendale; England
- Grid reference: SD883176
- Platforms: 1

Other information
- Status: Disused

History
- Original company: Lancashire and Yorkshire Railway
- Pre-grouping: Lancashire and Yorkshire Railway
- Post-grouping: London, Midland and Scottish Railway

Key dates
- 1 November 1870: Opened
- 16 June 1947: Closed for passengers
- 21 August 1967: closed for freight
Location

Whitworth railway station served the town of Whitworth, Rossendale, Lancashire, England, from 1870 until closure in 1947.

Preceding station	Disused railways	Following station
Broadley	L&YR; Rochdale to Bacup Line	Facit
