= Listed buildings in Whitworth, Lancashire =

Whitworth is a civil parish in Rossendale, Lancashire, England. It contains 25 listed buildings that are recorded in the National Heritage List for England. All of the listed buildings are designated at Grade II, the lowest of the three grades, which is applied to "buildings of national importance and special interest". The parish contains the town of Whitworth and stretches along a valley. It is largely residential with some agriculture in the surrounding countryside. The older listed buildings consist mainly of houses, farmhouses and farm buildings. Later buildings include churches and associated structures, the viaduct of a disused railway, and three cemetery chapels.

== Buildings ==
Name and location	Photograph	Date	Notes
Barn, Taylor Street; 53.65568°N 2.17525°W	—	1691	A sandstone barn with quoins and a corrugated sheet roof, in three bays. The gable wall facing the road contains a blocked chamfered doorway with a massive inscribed lintel, five round-headed ventilation slits, and a circular owl hole.
Orchard Cottage; 53.65569°N 2.17489°W	—	1692	A stone roughcast house with a stone-slate roof in two storeys and with three bays. In the first bay is an old doorway, above which is a datestone. The second bay contains a modern stone porch. The windows vary, some of them containing mullions.
Old Farmhouse, Cock Hall Farm; 53.66105°N 2.18393°W	—	c. 1700	The former farmhouse is in sandstone with a stone-slate roof. It has two storeys, and a T-shaped plan, with a two-bay main range, and a one-bay rear extension. The doorway has a chamfered surround, large jambs, and a rectangular lintel. The windows are mullioned.
28 and 30 Tong Lane; 53.66402°N 2.17851°W	—	1721	Originally a farmhouse, later converted into two dwellings, the building is in sandstone with a stone-slate roof. There are two storeys and four bays with a single-storey gabled porch. The porch contains a doorway with an inscribed lintel. Some of the windows are mullioned, and others have been altered.
Old Parsonage; 53.65537°N 2.17116°W	—	Early 18th century	A sandstone house with quoins and a tiled roof in two storeys. It has two bays with an additional bay set back at the left. There is a single-storey porch with a stepped three-light window. Most of the other windows are mullioned. There is a modern flat-roofed extension to the rear.
26 Tong Lane; 53.66373°N 2.17806°W	—	1748	A sandstone house with a stone-slate roof in two storeys. It has an L-shaped plan, with a three-bay main range and a one-bay service wing. The garden wall incorporates a datestone.
32 Tong Lane; 53.66409°N 2.17850°W	—	18th century	A cottage in sandstone with a stone-slate roof, with two storeys and two small bays. The doorway has a plain surround, and one of the windows is mullioned.
Old House Farmhouse; 53.68824°N 2.16851°W	—	18th century	A farmhouse and barn, each with two bays, in sandstone with a stone-slate roof, and with two storeys. The left gable wall projects and rises above the rest of the building, it has an embattled and stepped pierced parapet. There is also a segmental-arched wagon entrance, three ventilation holes, and a six-light mullioned window.
Stocks; 53.65512°N 2.17228°W		18th century (probable)	The stocks are in the churchyard of St Bartholomew's Church. They consist of two stone slabs with rounded heads that contain wooden rails to house two pairs of legs.
Three Cottages, Cock Hall Farm; 53.66123°N 2.18405°W	—	18th century	The cottages are in stone with stone-slate roofs, and have two storeys and a front of two bays. Each cottage has a plain doorway, one with a slab cornice, and windows that are square or mullioned.
The Briars; 53.65526°N 2.17318°W		1763	The house was extended to the rear in the 19th century. It is in sandstone with quoins and a slate roof containing three skylights. The house has two storeys, a basement and an attic, and has a symmetrical front of two bays. The windows have plain surrounds containing top-hung casements. In the rear extension is a tall sashed stair window.
118 Market Street; 53.64443°N 2.18047°W	—	Late 18th century	Originally a pair of cottages, later combined into one dwelling, in sandstone with rusticated quoins and a stone-slate roof. There are two storeys and two bays, each with a doorway to the right (one of which has been altered to form a window), and a three-light stepped window on each floor. At the rear are two-light mullioned windows.
512 and 514 Market Street; 53.66053°N 2.17383°W	—	Late 18th century	A pair of cottages in sandstone with a stone-slate roof. They have two storeys and each cottage has a one-bay front. Both cottages have a plain doorway to the right and a three-light stepped window in each floor.
535A and 535B Market Street; 53.66009°N 2.17459°W	—	Late 18th century (probable)	A block of four back-to-back cottages, later converted into two dwellings. They are in sandstone with a slate roof, and have two storeys and two bays. On the front are two doorways with plain surrounds, and two stepped three-light windows in each floor. At the rear are two doorways and mullioned windows.
Well House; 53.64072°N 2.16746°W	—	Late 18th century	A sandstone house with some quoins and a stone-slate roof, built on a slope. There are three storeys at the front and two at the back, the top floor having been a loomshop. The house has two bays, with garage doors in the lowest floor, and square windows in the lowest and middle floors. In the top floor is a continuous 14-light mullioned window; some of the lights have been blocked, and others contain casements. To the right of the house is a single-storey conservatory), and at the rear is an entrance in the middle storey reached by steps.
Whitworth House; 53.65536°N 2.17310°W	—	Late 18th century	A wing was added at right angles, probably in the early 19th century, giving the house an L-shaped plan. It is in sandstone with quoins and slate roofs. The house has two storeys, and both the original range and the wing have two bays. Some of the windows are sashes and others are top-hung casements. One doorway has a chamfered surround, and another is plain.
492 and 494 Market Street; 53.66025°N 2.17403°W	—	1794	Originally a pair of cottages, later converted for other uses. The cottages are in sandstone with a slate roof, in two storeys, and each former cottage has one bay. The doorways have plain surrounds. In each of the former cottages is a three-light stepped window, other than the ground floor of No. 494, which has a flat head. Above the doorway of No. 482 is a datestone.
19 Hallfold; 53.65558°N 2.18229°W	—	1827	A house, possibly originally two cottages, in sandstone with a stone-slate roof. It has two storeys and two bays, and a doorway with a plain surround. The windows are stepped, some with three lights, and others with five. In the left gable apex is a datestone.
St Bartholomew's Church; 53.65511°N 2.17105°W		1847–50	The church was seriously damaged by fire and was rebuilt in reduced form in 1988. It is in sandstone with a slate roof, and consists of a nave with aisles, a chancel, and a west tower. The tower has four stages, diagonal buttresses with panels in brick and flint, an arched south doorway, and an embattled parapet with corner pinnacles. There is a polygonal stair turret rising to a greater height with battlements and grotesques. The six-light west window contains Perpendicular tracery. Some of the carvings salvaged from the fire have been re-used as corbels.
Healey Dell Viaduct; 53.63980°N 2.18224°W		1869–70	The viaduct was built to carry a branch of the Lancashire and Yorkshire Railway over the River Spodden, and is now redundant. It is in sandstone, and has an iron span over the road. The viaduct consists of eight semicircular arches with a span of 30 feet (9.1 m), the middle three of which are skewed.
St John the Evangelist's Church; 53.67016°N 2.16998°W		1871	Designed by Medland and Taylor in High Victorian Gothic style, the church is in sandstone and has a slate roof with bands of pink slates. It consists of a nave, a chancel with side offices, and a southwest tower. The tower has four stages, with angle buttresses, a cylindrical stair tower with a conical roof, and an embattled parapet with corner pinnacles.
Methodist Church; 53.65472°N 2.17679°W		Late 19th century	The church, and the attached school, are in sandstone with slate roofs and have two storeys. The church has a rectangular plan with fronts of three and six bays, and the school, at an angle behind, has four bays, and a roof at a lower level. The pedimented face of the church facing the road is symmetrical with giant pilasters and a central doorway with a semicircular fanlight. Around the door is a moulded architrave with a round-headed arch and keystone, a dentilled cornice and a plain frieze. Above it is a tripartite window with round-headed lights. The flanking bays and the sides of the church contain segmental-arched windows in the ground floor and round-headed windows above. In the pediment is an oculus. (Note: Street View in June 2009 shows that the church has been converted for domestic use.)
Central Chapel, Whitworth Cemetery; 53.66725°N 2.16525°W		Late 1870s	The chapel is in sandstone and has a slate roof with bands of green slates, and red ridge tiles. It is in High Victorian Gothic style, and has a steeple rising from the west gable of the nave. The steeple has a two-stage tower with corner pinnacles and a spire with gablets and lucarnes. At the west end of the chapel is a four-light window containing plate tracery, and on the north and south sides are Tudor arched doorways.
North Chapel, Whitworth Cemetery; 53.66738°N 2.16527°W	—	Late 1870s	The chapel is in sandstone and has a slate roof with bands of green slates, and red ridge tiles. It is in High Victorian Gothic style, it has a T-shaped plan, and it consists of a small nave with a south transept. In the west gable wall are seven lancet windows and a rose window with plate tracery, and on the south side is a gabled dormer.
South Chapel, Whitworth Cemetery; 53.66713°N 2.16531°W	—	Late 1870s	The chapel is in sandstone and has a slate roof with bands of green slates, and red ridge tiles. It is in High Victorian Gothic style, it has a T-shaped plan, and it consists of a small nave with a north transept. In the west gable wall are seven lancet windows and a rose window with plate tracery, and on the south side is a gabled dormer.

== Notes and references ==
=== Sources ===
- Historic England, "Barn circa 2 metres west of No. 15 Taylor Street, Whitworth (1164504)", National Heritage List for England
- Historic England, "Orchard Cottage, Whitworth (1073549)", National Heritage List for England
- Historic England, "Old Farmhouse circa 20 metres north of Cock Hall Farmhouse, Whitworth (1317747)", National Heritage List for England
- Historic England, "Nos. 28 and 30 Tong Lane, Whitworth (1317745)", National Heritage List for England
- Historic England, "The Old Parsonage, Whitworth (1317717)", National Heritage List for England
- Historic England, "No. 26 Tong Lane, Whitworth (1361639)", National Heritage List for England
- Historic England, "No. 32 Tong Lane, Whitworth (1317745)", National Heritage List for England
- Historic England, "Old House Farmhouse, Whitworth (1361640)", National Heritage List for England
- Historic England, "Stocks in churchyard of Church of St. Bartholomew circa 5 metres from west gate, Whitworth (1361641)", National Heritage List for England
- Historic England, "Three Cottages circa 4O metres north west of Cock Hall Farmhouse, Whitworth (1073551)", National Heritage List for England
- Historic England, "The Briars, Whitworth (1073553)", National Heritage List for England
- Historic England, "No. 118 Market Street, Whitworth (1361637)", National Heritage List for England
- Historic England, "Nos. 512 and 514 Market Street, Whitworth (1164481)", National Heritage List for England
- Historic England, "Nos. 535A and 535B Market Street, Whitworth (1361638)", National Heritage List for England
- Historic England, "Well House (1164499)", National Heritage List for England
- Historic England, "Whitworth House (1073552)", National Heritage List for England
- Historic England, "Nos. 492 and 494 Market Street, Whitworth (1073547)", National Heritage List for England
- Historic England, "No. 19 Hallfold, Whitworth (1164433)", National Heritage List for England
- Historic England, "Church of St. Bartholomew, Whitworth (1164533)", National Heritage List for England
- Historic England, "Healey Dell Viaduct, Whitworth (1317784)", National Heritage List for England
- Historic England, "Church of St. John Evangelist, Whitworth (1073548)", National Heritage List for England
- Historic England, "Methodist Church, Whitworth (1164488)", National Heritage List for England
- Historic England, "Cemetery Chapel at Whitworth Cemetery (middle of 3) (1361990)", National Heritage List for England
- Historic England, "North chapel at Whitworth Cemetery (1164419)", National Heritage List for England
- Historic England, "South chapel at Whitworth Cemetery (1072783)", National Heritage List for England
- Historic England, Listed Buildings
