= Wardleworth railway station =

Former railway station in England

Coordinates: 53.623°N 2.149°W

Wardleworth
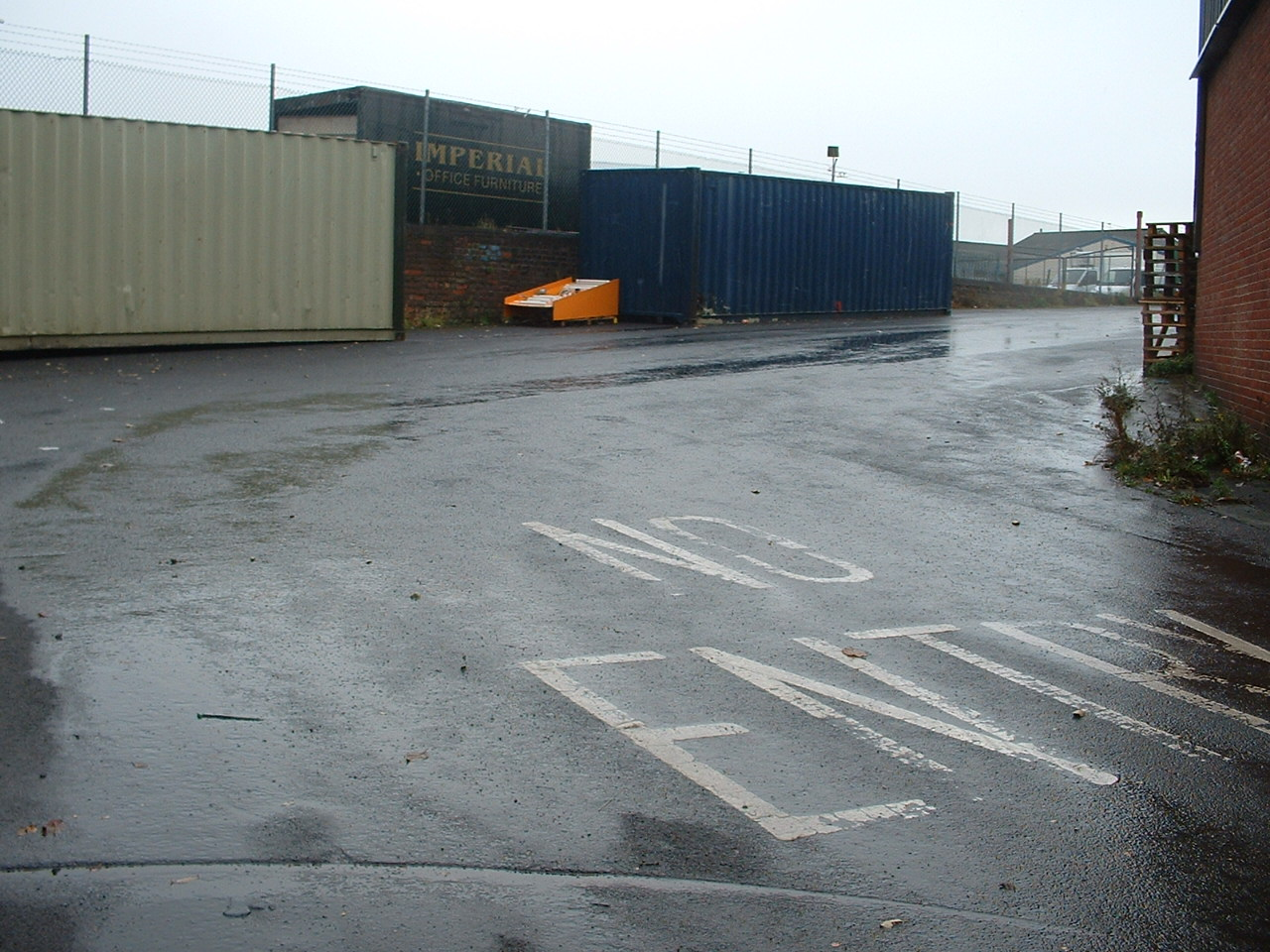
- The site of the station in November 2007

General information
- Location: Wardleworth, Rochdale; England
- Grid reference: SD902140
- Platforms: 2

Other information
- Status: Disused

History
- Original company: Lancashire and Yorkshire Railway
- Pre-grouping: Lancashire and Yorkshire Railway
- Post-grouping: London, Midland and Scottish Railway

Key dates
- 1 November 1870: Opened
- 16 June 1947: Closed
- 7 November 1966: closed for freight
Location

Wardleworth railway station served the township of Wardleworth in Rochdale, in the Metropolitan Borough of Rochdale in Greater Manchester, England, from 1870 until closure in 1947. It was on the Facit Branch between Rochdale and Facit, which was extended to Bacup in 1881. The station was quite well placed for Rochdale town centre and so, in addition to the branch trains, a few other services from Manchester terminated here. Between here and Rochdale station was the Roch Valley Viaduct, now demolished.

Preceding station	Disused railways	Following station
Rochdale; Line closed, Station open	L&YR; Rochdale to Bacup Line	Shawclough and Healey
