= Shawforth =

Coordinates: 53.683°N 2.166°W

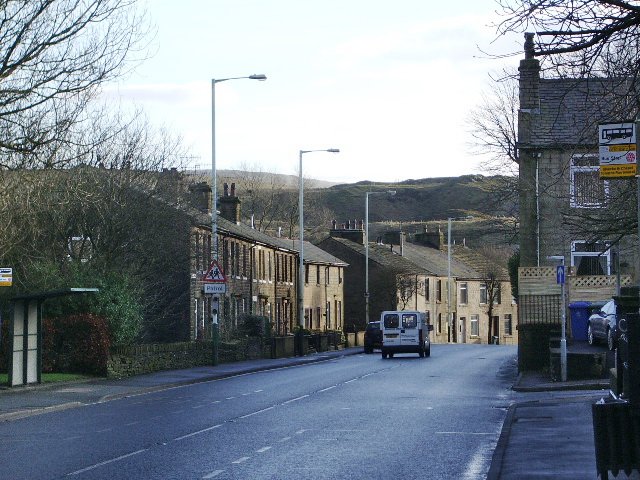
- Market Street

- Location within Rossendale Location within Lancashire
- Population: 3,586 (2011. Ward of Facit and Shawforth)
- OS grid reference: SD892207
  - London: 173 mi (278 km) SSE
- Civil parish: Whitworth
- District: Rossendale
- Shire county: Lancashire
- Region: North West
- Country: England
- Sovereign state: United Kingdom
- Post town: ROCHDALE
- Postcode district: OL12
- Dialling code: 01706
- Police: Lancashire
- Fire: Lancashire
- Ambulance: North West
- UK Parliament: Rossendale and Darwen

Shawforth (/ˈʃɔːfərθ/ SHAW-fərth) is a ward in the township of Whitworth within the Rossendale borough of Lancashire, England. It lies amongst the South Pennines along the course of the River Spodden and A671 road.

Shawforth in the Middle Ages was a hamlet within the township of Spotland and parish of Rochdale.

Shawforth railway station served Shawforth from 1881 until its closure in 1947.

It is part of the Rossendale and Darwen constituency, with Andy MacNae having been the Member of Parliament since 2024.
