= Cloughfold =

Hamlet in Lancashire, England

Coordinates: 53.701°N 2.268°W

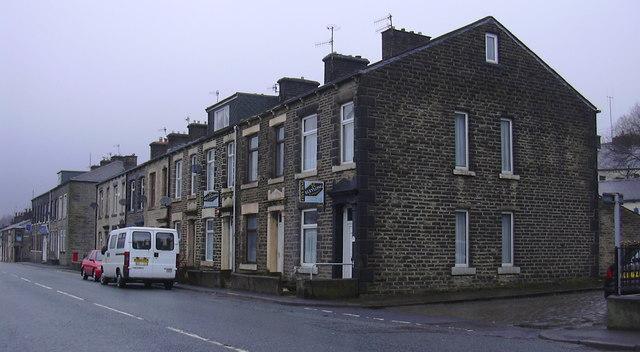
- Bacup Road in 2008

- Location within Rossendale Location within Lancashire
- OS grid reference: SD823227
- District: Rossendale
- Shire county: Lancashire
- Region: North West
- Country: England
- Sovereign state: United Kingdom
- Post town: ROSSENDALE
- Postcode district: BB4
- Dialling code: 01706
- Police: Lancashire
- Fire: Lancashire
- Ambulance: North West
- UK Parliament: Rossendale and Darwen

Cloughfold is a small hamlet in between the towns of Rawtenstall and Waterfoot in the borough of Rossendale, Lancashire, England.

Clough Fold railway station on the Rawtenstall to Bacup Line opened in 1871 and closed when the line closed in 1966.

== Notable people ==
- Caleb Ashworth (1722–1775) an English dissenting tutor.
- Sir David Shackleton (1863–1938) a cotton worker and trade unionist who became the third Labour MP in 1902 until 1910. He was MP for Clitheroe. He later became a senior civil servant.
- Agyness Deyn (born 1983), model and actress
