= Alan Broadley =

Australian rules footballer

Personal information
- Full name: Alan Irwin Broadley
- Born: 13 September 1920; Workington, England
- Died: 23 October 1997 (aged 77)
- Original team: Essendon Reserves / Southern
- Height: 189 cm (6 ft 2 in)
- Weight: 85 kg (187 lb)

Playing career^{1}
Years	Club	Games (Goals)
1941	South Melbourne	3 (1)
- ^{1} Playing statistics correct to the end of 1941.

Alan Irwin Broadley (13 September 1920 – 23 October 1997) was an Australian rules footballer who played for the South Melbourne Football Club in the Victorian Football League (VFL).

== Personal life ==
Broadley served as a corporal in the Australian Army during the Second World War.
