= Broadley, Moray =

Village in Moray, Scotland

Coordinates: 57.6417678020°N 3.016619051748°W

Broadley
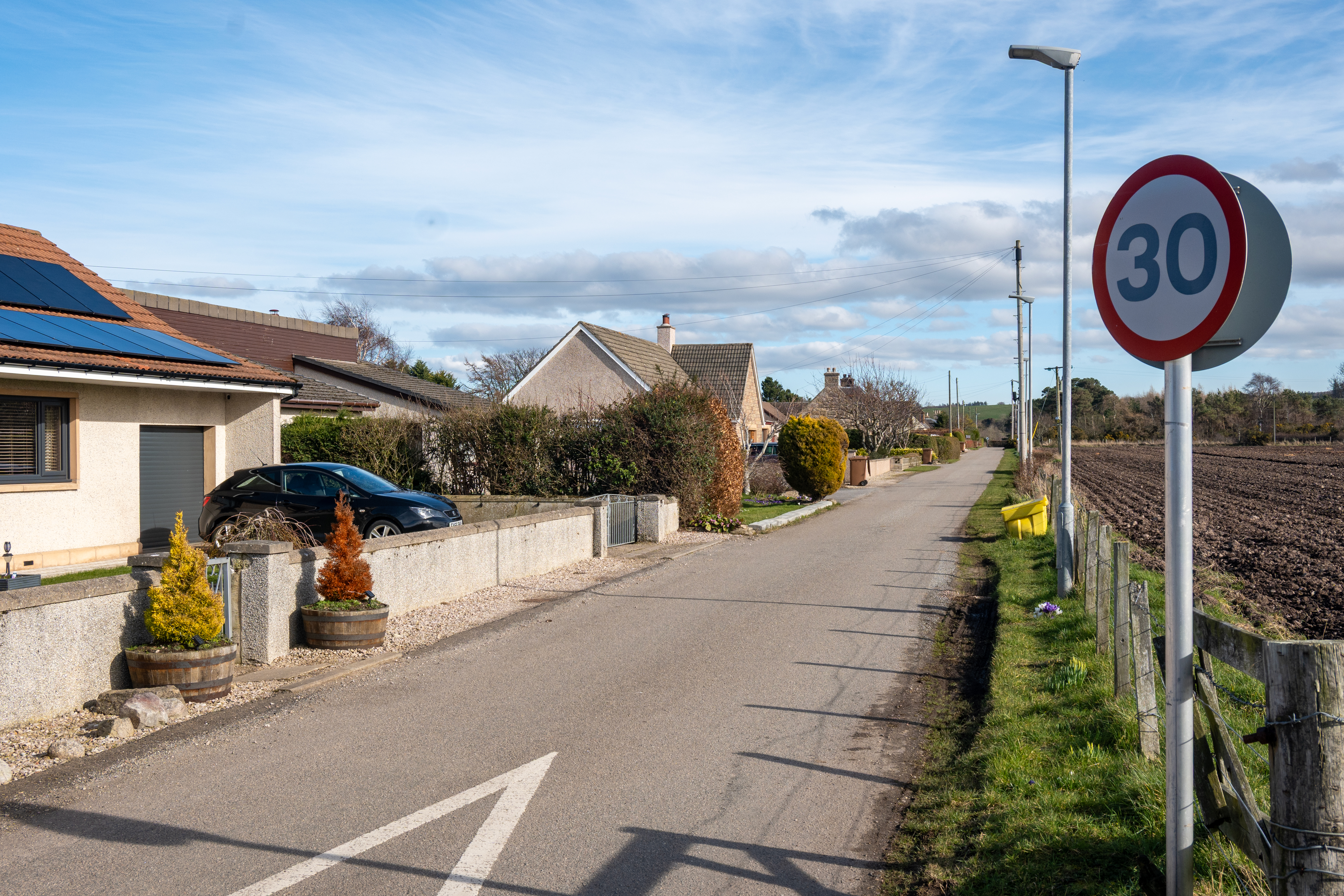

- Location within Moray
- Council area: Moray
- Lieutenancy area: Moray
- Country: Scotland
- Sovereign state: United Kingdom
- Police: Scotland
- Fire: Scottish
- Ambulance: Scottish

Broadley is a small village in Moray, Scotland located about 2.2 miles (3.5 kilometres) south-west of Buckie.

It is the location of the Moray Crematorium.
