= Facit railway station =

Former railway station in England

Coordinates: 53.6682°N 2.1726°W

Facit
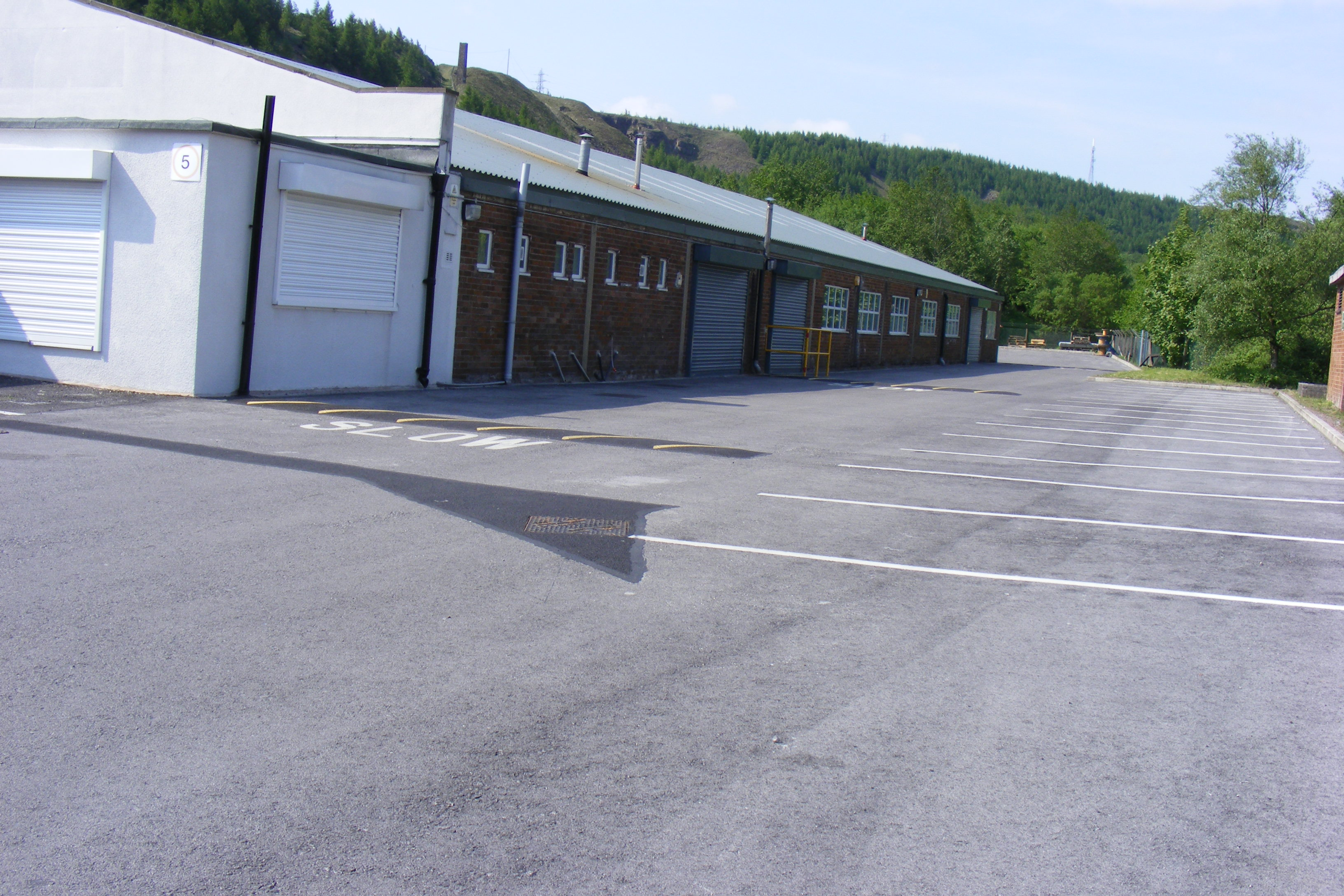
- The site of the station in May 2008

General information
- Location: Whitworth, Rossendale; England
- Grid reference: SD887190
- Platforms: 2

Other information
- Status: Disused

History
- Original company: Lancashire and Yorkshire Railway
- Pre-grouping: Lancashire and Yorkshire Railway
- Post-grouping: London, Midland and Scottish Railway

Key dates
- 1 November 1870: Opened
- 16 June 1947: Closed for passengers
- 12 August 1963: closed for freight
Location

Facit railway station served Facit near Whitworth, Rossendale, Lancashire, England, from 1870 until closure to passengers in 1947 and freight in 1963.

Preceding station	Disused railways	Following station
Whitworth	L&YR; Rochdale to Bacup Line	Shawforth
