= Nick Nuttall =

UN official

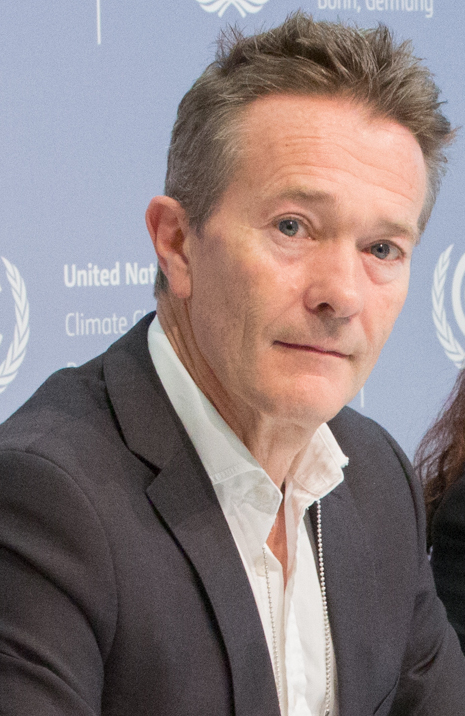
Nick Nuttall in 2016

Nick Nuttall is a freelance communications consultant and former Director of Communications and Outreach and Spokesperson for the UN Environment headquartered in Nairobi, Kenya and the UN Framework Convention on Climate Change headquartered in Bonn, Germany.

He is also a musician having released his first full album of his songs, entitled Just Because Some Bad Wind Blows, on Reptiphon Records in Berlin on 5 May 2023.

== Early life and education ==
Nuttall was born in Rochdale, Lancashire, UK, the son of Ernest and Olive Nuttall. He was educated at Greenhill High School and attended the University of St Andrews.

After graduating, Nuttall held positions as a stock, bond and commodity broker in the UK and the United States, having begun his working life as a singer with the US pop group The Albany Bridge Band.

== Career ==
=== Journalist ===
Before joining the United Nations, he was the Environment and Technology correspondent at The Times from 1989, having worked for various newspapers and magazines including The Daily Telegraph, The Independent the Evening Standard and London Evening News, Woman and Cosmopolitan.

Nuttall was known at The Times for some of the more exotic front-page stories and is thought to be the only journalist in the UK to have a story about a former hairdresser from Hartlepool who had invented a heat shield or coating for the US space shuttle based on doing perms in his salon—printed on 1 April with the Editor's caveat 'This is not an April Fool.'

Nuttall has won various awards including one of the inaugural BT technology journalist of the year awards for a feature in The Times on Teledildonics and The Tidy Britain Group's Queen Mother's Birthday Awards.

=== United Nations ===
==== United Nations Environment Programme ====
Nuttall joined the United Nations Environment Programme in 2001. He was, until December 2013, the spokesperson, principal speechwriter and creative writer for UN Under-Secretary-General and UNEP Executive Director, Achim Steiner. Nuttall joined UNEP in 2001 working for former UNEP Executive Director and former German Minister of the Environment, Klaus Töpfer and is credited with collaborating with Töpfer to develop the UNEP theme "Environment for Development" to re-position UNEP in the early 21st century.

During his time at UNEP, Nuttall was responsible for transforming the organization's media profile and, in collaboration with its Executive Director, inspiring several landmark reports including the 2009 Climate Change Science Compendium; the Natural Fix The Role of Ecosystems in Climate Mitigation and the Dead Planet, Living Planet: Biodiversity and Ecosystem Restoration for Sustainable Development. He also spearheaded the communications aimed at popularizing the concepts and ideas behind UNEP's Global Green New Deal/Green Economy Initiative.

==== United Nations Framework Convention on Climate Change ====
In January 2014, he joined UN Framework Convention on Climate Change. He was responsible for supporting the press and communications of Executive Secretaries Christiana Figueres and Patricia Espinosa and across the Framework Convention’s operations. He was the UN's Spokesperson for the securing of a new universal climate agreement at the 2015 United Nations Climate Change Conference in Paris.

Global Climate Action Summit

Nuttall became Director of Communications and Spokesperson for the Global Climate Action Summit (GCAS)which took place in September 2018 joining the team in March 2018. Here he coordinated the communications efforts of businesses, cities, regional governments and citizens across a bold range of announcements aimed at Taking Climate Ambition to the Next Level by 2020. Nuttall participated in the New American Road Trip which left San Francisco after the Summit and took the outcomes of GCAS in an electric car journey across the United States to the UN in New York in September 2019.

Nuttall also worked as Strategic Communications Director at the Earth Day Network for its 50th anniversary in 2020 and has been a visiting professor on sustainability communications at Tongji University, China. He advises Nouveaux Media which specializes in video and digital marketing. Nuttall is currently Strategic Communications Director and a broadcast presenter for the climate action platform We Don't Have Time and is a member of the trustees of TVE

Nick is also a backing singer with the German-based musician Bernadette La Hengst who also produced Nuttall's first full album, Just Because Some Bad Wind Blows, on 5 May 2023. The title song is about climate change and action; two other songs link to climate and environmental issues and the others range from tall family tales to love and life.
