= Whitworth, Lancashire =

Town in Lancashire, England

Coordinates: 53.663°N 2.177°W

Whitworth
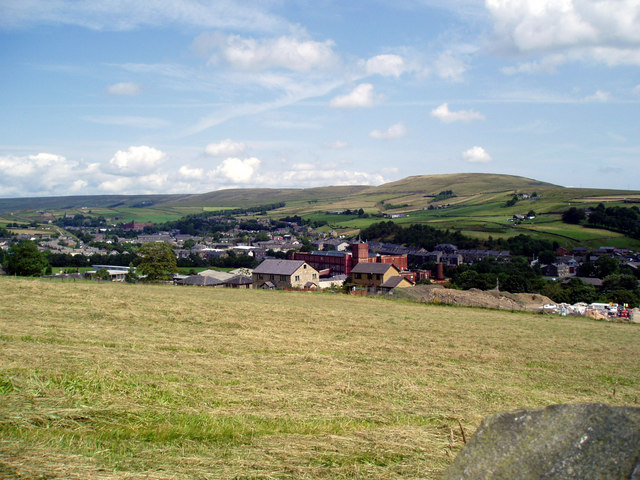
- A view over Whitworth, to Brown Wardle Hill

- Shown within Rossendale Location within Lancashire
- Population: 7,500 (2011 Census)
- OS grid reference: SD882185
- Civil parish: Whitworth
- District: Rossendale
- Shire county: Lancashire
- Region: North West
- Country: England
- Sovereign state: United Kingdom
- Post town: ROCHDALE
- Postcode district: OL12
- Dialling code: 01706
- Police: Lancashire
- Fire: Lancashire
- Ambulance: North West
- UK Parliament: Rossendale and Darwen

Whitworth is a town and civil parish in Rossendale, Lancashire, England, amongst the foothills of the Pennines between Bacup, to the north, and Rochdale, to the south. It had a population of 7,500 at the 2011 Census.

Whitworth spans the Whitworth Valley, a 7 square miles (18.1 km^{2}) area consisting of Healey, Broadley, Whitworth, Facit and Shawforth, linked by the A671 road. Several smaller hamlets are now part of Whitworth, such as Cowm Top, which was removed to make way for Cowm Reservoir.

Whitworth is twinned with Kandel, Germany.

== History ==
=== Early history ===
The early history of Whitworth is unclear; exact dates are difficult to pin down. At the very earliest period, Whitworth was at the edge of the famed and extensive Forest of Rossendale, which covered 22,000 acres (8,900 ha) and reached a point somewhere near Bacup. Flint arrows, stone hammers and spearheads found in the area point to the existence of Mesolithic man who roamed the bleak open moors. Whitworth has a substantial history, notably the Whitworth Doctors who occupied Whitworth House, a property still in existence in Whitworth Square.

In those early years, Whitworth came within the ancient parish of Rochdale which, although vast, was itself a part of the hundred of Salford, one of the main divisions into which the historic county boundaries of Lancashire were divided during Norman times. The Abbot of Whalley Abbey held much of the land in this area.

=== Development ===
The 16th century saw the beginnings of sheep farming, the growth of weaving and eventually the first industry in the area, with coal mining being recorded in the 17th century Industrialisation, however, remained a "household" affair through the 18th century and the settlements of Whitworth, Facit and Shawforth remained villages. Impetus was given to the development of the area through the construction, during the middle of the century, of a turnpike road through the valley. It ran from Manchester via Rochdale and Whitworth to Bacup and then on to Burnley, Colne and Skipton. It was one of the few such roads in East Lancashire and provided a ready means of conveying local goods to Manchester and Yorkshire. The road was of vital importance in Whitworth's industrial expansion and with it, the settlements in the township thus began to grow. By the 19th century, quarrying and coal mining were the chief industries although the manufacture of yarn remained important.

Towards the end of the 19th century a great deal of development was visible including the opening in 1881 of a rail link between Bacup and Rochdale. Passenger services on the railway stopped in 1947. Two reservoirs, at Cowm and Spring Mill, were completed in 1877 and 1887 to augment Rochdale's water supplies. In 1910, a tram service was introduced by Rochdale Corporation, first to Whitworth and later extended to Bacup. Buses replaced these in 1932. The population of Whitworth reached its peak of 9,574 in 1901 following which the recession in industry in the 1930s and the effects of the Second World War saw it decline. The first post war census in 1951 declared a population of 7,442 which declined further to 7,031 by 1961. Since then, however, the figure has risen to its present total of around 7,500.

== Governance ==
Whitworth parish shown within Rossendale

It is part of the Rossendale and Darwen constituency, with Andy MacNae having been the Member of Parliament since 2024.

Local government services in Whitworth are provided by three local authorities; Lancashire County Council, Rossendale Borough Council and Whitworth Town Council.

Whitworth Town Council was formed in 1974 following the Local Government Act 1972, as part of the terms of successor parishes. Prior to this date, Whitworth formed the Whitworth Urban District which was the administrative unit of the valley but was abolished following the reorganisation.

The history of local government in Whitworth began in 1874. The latter end of that century, as has previously been mentioned, saw a great deal of local development. As a result, a local board was set up in 1874 to administer Whitworth. Further independence arrived towards the end of the century with the creation of the Parish of Whitworth, one of nineteen new parishes carved out of the original vast Rochdale Parish. Complete independence came in June 1894 when an urban district council replaced the Local Board. The first meeting was held on 3 January 1895 and the first chairman was William Ernest Whitworth. With this, Whitworth had become ecclesiastically and administratively autonomous from its neighbour. However, in 1974 when Whitworth Urban District was abolished and Whitworth was absorbed into the newly created Rossendale Borough.

The town council consists of twelve elected members and a part-time town clerk. Its mission statement is "To improve the quality of life for the community of Whitworth". The town council acts as a pressure group upholding the rights and values of Whitworth, a sounding board for local opinion and a centre for promoting the town's historical, cultural and social identity.

=== Councillors ===
Whitworth's current mayor is Councillor Janet Whitehead and the current deputy mayor is Councillor Louise Burton. They lead a twelve strong council made of six councillors representing two wards. Facit & Shawforth to the north of the town, and Healey & Whitworth to the south.

Ward	Councillor	Party
Facit & Shawforth	Tom Aldred	Labour
Facit & Shawforth	Louise Burton	independent
Facit & Shawforth	David Chorlton	independent
Facit & Shawforth	Kim Olaolu	Independent
Facit & Shawforth	Sarah Rhodes	Independent
Facit & Shawforth	Janet Whitehead	Independent
Healey & Whitworth	Michael Whitworth	Community First
Healey & Whitworth	Gareth Baron	Reform UK
Healey & Whitworth	Alan Neal	Community First
Healey & Whitworth	Scott Smith	Conservative
Healey & Whitworth	Mackenzie Ritson	Reform UK
Healey & Whitworth	Stephen Butterworth	Reform UK

The town is also served by 3 councillors on Rossendale Borough Council.

Ward	Councillor	Party
Whitworth	Scott Smith	Conservative
Whitworth	Alan Neal	Community First
Whitworth	Mackenzie Ritson	Reform UK

The town is also served by one member of Lancashire County Council.

Ward	Councillor	Party
Whitworth and Bacup	Daniel Matchett	Reform UK

== Geography ==
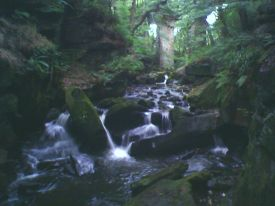
River Spodden running through Healey Dell.

Situated between the towns of Bacup to the north and Rochdale to the south, the town is built around the Whitworth Valley in the Pennines.

In April 1976, an area in and surrounding Healey Dell, at the south end of the valley became legally designated as a statutory local nature reserve. A prominent feature of Healey Dell is the railway viaduct which stands 150 feet above the River Spodden, which rises in the Lancashire Pennine hills above Whitworth and proceeds south through Healey Dell and on to Rochdale, where it merges with the River Roch.

Brown Wardle is a hill between Whitworth and the village of Wardle The summit is on the border of Greater Manchester and Lancashire and stands 1,312 ft (400m) above sea level. The hill is part of the South Pennines, lying within the historic county boundaries of Lancashire.

Whitworth experiences a temperate maritime climate, like much of the British Isles, with relatively cool summers and mild winters. There is regular but generally light precipitation throughout the year.

== Communal facilities ==
Whitworth Community High School is the town's high school.

The facilities available in Whitworth for the pursuit of sports, although limited, are varied, and in some instances unique. Chief among these is water sports. Whitworth Waterski and Recreation Centre based at Cowm Reservoir provides integrated facilities for both the able bodied and the disabled.

It specialises in providing for the latter but facilities for all include water skiing, inflatables and banana rides. Whitworth Leisure Centre in John Street was opened in June 2003 thanks largely to the efforts of the Community Leisure Association of Whitworth (CLAW). The centre, which replaced the defunct Whitworth Swimming Pool, caters for a variety of activities including swimming in the refurbished pool. The location of Whitworth close to high moorland, and Brown Wardle Hill in particular, makes it an ideal venue for hang gliding while the rugged quarry areas make for interesting motor sports.

More usual sporting activities are also catered for including golf at Lobden Golf Club, crown green bowls at Festival Park Bowling Club and fishing care of Whitworth Angling Club.

Construction of a new civic hall on Market Street in Whitworth began in early 2006 after the previous hall was destroyed by an electrical fire on 6 December 2003. The new hall is called "The Ashcroft" and is run by the Community Leisure Association of Whitworth (CLAW). It was officially opened at 2.00pm on Saturday, 28 October 2006.

A number of football clubs exist in the area, the most senior of which is the Whitworth Valley Football Club.

== Gallery ==
View from Brown Wardle looking out over Watergrove Reservoir, formerly the site of the town of Watergrove.

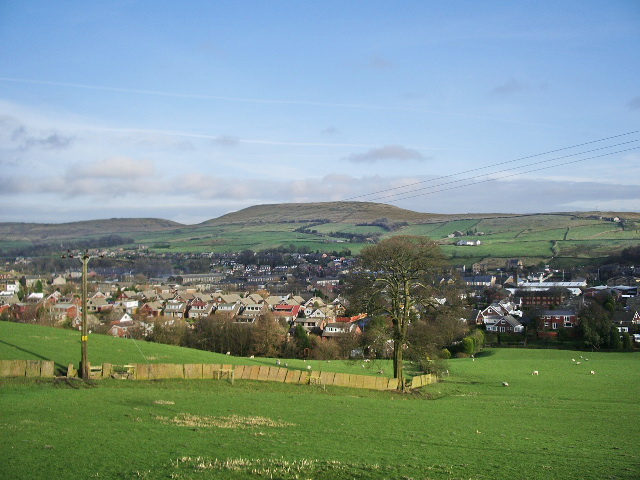
View of Brown Wardle from Cock Hall

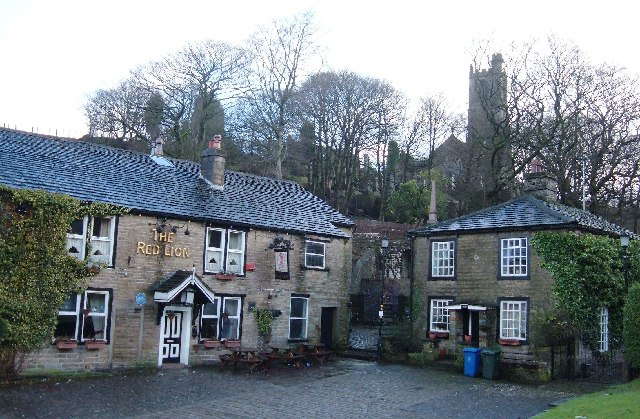
Red Lion pub, Whitworth Square

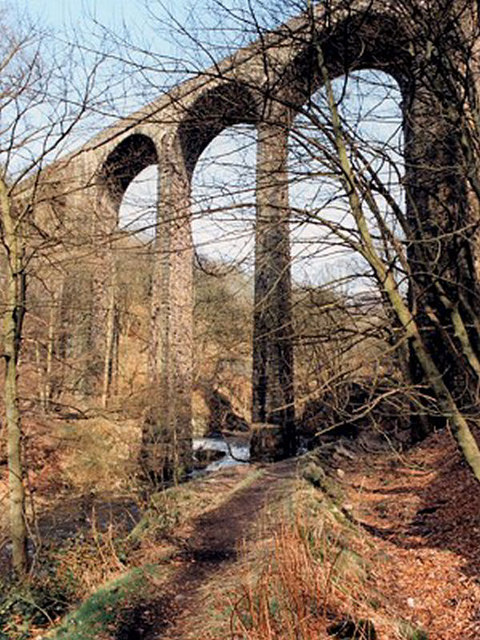
Healey Dell Viaduct

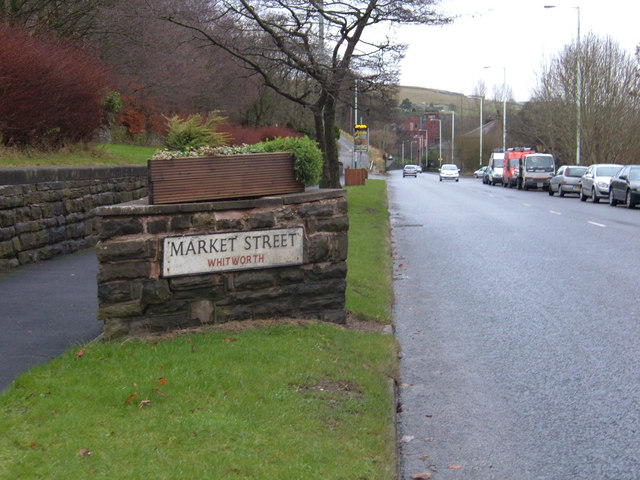
Market Street, Whitworth

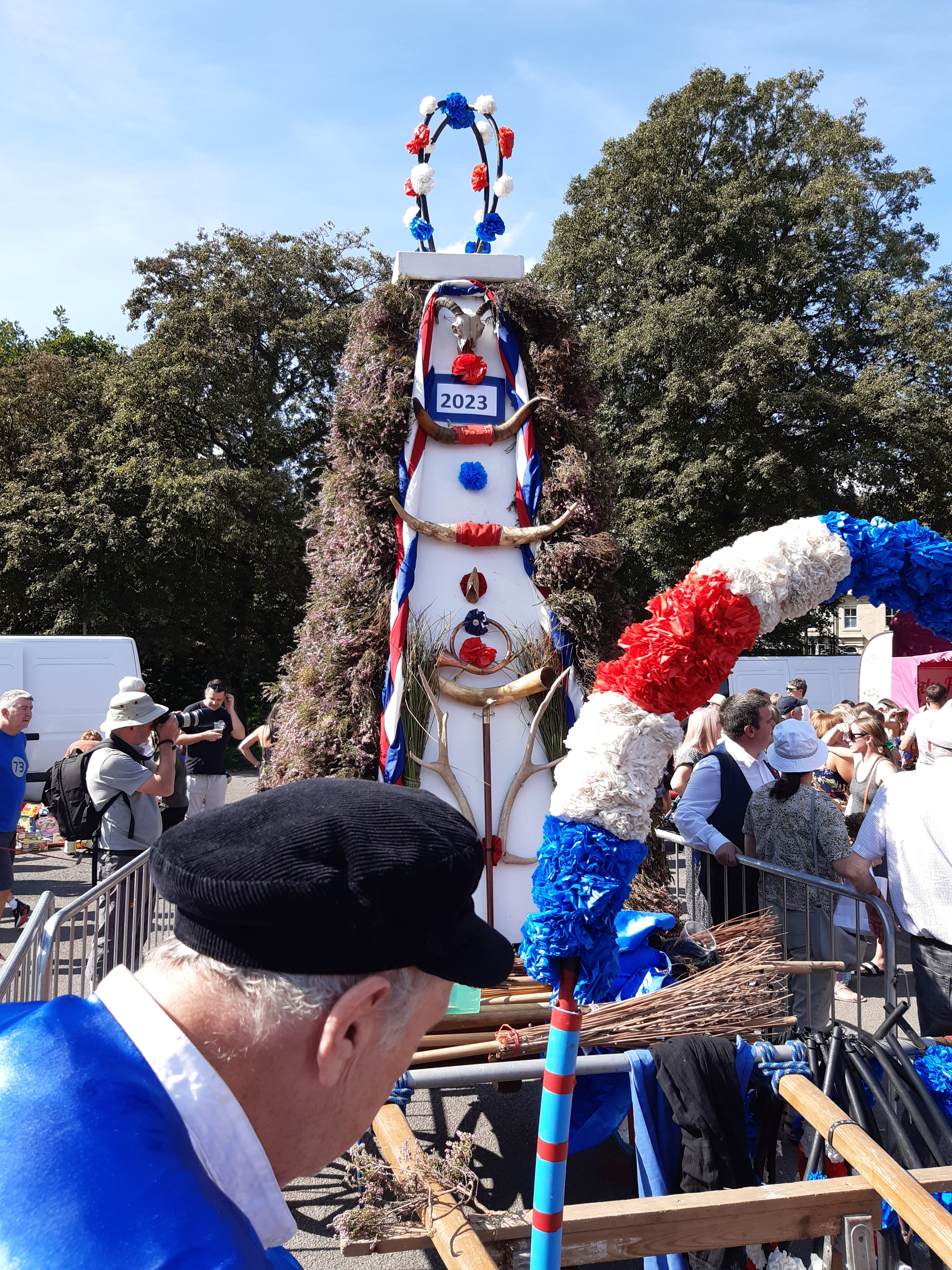
The annual Rushcart celebration, 2023

== See also ==
- Listed buildings in Whitworth, Lancashire
