= Bacup railway station =

Former railway station in Lancashire, England

Bacup
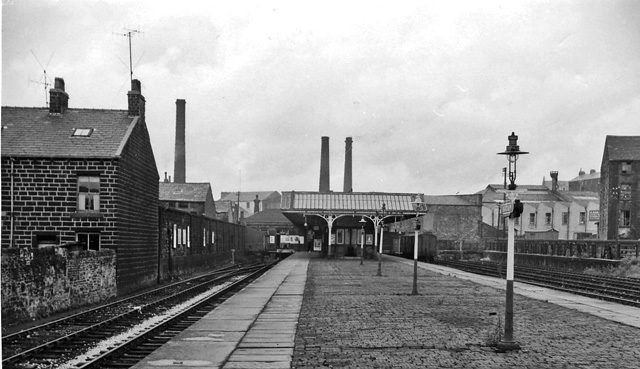
- The station in 1962

General information
- Location: Bacup, Rossendale; England
- Coordinates: 53.69780°N 2.20104°W
- Grid reference: SD868223
- Platforms: 2

Other information
- Status: Disused

History
- Original company: East Lancashire Railway
- Pre-grouping: Lancashire and Yorkshire Railway
- Post-grouping: London Midland and Scottish Railway

Key dates
- 1 October 1852: Station opened
- 5 December 1966: Station closed
Location

Bacup railway station served the town of Bacup, in Rossendale, Lancashire, England, from 1852 until its closure in 1966. It was the terminus of two lines: one from Rawtenstall and the other from Rochdale.

== History ==
Opened by the East Lancashire Railway, it was taken over by the Lancashire and Yorkshire Railway in 1859. It became part of the London, Midland and Scottish Railway during the Grouping of 1923.

The LMS closed the line from Rochdale in June 1947, shortly before the station passed on to the London Midland Region of British Railways on nationalisation in 1948.

It was closed by the British Railways Board, as a result of the Beeching cuts of the mid-1960s. The line was cut back to Rawtenstall in 1966. Until the very day of closure, trains ran every half an hour on weekdays and every fifteen minutes on Saturdays.

Preceding station	Disused railways	Following station
Stacksteads	Lancashire and Yorkshire Railway; Rawtenstall to Bacup Line	Terminus
Britannia	Lancashire and Yorkshire Railway; Rochdale to Bacup Line	Terminus

== The site today ==
Few traces of the station remain today, as the site has now been redeveloped as industrial units. Part of an original boundary wall is extant.
