= Healey, Greater Manchester =

Ward of Rochdale, Greater Manchester, England

Coordinates: 53.6396°N 2.173°W

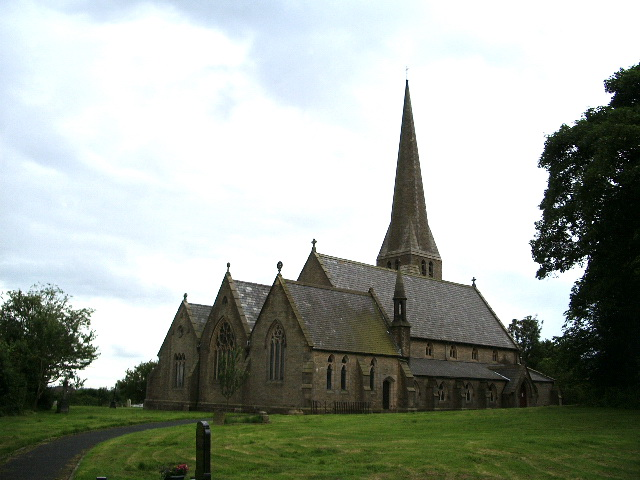
Christ Church, the Church of England parish church of Healey, built in 1849–50

Healey is part of the Metropolitan Borough of Rochdale, Greater Manchester, England. Historically part of Lancashire, it includes Shawclough, Syke and Nook Farm and the rest of the land known as Healey on the right side of Whitworth Road (A671) after Gale Street up to Healey Corner (Whitworth/Rochdale boundary). The population of this Rochdale ward at the 2011 census was 10,411.
