= Rochdale–Bacup line =

Former railway line in Lancashire, England

The Rochdale–Bacup line was a branch railway line which ran between Rochdale in Lancashire and Bacup in Lancashire via seven intermediate stops, Wardleworth, Shawclough and Healey, Broadley, Whitworth, Facit, Shawforth, and Britannia.

== History ==
=== Opening ===
It opened in two stages, from Rochdale to Facit in 1870, and from Facit to Bacup in 1881.

=== Closure ===
Passenger trains were withdrawn from the line in 1947, although the section from Rochdale to Facit remained open to goods trains until 1963 and to Whitworth until 1967.

== See also ==
- Roch Valley Viaduct
