= Rawtenstall to Bacup Line =

Railway line in England

The Rawtenstall to Bacup railway line opened in two stages, from Rawtenstall to Waterfoot in 1848, and from Waterfoot to the Bacup terminus in 1852. There were stations at Rawtenstall, Cloughfold, Stacksteads and Bacup. The line was doubled in 1880, at the same time as the line from Bacup to Rochdale was also opened (closed 1947). Passenger and freight services operated until the Beeching cuts in 1966, the last passenger train running on 5 December 1966 and the track being lifted in 1969.

As the Irwell Valley is quite narrow the line had many engineering features in its 5-mile (8.0 km) length, including 14 crossings of the River Irwell alone, plus many over and underbridges, embankments and cuttings, and tunnels at Thrutch Gorge (The Glen) in Waterfoot. Most of the bridges have been demolished or infilled in the years since closure. A foot and cycle path now follows much of the route including the 1/8-mile (200 m) Newchurch No. 1 Tunnel and 1/4-mile (400 m) Newchurch No 2 Tunnel.

However, there are proposals to reopen the line as part of the government's strategy to reopen old railway lines in the country which have been closed in the 1960s or later cuts under British Rail.
