= Shawclough =

Area of Rochdale, Greater Manchester, England

Coordinates: 53.629°N 2.173°W

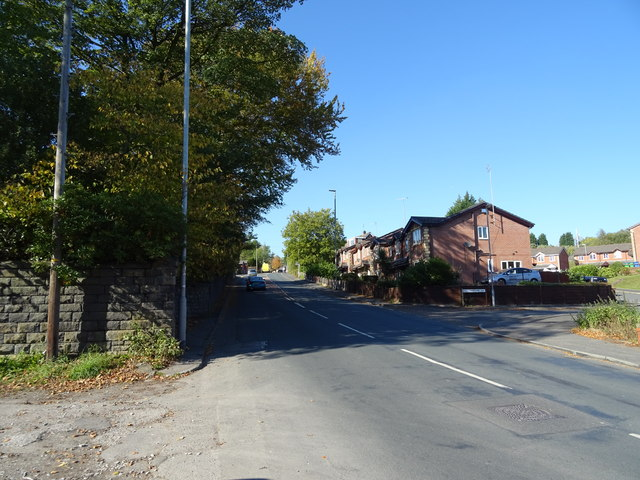
Shawclough Road

Shawclough is a mainly residential area north of Rochdale, Greater Manchester, England. Its boundaries are roughly Whitworth Road, Shawclough Road, and Healey Corner. Housing is mixed but predominantly owned semi-detached and detached 3–4 bedroom houses. House building over the past 30 years has significantly reduced green spaces, though Healey Dell and Falinge Park are notable areas within Shawclough. Industry in the area is low level, though, at one time, manufacturing did take place at the Turner Brothers Asbestos Company in the near vicinity. Shawclough is part of the Healey parish district of Rochdale. Shawclough is known for its local fisheries as-well as sports accommodations for younger and older folk alike.

== History ==
In the early 19th century, Shawclough Brook and Spodden Brook (tributaries of the River Spodden) were the location of several water-powered mills. These were part of the textile manufacturing process and included three fulling mills, a cotton mill and a dyeworks. The area was later served by a cotton-waste spinning mill, utilising tandem compound steam engines created by McNaught's in 1907 and Openshaw's M. E. Robinson in 1912.
