= List of railway stations in Greater Manchester =

Railways in Greater Manchester
Primary route
Secondary route
Rural route
Goods only
Heritage railway
Metrolink
Disused railway

Greater Manchester, a metropolitan county in North West England, has a public rail network of 130 route miles (209 km) and 92 National Rail stations.^{[a]} Transport for Greater Manchester is responsible for specifying fares and service levels of train services operating in the county. The Northern train operating company provides most of these services. The four main railway stations in Manchester city centre are Manchester Piccadilly, Manchester Victoria, Manchester Oxford Road and Manchester Deansgate which all form part of the Manchester station group.

Most services run to or through one of Manchester city centre's major stations, Manchester Victoria and Manchester Piccadilly. The network is effectively divided into two operating halves based on these stations, although the opening of a connecting line in 1988 improved operational flexibility by joining the north and south halves. This was further improved by the Ordsall Chord (opened to traffic on 10 December 2017), creating a direct link between Piccadilly and Victoria.

Services radiate northwards from Manchester Victoria, providing stopping services to West Yorkshire and Liverpool as well as local suburban services to Rochdale and Wigan. The south side's services radiate from Manchester Piccadilly and run to Manchester Airport, south Manchester, Cheshire, Staffordshire, Leeds, North East England, London and other major destinations.

The region's rail network started to develop during the Industrial Revolution, when it was at the centre of a textile manufacturing boom. Manchester was at the forefront of the railway building revolution during the Victorian era. The world's first passenger railway, the Liverpool and Manchester Railway, opened on 15 September 1830. Its original terminus, Liverpool Road railway station, was closed to passengers in 1844, but still exists and is the oldest surviving passenger station in the world. Since the Beeching cuts many of Greater Manchester's stations have closed and many station facilities have been removed. Others, however, have been converted to the Manchester Metrolink, Greater Manchester's light-rail network, or preserved as part of the East Lancashire Railway heritage route.^{[b]} The expansion of the Metrolink is set to continue at least through 2020, with the planned opening of the Trafford Park Line. In October 2009, nine stations on the former Oldham Loop Line closed for conversion, and future plans include the use of tram-trains to allow Metrolink to serve existing National Rail stations.

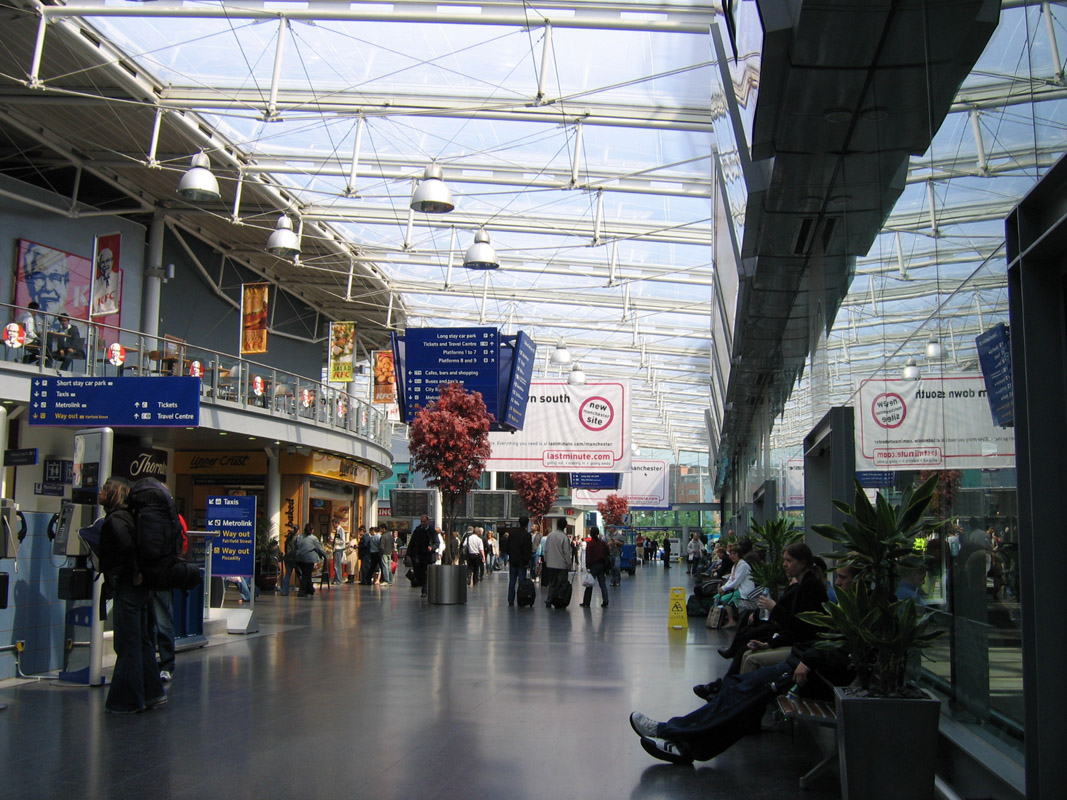
Manchester Piccadilly, the principal station for the City of Manchester and busiest station in Greater Manchester by number of passengers.

Heavy rail commuter line map

In preparation for the 2002 Commonwealth Games Manchester Piccadilly, the principal station for the City of Manchester, was extensively redeveloped and as a consequence has been voted as having the highest customer satisfaction rating of all the main stations in the United Kingdom. As of 2013, Manchester Victoria is under renovation with the construction of a new £20 million roof while Oxford Road will see redevelopment as a result of the Northern Hub plan in 2014. The construction of the Ordsall Chord linked Greater Manchester's three busiest stations for the first time in December 2017.

== Railway stations currently in use ==
Station (and code)	Borough	Managed by	Lines served	Year opened	DfT Category	Platforms	Station users 2018/19	Station users 2019/20	Station users 2020/21	Station users 2021/22
Altrincham (ALT)	Trafford	Northern	Mid-Cheshire Line	1881	C2	2 + 2 Metrolink^{[c]}	396,832	372,682	69,168	222,136
Ardwick (ADK)	Manchester	Northern	Glossop Line; Hope Valley Line	1842	F2	2	1,238	1,520	238	404
Ashburys (ABY)	Manchester	Northern	Glossop Line; Hope Valley Line	1846	F2	2	112,846	128,958	35,190	65,502
Ashton-under-Lyne (AHN)	Tameside	Northern	Huddersfield Line	1846	E	2	326,674	362,246	70,596	168,024
Atherton (ATN)	Wigan	Northern	Manchester to Southport Line	1888	E	2	288,906	329,668	65,272	179,860
Belle Vue (BLV)	Manchester	Northern	Hope Valley Line	1875	F2	2	6,820	8,624	2,602	8,644
Blackrod (BLK)	Bolton	Northern	Manchester to Preston Line	1841	F1	2	563,764	606,246	51,754	132,044
Bolton (BON)	Bolton	Northern	Manchester to Southport Line; Ribble Valley Line; Manchester to Preston Line; TransPennine North West; West Coast Main Line	1838	C1	5	3,074,022	3,262,460	865,704	2,344,116
Bramhall (BML)	Stockport	Northern	Stafford to Manchester Line	1845	E	2	326,008	311,620	38,604	138,206
Bredbury (BDY)	Stockport	Northern	Hope Valley Line	1875	E	2	232,302	239,204	48,242	141,336
Brinnington (BNT)	Stockport	Northern	Hope Valley Line	1977	E	2	98,004	109,278	32,852	78,476
Broadbottom (BDB)	Tameside	Northern	Glossop Line	1842	E	2	197,316	202,140	35,400	99,086
Bromley Cross (BMC)	Bolton	Northern	Ribble Valley Line	1848	E	2	328,540	412,582	73,988	211,250
Bryn (BYN)	Wigan	Northern	Liverpool to Wigan Line	1869	F1	2	160,748	172,300	33,044	85,596
Burnage (BNA)	Manchester	Northern	South TransPennine; Styal Line	1910	E	2	211,880	212,504	37,962	135,406
Castleton (CAS)	Rochdale	Northern	Caldervale Line	1875	F1	2	178,582	172,682	35,900	78,216
Chassen Road (CSR)	Trafford	Northern	Manchester to Liverpool Line	1934	E	2	53,530	57,780	6,216	26,166
Cheadle Hulme (CHU)	Stockport	Northern	Crewe to Manchester Line; Stafford to Manchester Line	1845*	D	4	963,034	908,988	139,174	489,564
Clifton (CLI)	Salford	Northern	Manchester to Preston Line	1847	F2	2	282	282	128	140
Daisy Hill (DSY)	Bolton	Northern	Manchester to Southport Line	1888	E	2	285,946	309,608	50,132	149,930
Davenport (DVN)	Stockport	Northern	Buxton Line; Hope Valley Line	1858	E	2	338,124	349,314	68,610	215,242
Deansgate (DGT)	Manchester	Northern	Liverpool to Manchester Lines; Manchester to Preston Line; Stafford to Manchester Line; TransPennine North West	1849	D	2 + 3 Metrolink	456,140	1,323,150	213,194	804,664
Denton (DTN)	Tameside	Northern	Stockport to Stalybridge Line	1851	F2	2	46	92	12	50
East Didsbury (EDY)	Manchester	Northern	South TransPennine; Styal Line	1909	E	2	282,102	295,542	46,424	184,964
Eccles (ECC)	Salford	Northern	Liverpool to Manchester Lines	1830	E	2	158,616	197,418	51,670	165,256
Fairfield (FRF)	Tameside	Northern	Hope Valley Line	1841	F2	2	41,296	43,316	3,906	14,026
Farnworth (FNW)	Bolton	Northern	Manchester to Preston Line	1838	E	2	46,380	59,228	17,610	43,744
Flixton (FLI)	Trafford	Northern	Liverpool to Manchester Lines	1873	E	2	144,338	146,174	25,754	75,970
Flowery Field (FLF)	Tameside	Northern	Glossop Line	1985	F2	2	274,162	253,172	66,500	162,868
Gathurst (GST)	Wigan	Northern	Manchester to Southport Line	1855	F1	2	94,320	106,722	14,426	71,014
Gatley (GTY)	Stockport	Northern	South TransPennine; Styal Line	1909	E	2	349,700	338,626	66,656	252,240
Godley (GDL)	Tameside	Northern	Glossop Line	1986	F2	2	107,450	107,788	23,142	63,618
Gorton (GTO)	Manchester	Northern	Glossop Line; Hope Valley Line	1842	E	2	122,648	126,092	24,368	51,966
Greenfield (GNF)	Oldham	Northern	Huddersfield Line	1849	E	2	398,628	432,830	84,746	278,922
Guide Bridge (GUI)	Tameside	Northern	Glossop Line; Hope Valley Line; Stockport to Stalybridge Line	1846	E	2	382,542	386,422	75,418	204,036
Hag Fold (HGF)	Wigan	Northern	Manchester-Southport Line	1987	E	2	44,888	48,138	15,112	46,894
Hale (HAL)	Trafford	Northern	Mid-Cheshire Line	1862	E	2	144,486	141,202	29,880	85,142
Hall i' th' Wood (HID)	Bolton	Northern	Ribble Valley Line	1986	F2	2	177,182	214,064	53,150	108,286
Hattersley (HTY)	Tameside	Northern	Glossop Line	1978	E	2	111,354	110,646	25,572	69,128
Hazel Grove (HAZ)	Stockport	Northern	Buxton Line; Hope Valley Line	1857	D	2	801,594	729,850	107,026	360,046
Heald Green (HDG)	Stockport	Northern	South TransPennine; Styal Line; TransPennine North West	1909	E	2	513,342	481,562	84,318	265,030
Heaton Chapel (HTC)	Stockport	Northern	Buxton Line; Crewe to Manchester Line; Stafford to Manchester Line	1852	E	2	849,320	827,926	123,484	412,582
Hindley (HIN)	Wigan	Northern	Manchester to Southport Line	1848	E	2	294,844	340,104	71,492	206,002
Horwich Parkway (HWI)	Bolton	Northern	Manchester to Preston Line	1999	F1	2	579,980	673,470	103,876	390,384
Humphrey Park (HUP)	Trafford	Northern	Liverpool to Manchester Lines	1984	F2	2	30,960	29,778	4,422	15,544
Hyde Central (HYC)	Tameside	Northern	Hope Valley Line	1858	F1	2	108,708	116,178	12,552	51,082
Hyde North (HYT)	Tameside	Northern	Hope Valley Line	1862	F2	2	48,836	53,358	7,608	20,220
Ince (INC)	Wigan	Northern	Manchester to Southport Line	1863	F2	2	20,856	27,928	9,618	19,712
Irlam (IRL)	Salford	Northern	Liverpool to Manchester Lines	1893	F1	2	358,312	359,522	81,978	215,386
Kearsley (KSL)	Bolton	Northern	Manchester to Preston Line	1838	F2	2	40,152	51,448	12,940	40,976
Levenshulme (LVM)	Manchester	Northern	Buxton Line; Crewe to Manchester Line; Stafford to Manchester Line	1843	E	2	530,462	541,642	140,462	383,738
Littleborough (LTL)	Rochdale	Northern	Caldervale Line	1839	F2	2	466,526	483,066	84,514	259,146
Lostock (LOT)	Bolton	Northern	Manchester to Preston Line	1988	E	2	237,272	279,570	47,064	143,826
Manchester Airport (MIA)	Manchester	TransPennine Express	North TransPennine; South TransPennine; Styal Line; TransPennine North West	1993	B	4 + 2 Metrolink	5,707,542	5,747,042	545,790	2,174,396
Manchester Oxford Road (MCO)	Manchester	Northern	Chester to Manchester Line; Liverpool to Manchester Lines; Manchester to Preston Line; North TransPennine; Stafford to Manchester Line; TransPennine North West	1849	C1	5	9,301,496	6,366,296	1,025,778	3,871,624
Manchester Piccadilly (MAN)	Manchester	Network Rail	Buxton Line; Chester to Manchester Line; Crewe to Manchester Line; CrossCountry; Glossop Line; Hope Valley Line; Liverpool to Manchester Lines; Manchester to Preston Line; Mid-Cheshire Line; North TransPennine; Stafford to Manchester Line; Styal Line; TransPennine North West; Welsh Marches Line; West Coast Main Line	1842	A	14 + 2 Metrolink	30,132,552	32,198,704	5,188,066	19,581,442
Manchester Victoria (MCV)	Manchester	Northern	Caldervale Line; Huddersfield Line; Manchester to Liverpool Line; Manchester to Preston Line; Manchester to Southport Line; Ribble Valley Line	1844	B	6 + 4 Metrolink	8,914,376	9,570,816	1,542,112	5,820,432
Marple (MPL)	Stockport	Northern	Hope Valley Line	1862	D	2	511,900	498,468	82,382	263,600
Mauldeth Road (MAU)	Manchester	Northern	South TransPennine; Styal Line	1909	D	2	349,738	305,762	68,552	203,392
Middlewood (MDL)	Stockport	Northern	Buxton Line	1879	F2	2	32,386	30,876	7,784	21,116
Mills Hill (MIH)	Rochdale	Northern	Caldervale Line	1985^{[d]}	F1	2	328,616	338,650	63,700	189,840
Moorside (MSD)	Salford	Northern	Manchester to Southport Line	1888	E	2	31,590	35,122	7,738	28,366
Moses Gate (MSS)	Bolton	Northern	Manchester to Preston Line	1838	F2	2	24,308	33,636	13,916	31,460
Mossley (MSL)	Tameside	Northern	Huddersfield Line	1849	E	2	336,906	327,738	76,552	237,100
Moston (MSO)	Manchester	Northern	Caldervale Line	1872	F2	2	70,464	88,612	27,374	54,432
Navigation Road (NVR)	Trafford	Northern	Mid-Cheshire Line	1931	F2	1^{[e]}	100,396	105,708	21,166	57,620
Newton for Hyde (NWN)	Tameside	Northern	Glossop Line	1841	E	2	219,478	210,344	47,768	112,776
Orrell (ORR)	Wigan	Northern	Kirkby Branch Line	1848	F1	2	92,888	96,894	20,324	73,454
Patricroft (PAT)	Salford	Northern	Liverpool to Manchester Lines	1830	F2	2	106,996	117,362	26,236	85,766
Pemberton (PEM)	Wigan	Northern	Kirkby Branch Line	1848	F2	2	72,028	68,988	14,802	40,790
Reddish North (RDN)	Stockport	Northern	Hope Valley Line	1875	E	2	226,612	242,326	55,858	144,782
Reddish South (RDS)	Stockport	Northern	Stockport to Stalybridge Line	1859	F2	1	60	158	18	108
Rochdale (RCD)	Rochdale	Northern	Caldervale Line	1839	C2	3 + 2 Metrolink	1,487,760	1,575,222	392,114	1,157,474
Romiley (RML)	Stockport	Northern	Hope Valley Line	1862	E	2	382,384	394,352	70,290	206,562
Rose Hill Marple (RSH)	Stockport	Northern	Hope Valley Line	1869	E	1	210,904	215,270	26,124	83,720
Ryder Brow (RRB)	Manchester	Northern	Hope Valley Line	1985	F2	2	31,368	32,794	7,638	16,476
Salford Central (SFD)	Salford	Northern	Manchester to Preston Line; Manchester to Southport Line; Ribble Valley Line	1838	E	2	772,844	1,028,446	136,876	463,572
Salford Crescent (SLD)	Salford	Northern	Manchester to Preston Line; Manchester to Southport Line; Ribble Valley Line; TransPennine North West	1987	C2	2	1,288,058	1,441,774	319,928	955,736
Smithy Bridge (SMB)	Rochdale	Northern	Caldervale Line	1985	F1	2	197,834	205,222	50,430	123,874
Stalybridge (SYB)	Tameside	TransPennine Express	Huddersfield Line; North TransPennine; Stockport to Stalybridge Line	1845	D	5	1,244,122	1,219,638	264,148	666,170
Stockport (SPT)	Stockport	Avanti West Coast	Buxton Line; Crewe to Manchester Line; CrossCountry; Hope Valley Line; Mid-Cheshire Line; South TransPennine; Stafford to Manchester Line; Stockport to Stalybridge Line; West Coast Main Line	1843	B	6	4,437,070	4,305,068	913,096	2,786,214
Strines (SRN)	Stockport	Northern	Hope Valley Line	1866	F2	2	27,710	22,186	3,720	14,972
Swinton (SNN)	Salford	Northern	Manchester to Southport Line	1887	E	2	125,480	142,280	37,350	115,494
Trafford Park (TRA)	Trafford	Northern	Liverpool to Manchester Lines	1904	F1	2	46,340	49,220	9,826	31,320
Urmston (URM)	Trafford	Northern	Liverpool to Manchester Lines	1873	E	2	409,472	413,118	81,628	255,456
Walkden (WKD)	Salford	Northern	Manchester to Southport Line	1888	E	2	301,570	374,288	70,630	216,630
Westhoughton (WHG)	Bolton	Northern	Manchester to Southport Line	1848	F1	2	176,386	199,434	55,874	164,848
Wigan North Western (WGN)	Wigan	Avanti West Coast	Blackpool to Liverpool Line; Liverpool to Wigan Line; West Coast Main Line	1838	B	6	1,683,184	1,604,012	386,422	1,168,204
Wigan Wallgate (WGW)	Wigan	Northern	Kirkby Branch Line; Manchester to Southport Line	1896	D	3	1,551,286	1,478,316	356,140	1,076,662
Woodley (WLY)	Stockport	Northern	Hope Valley Line	1862	F2	2	78,852	87,502	10,082	40,892
Woodsmoor (WSR)	Stockport	Northern	Buxton Line; Hope Valley Line	1990	E	2	310,608	302,204	64,220	169,262

== See also ==
- List of closed railway stations in Greater Manchester
- Transport in Manchester

== Footnotes ==
^{a} The total of 98 given at www.gmpte.com excludes Reddish South and Denton, which have one service per week, but includes Dean Lane, Failsworth, Hollinwood, Oldham Werneth, Oldham Mumps, Derker, Shaw and Crompton, New Hey and Milnrow, which closed on 3 October 2009.
^{b} Of the stations on the East Lancashire Railway operational as of the 2015 season, three (Bury Bolton Street, Heywood and Summerseat) are located within Greater Manchester.
^{c} Two other platforms are used by Manchester Metrolink services.
^{d} Originally opened in 1839 and closed in 1842. Reopened 25 March 1985 on the same site.
^{e} One other platform is used by Metrolink services.
