= Swinton railway station (Greater Manchester) =

Railway station in Greater Manchester, England

Coordinates: 53.5148°N 2.3367°W

Swinton
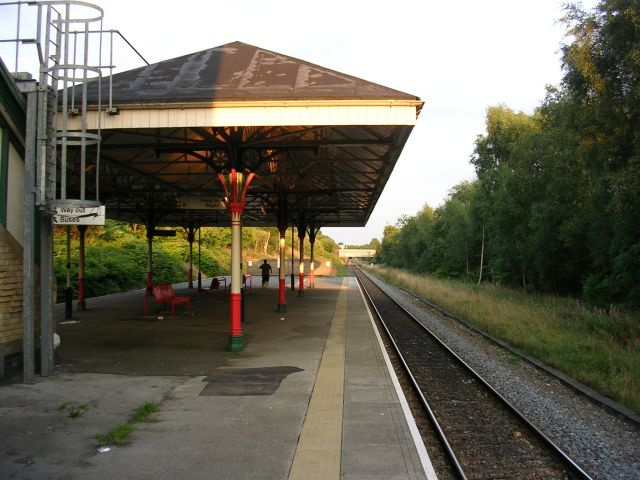

General information
- Location: Swinton, Salford; England
- Grid reference: SD777020
- Managed by: Northern Trains
- Transit authority: Greater Manchester
- Platforms: 2

Other information
- Station code: SNN
- Classification: DfT category E

History
- Opened: 13 June 1887

Passengers
- 2020/21: ▼37,350
- 2021/22: ▲0.115 million
- 2022/23: ▲0.129 million
- 2023/24: ▲0.154 million
- 2024/25: ▲0.165 million
Location
Notes
- Passenger statistics from the Office of Rail and Road

Swinton railway station serves the towns of Swinton and Pendlebury in the City of Salford, Greater Manchester, England. It is actually located in Pendlebury and not Swinton itself; the boundary between the two districts is about 40 yards further down Station Road (B5231), beyond the junction with Boundary Road and nearer the town centre. It opened, along with the line to passenger trains, in June 1887.

Swinton is on the Manchester to Southport Line. The station is located 5 miles 4 chains (8.1 km) north-west of Manchester Victoria, There are regular Northern Trains services to destinations such as Wigan North Western, Wigan Wallgate, Kirkby, Blackburn and Leeds; these services stop at local towns such as Salford, Atherton and Hindley. Onward trains take passengers on to Southport, although occasional services are direct.

Although the station is in the City of Salford, rather than Manchester, the name Swinton (Manchester) is used by National Rail to refer to the station; this is to avoid confusion with Swinton railway station in South Yorkshire.

== Facilities ==
Swinton station has relatively basic facilities. For example, the ticket office is only open until 12:50 on weekdays and 13:50 on Saturdays; it is closed on Sundays. When closed, one must purchase tickets on board the train or on-line. A screen in the booking hall lists live departure times of the trains showing any delays or cancellations; screens are also now installed in the centre of the island platform, showing live train departure information to commuters waiting on the platforms.

An intercom unit is also installed on the platform which passengers can use in the event of an emergency or if they need help or information when the station is unstaffed. As the ticket office is at street level on the bridge above, and is connected to the platforms via a staircase, no step-free access is available for wheelchair or mobility-impaired users.

== Service ==
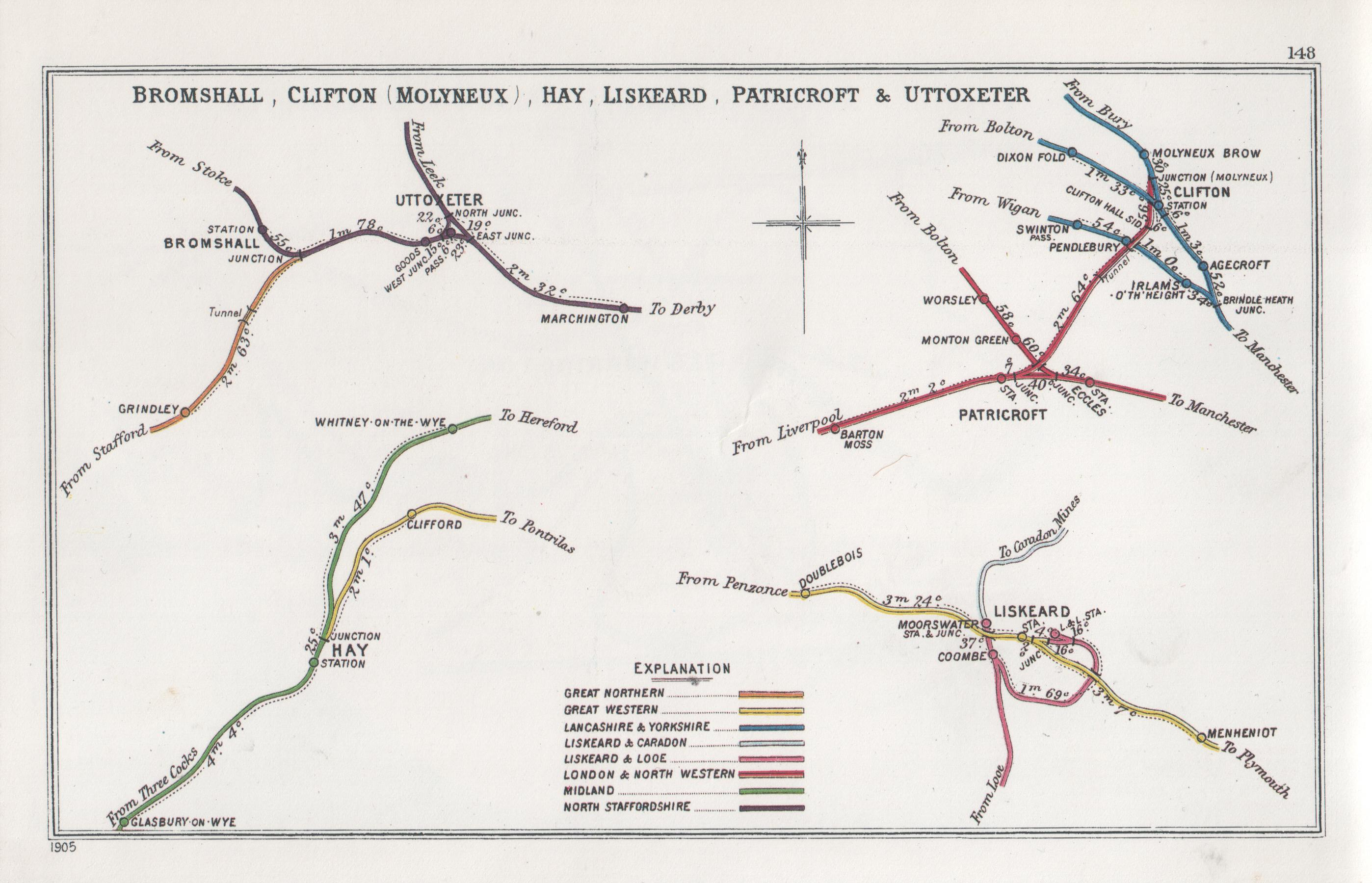
A 1905 Railway Clearing House Junction Diagram showing (upper right) railways in the vicinity of Swinton

Monday to Saturday daytimes, two trains per hour go eastbound towards Manchester Victoria and two per hour towards Wigan, both to Wigan Wallgate with one per hour extending to Kirkby westbound.

Most Manchester trains continue through to Todmorden and Blackburn or Leeds via the Caldervale Line. Passengers for stations to Southport need to change at Wigan, as only a limited number run through on weekdays since the May 2019 timetable change.

The evening service is similar, though there are no trains to Kirkby after 19:00 and services mostly terminate at Wigan Wallgate with one late service terminating at Wigan North Western. On Sundays there is one per hour each way to Manchester Victoria and Blackburn and to Southport.

A normal service operates on most bank holidays.

== Reinstatement of Sunday service ==
During much of the 1970s, 1980s, 1990s and 2000s, there were no Sunday services serving Swinton. After several years of successful lobbying from passenger user groups and station friends' groups, Northern Rail introduced a 12-month trial Sunday service beginning on 23 May 2010 with the funding support from Greater Manchester Passenger Transport Executive.

The service still continues to operate in the spring 2021 timetable and is included in the new Northern franchise agreement that came into effect in April 2016.

Preceding station	National Rail	Following station
Walkden or Moorside	Northern Trains; Manchester-Headbolt Lane; Manchester-Southport Line	Salford Crescent
	Historical railways	
Moorside; Line and station open	Lancashire & Yorkshire Railway	Pendlebury; Line open, station closed
