= Ince railway station =

Railway station in Greater Manchester, England

Coordinates: 53.5391°N 2.6126°W

Ince
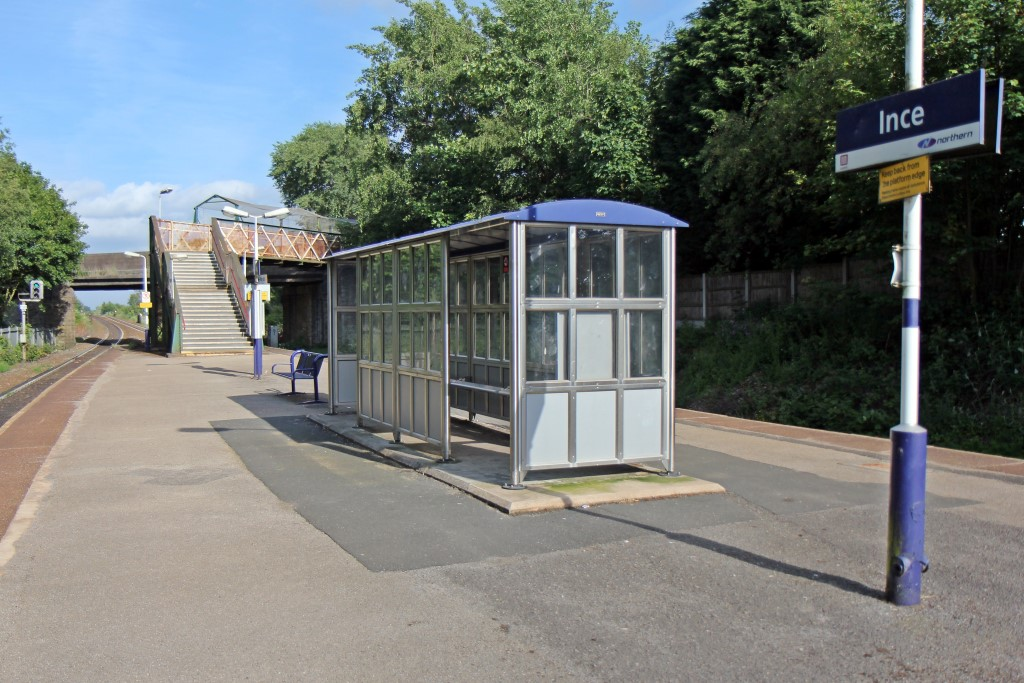
- Ince railway station in 2015

General information
- Location: Ince-in-Makerfield, Wigan; England
- Grid reference: SD595048
- Manager: Northern
- Transit authority: Greater Manchester
- Platforms: 2

Other information
- Station code: INC
- Classification: DfT category F2

History
- Original company: Lancashire and Yorkshire Railway
- Pre-grouping: Lancashire and Yorkshire Railway
- Post-grouping: London, Midland and Scottish Railway

Key dates
- 1888: Opened as Higher Ince

Passengers
- 2021/22: ▲19,712
- 2022/23: ▲23,720
- 2023/24: ▲35,498
- 2024/25: ▼12,836
- 2025/26: ▲62,426
Location
Notes
- Passenger statistics from the Office of Rail and Road

Ince railway station serves the Ince area of Metropolitan Borough of Wigan, Greater Manchester. The station is on the Manchester-Southport Line 15 miles (24 km) north west of Manchester Victoria.

Until November 1964, Ince was also served by a station at Lower Ince on the line from Wigan Central to Glazebrook (to the now closed Manchester Central).

== History ==
Ince suffered in the 1960s and 1970s from much house clearance and landscaping. This has resulted in low passenger usage for the station which served an area which was (until the 1960s) a bustling independent town. Ince (unlike Daisy Hill and Hindley, and other stations on the line) is not a commuter dormitory suburb and now the station is deserted even at peak times. Usage figures increased by around 10% in 2006/07 and recently by greater amounts (around 25% in 2007/08, and 29% in 2010-11) albeit from a relatively low base.

== Facilities ==
There are three seats, with a new shelter that contains benches. There is also a newly installed LED next train indicator sign (which the station did not previously have) and a payphone. A series of improvement works during June and July 2018 to the station added an array of CCTV cameras and a new Card-Only ticket machine. The station is entirely unstaffed and customers must obtain tickets from the ticket machine on the platform. those wishing to pay for their ticket with cash must use the ticket machine to obtain a 'Promise to Pay' and pay the conductor on the train.

== Services ==
The station was served by an hourly service in each direction to Manchester Victoria via Atherton and to Wigan Wallgate respectively until the Spring 2025 timetable change. Since then (and following the completion of the modernisation work associated with the electrification of the line to Bolton), the service has improved significantly, with an additional two trains per hour each way on the Manchester - Bolton - Southport calling here. One eastbound service each hour (via Atherton) continues through to Todmorden, Dewsbury and Leeds.

There is an hourly daytime Sunday service to Wigan, Southport and Manchester Victoria (via Atherton) in the current (Spring 2025) timetable. Eastbound services continue to Rochdale and Blackburn.

== Electrification ==
The line between Wigan and Bolton has been given government approval to be electrified and upgraded. Various bridges were modified and rebuilt to make way for this. Ince station will thus have electrification hardware in the future. In 2024, the railway station became part of the £100 million electrification project, and was temporarily closed for approximately five months while upgrades took place.

== Notes ==
Preceding station	National Rail	Following station
Wigan Wallgate	Northern Trains Headbolt Lane - Blackburn (Monday-Saturday)	Hindley
Wigan Wallgate	Northern Trains Southport - Blackburn (Sundays)	Hindley
Wigan Wallgate	Northern Trains Southport - Manchester Oxford Road (Limited service)	Hindley
Wigan North Western	Northern Trains Wigan North Western - Manchester Victoria / Leeds (Limited service)	Hindley
