= Walkden railway station =

Railway station in Greater Manchester, England

Coordinates: 53.5197°N 2.3960°W

Walkden
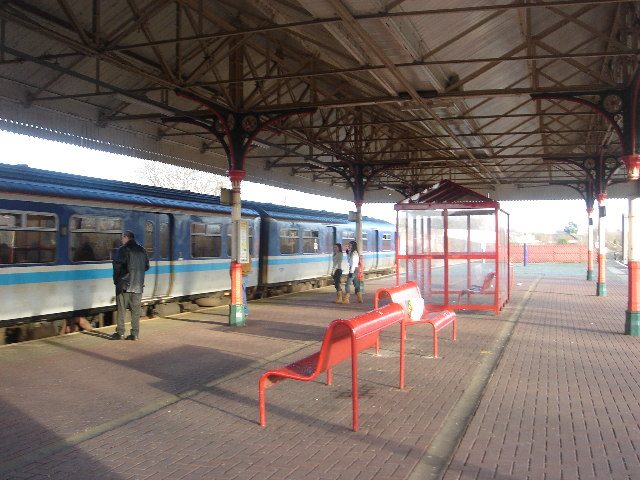

General information
- Location: Walkden, Salford; England
- Grid reference: SD738026
- Managed by: Northern Trains
- Transit authority: Greater Manchester
- Platforms: 2

Other information
- Station code: WKD
- Classification: DfT category E

Key dates
- 1888: Opened

Passengers
- 2020/21: ▼70,630
- 2021/22: ▲0.217 million
- 2022/23: ▲0.242 million
- 2023/24: ▲0.275 million
- 2024/25: ▲0.301 million
Location
Notes
- Passenger statistics from the Office of Rail and Road

Walkden railway station serves the town of Walkden in City of Salford, Greater Manchester, England on the Manchester to Southport Line. The station is located 8 1/4 miles (13.3 km) north-west of Manchester with regular Northern Trains services to these towns as well as the city of Salford, Swinton and Hindley. It was opened by the Lancashire and Yorkshire Railway.

One of the busier stations on the line, the station used to be known as Walkden High Level to differentiate it from the London and North Western Railway's Walkden Low Level railway station (on the line from Manchester Exchange to Bolton Great Moor Street, which was closed to passengers in 1954). It controlled a junction for the goods line to Ellesmere Colliery.

First opened in 1888 with the line, it has only ever had two platform faces - when the line was quadrupled at the turn of the century, the two additional tracks were laid to the south and were not provided with platforms. The fast lines were subsequently decommissioned in November 1965 and lifted.

In February 2007 the Friends of Walkden Station community volunteer group was founded to campaign for improvements to the station's facilities and services.

One of the line's two remaining signal boxes was formerly located here (it acted as the 'fringe' box to Manchester Piccadilly signalling centre), but it and neighbouring Atherton Goods Yard box were both closed in the spring of 2013 and their semaphore signals replaced by colour lights worked from Piccadilly SCC.

== Facilities ==
The station has a staffed ticket office, though this is only staffed part-time (06:10 to 12:40 weekdays, 07:10 to 13:40 Saturdays, closed Sundays). A ticket machine is also available. Train running information is provided by digital display screens, automated announcements and timetable posters. No step-free access is possible, as the station is above street level and is reached via two flights of stairs.

On 11 March 2020, The Chancellor of The Exchequer announced that Walkden Station would be one of 12 stations to receive Access for All funding from Network Rail, in order to develop step-free access to the station.

In April 2023, a Park and Ride facility for 107 cars was opened by Salford City Council. The site also includes a bike storage shed for 32 bikes, electric charging stations for electric vehicles and motorcycle bays.

== Service ==
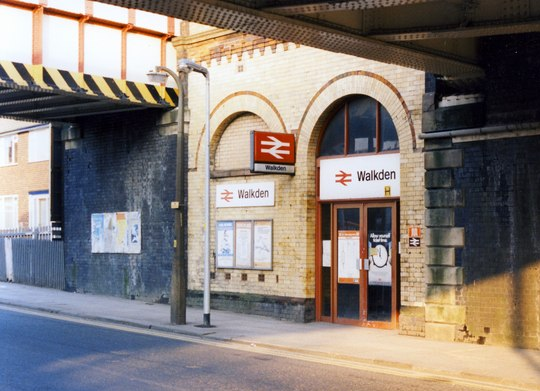
The entrance to Walkden railway station

Monday to Saturday daytimes, two trains per hour go eastbound to Manchester Victoria and two per hour towards Wigan - both trains continue to Wigan Wallgate westbound and one continues to Headbolt Lane (down from three each way prior to the pandemic). Only one train per day (weekdays and Saturdays) continues to Southport since the summer 2019 timetable change. All Sunday services continue to Southport.

Most Manchester departures continue along the Caldervale Line to Todmorden, Burnley Manchester Road and Blackburn or to Leeds via Brighouse.

On 18 December 2009 the Greater Manchester Passenger Transport Executive (GMPTE) voted to approve funding for a one-year trial of Sunday trains from Walkden, starting on 23 May 2010. This proved successful and now runs twice per hour in each direction (one Blackburn to Southport train and a second between Wigan and Manchester Victoria).

Preceding station	National Rail	Following station
Atherton	Northern Trains; Manchester-Southport Line or Manchester-Headbolt Lane	Swinton or Moorside
