= Walsden railway station =

Railway station in West Yorkshire, England

Walsden
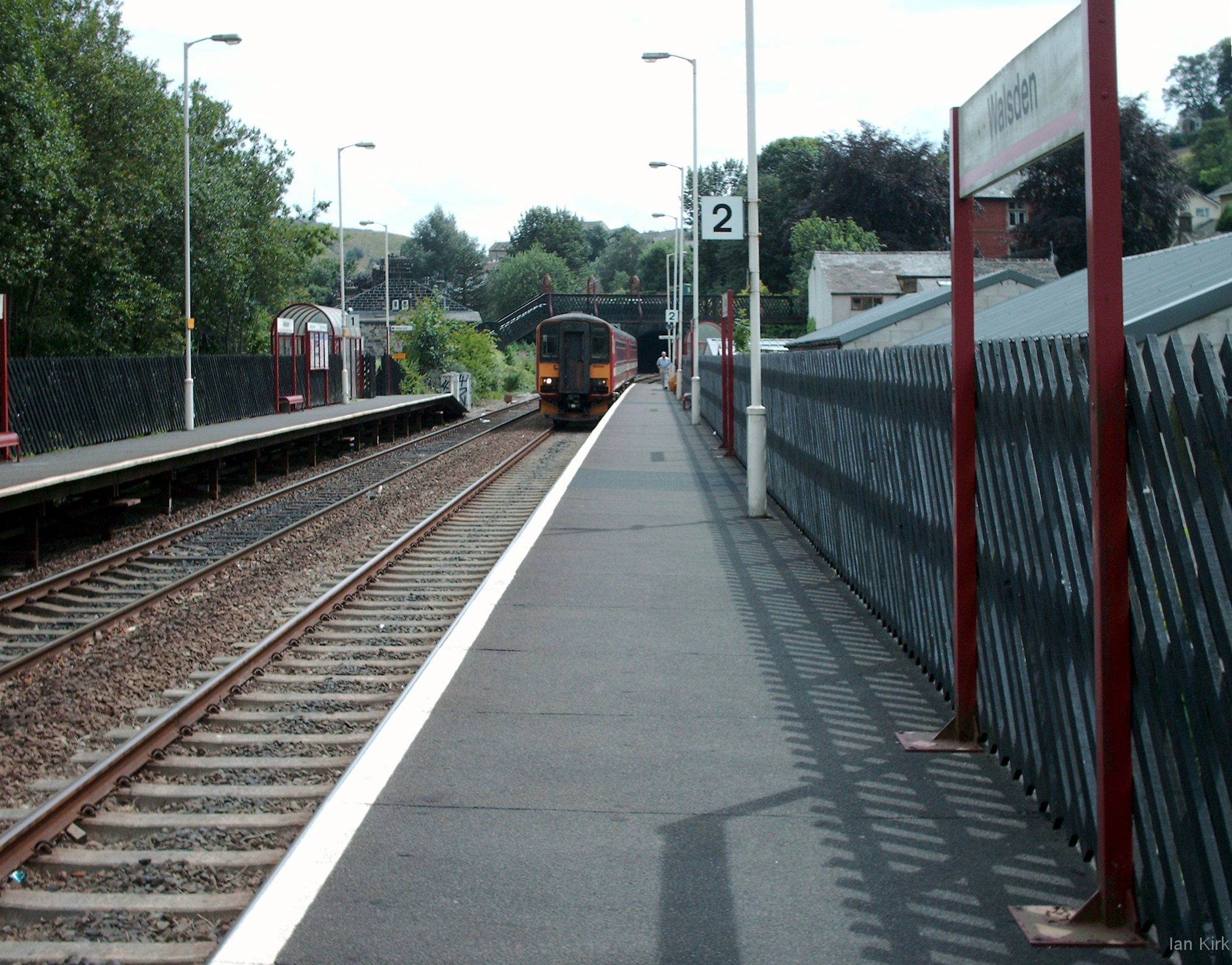
- The view from platform 2

General information
- Location: Walsden, Todmorden, Calderdale; England
- Coordinates: 53.696340°N 2.104670°W
- Grid reference: SD931222
- Managed by: Northern
- Transit authority: West Yorkshire (Metro)
- Platforms: 2

Other information
- Station code: WDN
- Fare zone: 5
- Classification: DfT category F2

History
- Opened: 1990

Passengers
- 2020/21: ▼26,512
- 2021/22: ▲64,848
- 2022/23: ▲65,586
- 2023/24: ▲72,024
- 2024/25: ▲80,466
Location
Notes
- Passenger statistics from the Office of Rail and Road

Walsden railway station (/ˈwɒlzdən/; WOLZ-dən) serves the village of Walsden, Todmorden in West Yorkshire, England, on the edge of the Pennines.

It is served by the Calder Valley line operated by Northern. The station is 32 miles (51 km) west of Leeds and 17.25 miles (28 km) north east of Manchester Victoria. Walsden is the last station before the boundary with Greater Manchester. The station was opened by Metro (West Yorkshire Passenger Transport Executive) on 10 September 1990 as a replacement for an earlier structure that closed on 6 August 1961. This earlier station, which was opened in 1845 by the Manchester & Leeds Railway, predecessor of the Lancashire & Yorkshire Railway, was situated between the level crossing and the north portal of Winterbutlee Tunnel, a few yards south of the present station.

== Facilities ==
The station is unstaffed and has only basic facilities (no permanent buildings, just shelters on each platform). Ticket vending machines are provided to allow passengers to purchase these prior to travel, whilst digital information screens and timetable posters supply train running information. The station is fully accessible, with ramps to each platform for wheelchair and mobility impaired users.

== Services ==
There is an hourly service (Mondays to Fridays) to Manchester Victoria and Wigan Wallgate southbound and to Leeds via Dewsbury northbound (since the May 2014 timetable change) with extra trains during peak times in each direction (including some trains to Burnley and Blackburn). Passengers wishing to access destinations on the route via Halifax during the day now have to change at Todmorden or Hebden Bridge.

In the evenings, the frequency remains hourly but trains run via Halifax. Sundays see the station served hourly by the Blackburn to Manchester and Southport trains.

== History ==
The station has had problems with flooding for many years, with the most recent bout occurring on 26 December 2015. The line was blocked the following day, but reopened to traffic on 28 December. Further heavy rain in November 2019 also caused the line to be closed for 24 hours because of high water levels at a river bridge just to the west of the station.

Preceding station	National Rail	Following station
Littleborough	Northern; Caldervale Line	Todmorden
