= Manchester–Southport line =

Railway line in England

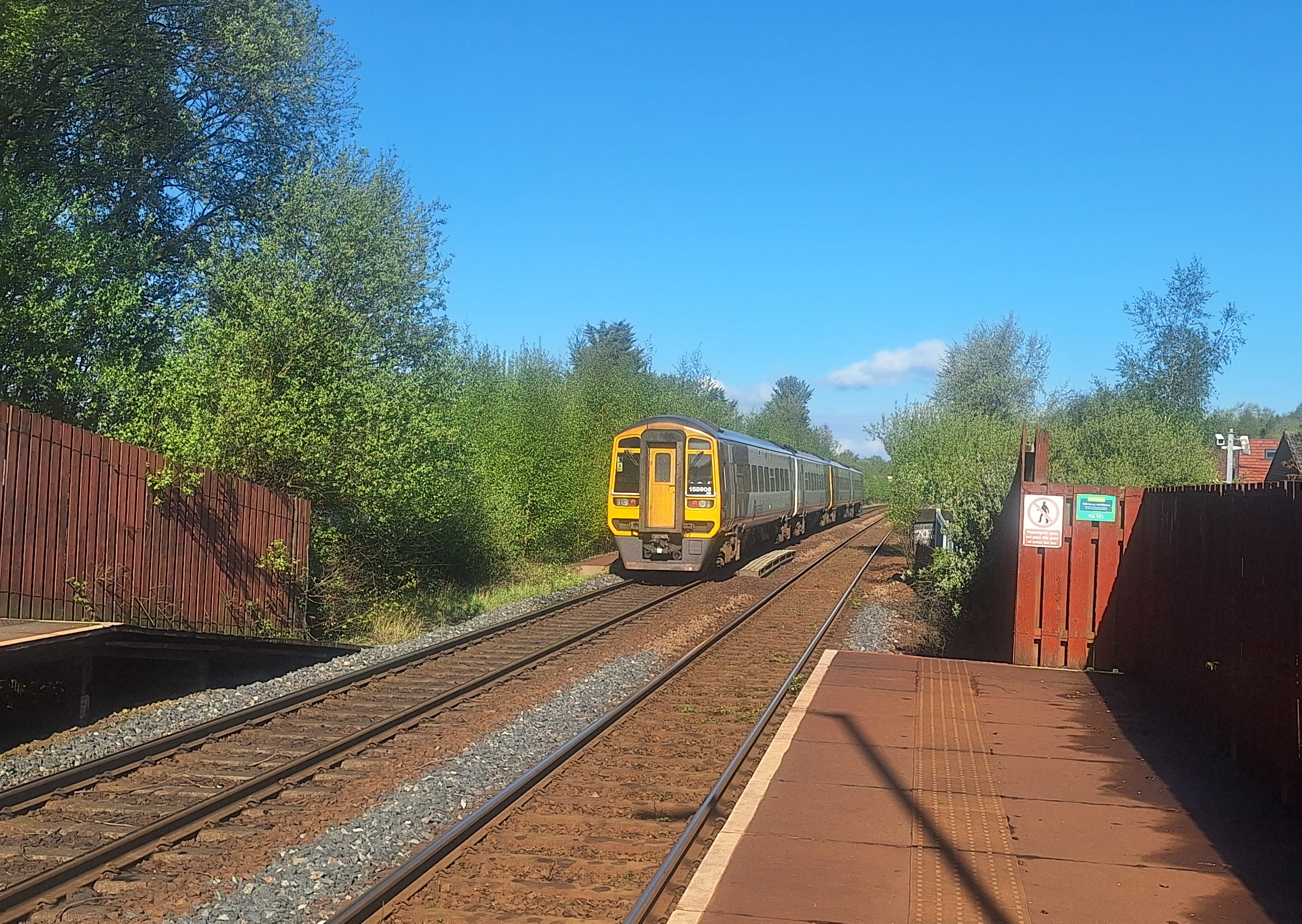
- A Northern Class 158 departing Hag Fold railway station

Overview
- Status: Operational
- Owner: Network Rail
- Locale: Greater Manchester; Lancashire; Merseyside; North West England

Service
- System: National Rail
- Operator(s): Northern Trains

History
- Opened: 1855/1888

Technical
- Line length: 35.75 miles
- Track gauge: 4 ft 8 1/2 in (1,435 mm) standard gauge
Route map
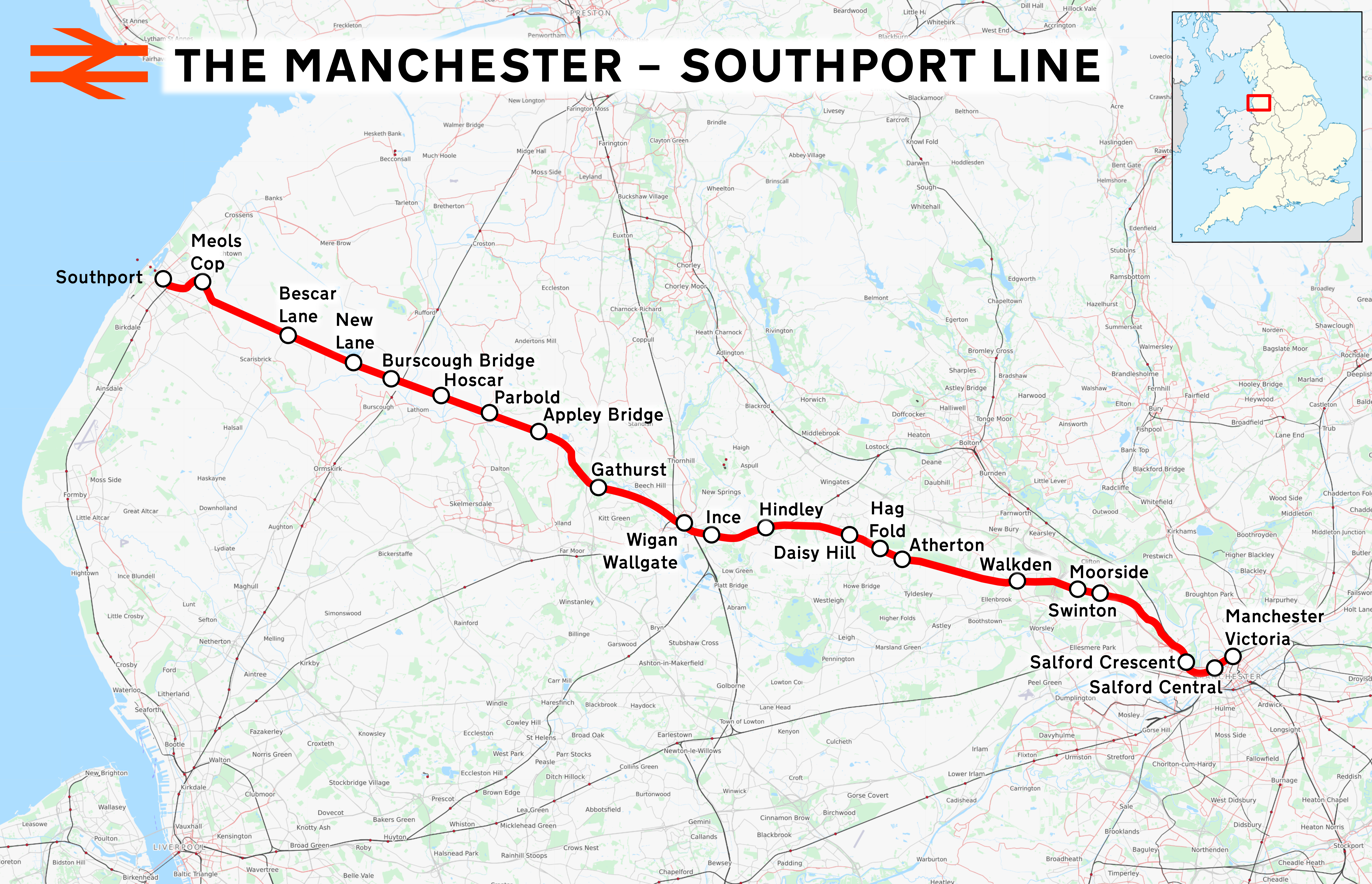
(Click to expand)

The Manchester–Southport line is a railway line in the north-west of England, operated by Northern Trains. It was originally built as the Manchester and Southport Railway. The section between Wigan and Salford is also known locally as the Atherton Line.

Starting at the city centre stations of Manchester Victoria (also serving Salford Central on the fringe of the city centre) and Manchester Piccadilly (also serving Manchester Oxford Road and Deansgate), it runs in a north-western direction through the towns, villages and suburbs of the City of Salford and Wigan. It then proceeds in the same direction through the small rural villages of West Lancashire, before ending on the Irish Sea coast at the resort town of Southport.

== Rolling stock ==
Services on the line use Class 150, Class 156 and Class 158 DMUs as well as Class 769 BMUs, although 150s and 156s are the most common. Class 153 DMUs are banned from operating on this route because the steps below the doors on these units foul the platform coping stones at Wigan Wallgate station.

== Current stations ==
- Southport – terminus, interchange for Merseyrail Northern line services to south Sefton and Liverpool
- Meols Cop – suburban stop for eastern Southport
- Bescar Lane – village (cottage-style) stop for North Meols. Infrequent service.
- New Lane – village stop, also for Martin Mere. Infrequent service.
- Burscough Bridge – town stop, pedestrian interchange to Burscough Junction on Preston to Ormskirk branch line. Now an unstaffed station.
- Hoscar – village stop for Hoscar and Lathom. Infrequent service
- Parbold – for village of Parbold. Staffed station.
- Appley Bridge – suburban stop for Appley Bridge. Western boundary for TfGM ticketing zone
- Gathurst, serves the nearby village of Shevington
- Wigan Wallgate – main stop for town of Wigan, interchange for services to Kirkby, Bolton, Manchester Airport and Rochdale. Pedestrian interchange to Wigan North Western for national services to Birmingham, Glasgow, Liverpool, and London.
- Ince – suburban stop for Ince-in-Makerfield. Not served by semi-fast services.
- Hindley – suburban stop for Hindley. Interchange point for services to Bolton. Staffed station.
- Daisy Hill – Westhoughton and Leigh. Staffed station.
- Hag Fold – suburban stop for Atherton and Leigh. Staffed station. Not served by semi-fast services.
- Atherton – stop for town of Atherton and Leigh. Staffed station.
- Walkden – stop for Walkden and Worsley. Staffed station.
- Moorside – suburban stop. Staffed station. Not served by semi-fast services.
- Swinton – stop for town of Swinton. Staffed station.
- Salford Crescent – main stop for city of Salford and the University of Salford, interchange for services to Bolton and Preston line and Ribble Valley line services to Blackburn
- Salford Central – city centre stop serving the western fringes of Manchester city centre, the station lies just on the Manchester/Salford boundary, but Central Manchester is the area this station serves.
- Manchester Victoria – main stop for city of Manchester, and interchange for trans-pennine services and services to south Lancashire and Merseyside. Metrolink tram interchange to Manchester Piccadilly railway station for mainline intercity services.

== Tram train ==
There is ongoing feasibility into the conversion of parts of this line (Wigan–Atherton–Manchester) to operate as a Manchester Metrolink service with a higher frequency metro service for the Greater Manchester Boroughs of Wigan and Salford into the city centre. In November 2013, the Greater Manchester Combined Authority approved a recommended strategy for reconfiguring existing commuter services into tram-train operation, identifying the Atherton line as providing an opportunity for extending potential tram-train services from the south-east (Marple, Glossop) across the city centre and outwards to the north west. Southport and Kirkby services on this line would be diverted to operate via Bolton. Additionally, Network Rail has identified electrification of Wigan to Southport, together with the Ormskirk–Preston line and the Burscough Curves as a possible source of new services.
