= Atherton railway station =

Railway station in Greater Manchester, England

Atherton
- Atherton railway station in 2026

General information
- Location: Atherton, Wigan; England
- Coordinates: 53.529°N 2.479°W
- Grid reference: SD684037
- Manager: Northern Trains
- Transit authority: Greater Manchester
- Platforms: 2

Other information
- Station code: ATN
- Classification: DfT category E

Key dates
- 1 July 1888: Opened as Atherton Central
- 1954: Renamed Atherton

Passengers
- 2020/21: ▼65,272
- 2021/22: ▲0.180 million
- 2022/23: ▲0.193 million
- 2023/24: ▲0.205 million
- 2024/25: ▲0.218 million
Location
Notes
- Passenger statistics from the Office of Rail and Road

Atherton railway station (formerly Atherton Central) serves the town of Atherton, Greater Manchester, England. It lies on the line between Wigan and Manchester on the Manchester to Southport Line; according to Office of Rail and Road figures, it is the third busiest station on the line after Manchester Victoria and Wigan Wallgate.

The station is located 10 mi (16 km) north-west of Manchester Victoria, with regular Northern Trains services to Kirkby and Southport.

Atherton is the nearest station to Leigh, one of the largest towns in Britain without its own railway station. The 582 bus service provides a frequent service to Leigh and Bolton.

Although it lies some distance from the centre of the town, the present Atherton station was originally named Atherton Central; this was to differentiate it from the now-closed Atherton Bag Lane on the line from Bolton Great Moor Street to Kenyon Junction) and Howe Bridge on the line between Wigan North Western and Manchester Exchange.

== History ==
The station dates from 1888, when the Lancashire and Yorkshire Railway opened a direct line between Windsor Bridge Junction and Crow Nest Junction (near Hindley) to shorten its main line between Manchester and Liverpool and avoid the congested Bolton area. It was well used from the beginning and was subsequently quadrupled shortly after the turn of the century, later carrying through expresses from Manchester to Blackpool, Windermere and Glasgow (again to avoid Bolton) in addition to Liverpool workings.

The station became part of the London, Midland and Scottish Railway during the Grouping of 1923, and then passed on to the London Midland Region of British Railways on nationalisation in 1948.

The cutbacks of the mid to late 1960s saw all the long-distance services diverted via other routes, rendering the additional ("fast line") tracks obsolete and they were taken out of use on 21 November 1965. The inner tracks and platform faces on each side were retained to serve the two remaining lines to begin with (even though the tracks had previously been arranged with fast lines serving one island platform and the slows the other), but in the late 1980s the surviving tracks were realigned so as to serve just one of the two island platforms (the one used by the old fast lines) in order to allow the other to be abandoned. It was subsequently demolished and the former site is now heavily overgrown.

During the early to middle 1970s, the station had a sparse service outside weekday peak periods (see British Railways timetable 95, 1974) but in more recent times, the frequency levels have improved considerably with financial support from GMPTE, with a resultant increase in patronage.

When Sectorisation was introduced in the 1980s, the station was served by Regional Railways with support from the PTE, an arrangement that continued after the Privatisation of British Railways with co-operation from the current operating company.

== Facilities ==
The station has a ticket office, which is staffed seven days a week; a self-service ticket machine is also available in the booking hall. There is a waiting room at platform level, along with digital information screens, timetable posters and a P.A system to offer automated train running announcements. Step-free access to the platform from the ticket office is via a lift, but this is not available when the ticket office is closed.

== Service ==
Monday to Saturday daytimes, there are two departures each hour to Manchester Victoria (one of which continues through to Blackburn via Todmorden and the other to Leeds) and two per hour towards Wigan, one of which continues to Kirkby northbound via Wigan Wallgate whilst the other terminates at Wallgate. Only a limited direct service now operates onward to Southport (in the early morning, evening peak and late nights since the winter 2019 timetable change) through the week and on Saturdays. There are also a few services that terminate/start from Wigan North Western in the business peaks and late evening.

Recent timetables provide a convenient connection (although a platform change must be made which is not possible for wheelchair users) at Hindley for services to Bolton.

On 23 May 2010 a Sunday service was introduced as a 12-month trial by GMPTE, providing an hourly service until the early evening. Previously no trains had called at the station on Sundays since the summer of 1966. This service remains in operation in the current 2021 timetable, running hourly to Southport and to Blackburn via Manchester Victoria and Rochdale.

== In media ==
Atherton railway station gained notability in 2016, when it was the scene of a filmed arrest. Frank Garnett, of Ancoats, arranged to meet up with what he thought was a 14-year-old girl but was instead approached by vigilante group Nonces Not Welcome. The group had stung Garnett, who was filmed being arrested and handcuffed when police arrived. Garnett claimed he had a son and had "never done this" in his life. He also accused the hunters of "doing it for the sake of it" and trying to ruin his career.

Preceding station	National Rail	Following station
Hag Fold	Northern Trains; Manchester-Headbolt Lane; Manchester-Southport Line	Walkden
