= Northern Trains =

British state-owned train operating company

Northern

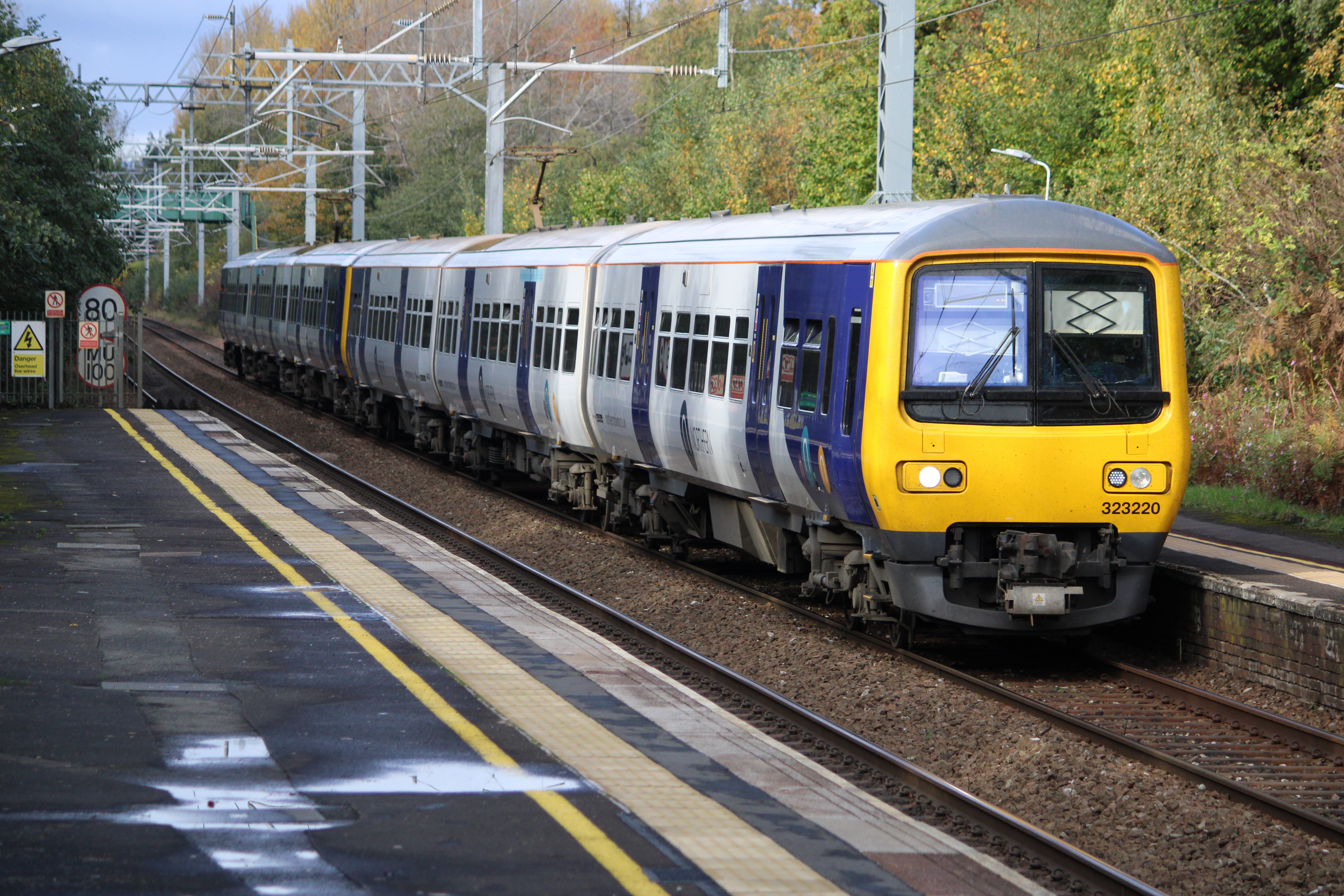
- A Northern Class 323 train at Kearsley

Overview
- Franchise: Northern
- Main regions: North East; North West; Yorkshire and the Humber
- Other regions: East Midlands; West Midlands
- Fleet: Class 150 Sprinter; Class 155 Super Sprinter; Class 156 Super Sprinter; Class 158 Express Sprinter; Class 170 Turbostar; Class 195 Civity; Class 323; Class 331 Civity; Class 333; Class 769 Flex
- Stations operated: 468 (2025)
- Parent company: DfT Operator
- Headquarters: York
- Reporting mark: NT
- Dates of operation: 1 March 2020 – present
- Predecessor: Arriva Rail North

Technical
- Length: 3,180 km (1,980 miles)

Other
- Website: www.northernrailway.co.uk
Route map

Northern Trains Limited, trading as Northern, is a state-owned British train operating company that operates local services and medium-distance inter-city routes in the North of England. It is owned by DfT Operator for the Department for Transport (DfT), after the previous operator Arriva Rail North had its franchise terminated at the end of February 2020; this was amid widespread dissatisfaction over its performance, particularly in respect of poorly implemented timetable changes.

The company commenced operating the Northern franchise on 1 March 2020; the DfT had opted to hand the operation of the franchise over to the operator of last resort. At the commencement of operations, Northern publicly stated that its immediate aims were to improve service reliability and to proceed with the introduction of new rolling stock. For the latter, both the Class 195 diesel multiple units and Class 331 electric multiple units were brought into service fully during December 2020.

Services have been disrupted by wider events, particularly the COVID-19 pandemic. Northern was also affected by the 2022–2024 United Kingdom railway strikes, the largest national rail strikes in the UK in three decades. Although strikes stopped in 2024, the franchise has been affected by rest day working restrictions that have continued to regularly affect Sunday services into 2026.

Long-term changes will include the replacement of Class 323s with Class 350s in 2027, and procurement of up to 386 new-build trains totalling 896 carriages - with planned introduction from 2030 in two phases with a further phase to be developed. These new trains will replace most of the current fleet including all ageing Sprinter trains, and Class 333 units. The company will benefit from streamlined fleets to reduce both training and maintenance requirements, allowing for operational improvements as well as reduced carbon emissions.

== History ==
=== Background ===
In December 2015, the Department for Transport (DfT) awarded Arriva a contract to operate the Northern franchise as Arriva Rail North. It commenced in April 2016 and was originally scheduled to run until March 2025. Within two years, the franchise was being widely criticised, in particular for troubled implementation of a new timetable in May 2018 that resulted in widespread delays and cancellations. Later in 2018, performance continued to suffer, with many passengers protesting and a reduced service on Saturdays due to industrial action. By November 2018, Arriva were re-evaluating their future involvement in the franchise due to a combination of declining passenger numbers as a result of the chaotic May 2018 timetable change and increasing compensation claims as a result of falling punctuality.

In June 2019, the DfT's operator of last resort, DfT OLR Holdings (later renamed DfT Operator), conducted due diligence into the franchise believing both the operational and financial performance to be "unsustainable". In October 2019, the Secretary of State for Transport, Grant Shapps, issued a request for proposals to incumbent operator Arriva and the operator of last resort, which would result in termination of the franchise with either Arriva to be awarded a short-term management contract or the operator of last resort to take over. In January 2020, Shapps publicly criticised Arriva's operation of the Northern franchise and suggested that the Government may step in to revoke its franchise agreement, bluntly referring to the service as "completely unacceptable".

On 29 January 2020, the DfT announced its decision to terminate Arriva Rail North as operator of the franchise, to be taken over by the DfT's operator of last resort. This was the first time that a franchise has been removed from a train operating company due to poor performance since Connex South Eastern in 2003. On 1 March 2020, the franchise became directly operated by DfT OLR Holdings with the stated objective to "stabilise performance and restore reliability for passengers".

=== Changes and events ===
By mid-2020, Northern had considerably curtailed its services in response to the significant decline of passenger travel amid the COVID-19 pandemic. From 15 June 2020, both passengers and staff on public transport in England, including Northern services, were required to wear face coverings while travelling, and that anyone failing to do so would be liable to be refused travel or fined.

In 2021, Northern was given a contract by the DfT to run services for three years, with an optional extension of a further two years. The contract was updated in 2022, to run until 1 March 2025.

Northern is one of several train operators affected by the 2022–2024 United Kingdom railway strikes, which were the first national rail strikes in the UK for three decades. Its workers are amongst those who voted to take industrial action due to a dispute over pay and working conditions. Northern urged the travelling public to avoid travelling on its services on any of the planned dates for the strikes, being only capable of operating a minimal timetable due to the number of staff involved.

== Services ==
Northern took over all the services operated by Arriva Rail North on 1 March 2020.

=== Table of off-peak services ===
Below is a simplified list of frequent Monday to Saturday off-peak services, as of December 2025 timetables:

==== North East ====
Northumberland Line and East Coast Main Line
Route	tph	Calling at
Newcastle – Ashington	2	Manors (1 tph), Northumberland Park, Seaton Delaval, Newsham; Blyth Bebside, Bedlington
Newcastle – Morpeth	1	Manors; Cramlington; 2 trains per day continue to Chathill, calling at Pegswood, Widdrington, Acklington and Alnmouth
Newcastle – Darlington	–	Chester-le-Street; Durham; 2 trains per day northbound and 1 train per day southbound
Tyne Valley and Durham Coast Lines
Route	tph	Calling at
Carlisle – Newcastle	1	Haltwhistle; Hexham; Prudhoe; MetroCentre
Hexham – Newcastle	1	Corbridge; Riding Mill; Stocksfield; Prudhoe; Wylam; Blaydon; MetroCentre; Dunston
Carlisle – Middlesbrough	1	Wetheral; Brampton; Haltwhistle; Bardon Mill; Haydon Bridge; Hexham; Prudhoe; MetroCentre; Newcastle; Sunderland; Hartlepool; Stockton; Thornaby
Newcastle – Nunthorpe	1	Heworth; Sunderland; Seaham; Horden, Hartlepool; Seaton Carew; Billingham; Stockton; Thornaby, Middlesbrough; James Cook University Hospital; Marton; Gypsy Lane
Esk Valley Line
Middlesbrough – Whitby	6 tpd	James Cook University Hospital; Marton; Gypsy Lane; Nunthorpe; Great Ayton; Battersby; Kildale; Commondale; Castleton Moor; Danby; Lealholm; Glaisdale; Egton; Grosmont; Sleights; Ruswarp
Tees Valley Line
Route	tph	Calling at
Saltburn – Darlington	1	Marske; Longbeck; Redcar East; Redcar Central; Middlesbrough; Thornaby; Eaglescliffe; Allens West; Dinsdale
Saltburn – Bishop Auckland	1	Marske; Longbeck; Redcar East; Redcar Central; South Bank; Middlesbrough; Thornaby; Eaglescliffe; Allens West; Dinsdale; Darlington; North Road; Heighington; Newton Aycliffe; Shildon

==== North West ====
Furness, Windermere and Cumbrian Coast Lines
Route	tph	Calling at
Manchester Airport – Barrow-in-Furness	1	Gatley; Manchester Piccadilly; Manchester Oxford Road; Deansgate; Bolton; Chorley; Preston; Lancaster; Carnforth; Silverdale; Arnside; Grange-over-Sands; Kents Bank; Cark & Cartmel; Ulverston; Dalton; Roose; 4 trains per day each run as Manchester Airport to Windermere, and Lancaster to Carlisle, services instead.
Barrow-in-Furness – Carlisle	1	Askam; Kirkby-in-Furness; Foxfield; Green Road; Millom; Silecroft; Bootle; Ravenglass; Drigg; Seascale; Sellafield; St Bees; Corkickle; Whitehaven; Parton; Harrington; Workington; Flimby; Maryport; Aspatria; Wigton; Dalston; 4 trains per day run as Lancaster to Carlisle services; 5 trains per day also call at Nethertown & Braystones
Oxenholme Lake District – Windermere	1	Kendal; Burneside; Staveley; 4 trains per day run as Manchester Airport to Windermere services
Morecambe branch line
Route	tph	Calling at
Lancaster – Morecambe	1	Bare Lane: Hourly service supplemented/modified by additional trains from Leeds.; 1 train per day extends to Heysham Port.
Liverpool–Wigan and Blackpool branch lines
Route	tph	Calling at
Liverpool Lime Street – Wigan North Western	2	Edge Hill; Wavertree Technology Park; Broad Green; Roby; Huyton; Prescot; Eccleston Park; Thatto Heath; St Helens Central; Garswood; Bryn
Liverpool Lime Street – Blackpool North	1	Huyton; St Helens Central; Wigan North Western; Euxton Balshaw Lane; Leyland; Preston; Poulton-le-Fylde
Manchester Airport – Blackpool North	2	Heald Green (1 tph); Manchester Piccadilly; Manchester Oxford Road; Deansgate; Salford Crescent; Bolton; Lostock; Horwich Parkway; Blackrod (1 tph); Adlington (1 tph); Chorley; Buckshaw Parkway; Leyland; Preston; Kirkham & Wesham; Poulton-le-Fylde; Layton (1 tph); Trains either serve Heald Green, Blackrod and Adlington, or Layton.
Preston – Blackpool South	1	Salwick (3 tpd); Kirkham & Wesham; Moss Side; Lytham; Ansdell & Fairhaven; St Annes-on-the-Sea; Squires Gate; Blackpool Pleasure Beach
East Lancashire and Ormskirk branch lines
Route	tph	Calling at
Preston – Colne	1	Lostock Hall; Bamber Bridge; Pleasington; Cherry Tree; Mill Hill; Blackburn; Rishton, Church & Oswaldtwistle; Accrington; Huncoat; Hapton; Rose Grove; Burnley Barracks; Burnley Central; Brierfield; Nelson
Ormskirk – Preston	1	Burscough Junction; Rufford; Croston
Liverpool–Manchester lines
Route	tph	Calling at
Liverpool Lime Street – Manchester Oxford Road	1	Edge Hill; Mossley Hill; West Allerton; Liverpool South Parkway; Hough Green; Warrington West; Warrington Central; Padgate; Birchwood; Glazebrook (1 tp2h), Irlam; Flixton; Chassen Road (1 tp2h); Urmston; Humphrey Park (1 tp2h); Trafford Park (1 tp2h); Most trains either call at Glazebrook and Chassen Road or Humphrey Park and Trafford Park.
Liverpool Lime Street – Warrington Central	1	Mossley Hill; West Allerton; Liverpool South Parkway; Hunts Cross; Halewood; Hough Green; Widnes; Sankey for Penketh (2 tpd); Warrington West
Liverpool Lime Street – Manchester Airport	1	Edge Hill; Wavertree Technology Park; Broad Green; Roby; Huyton; Whiston; Rainhill; Lea Green; St Helens Junction; Earlestown; Newton-le-Willows; Patricroft; Eccles; Deansgate; Manchester Oxford Road; Manchester Piccadilly; Mauldeth Road; Burnage; East Didsbury; Gatley; Heald Green
Ellesmere Port – Helsby	2 tpd	Ince & Elton
Crewe-Manchester, Mid-Cheshire, Stafford–Manchester and Buxton lines
Route	tph	Calling at
Manchester Piccadilly – Crewe	1	Mauldeth Road; Burnage; East Didsbury; Gatley; Heald Green; Manchester Airport; Styal; Wilmslow; Alderley Edge; Holmes Chapel; Sandbach
Manchester Piccadilly – Crewe	1	Levenshulme; Heaton Chapel; Stockport; Cheadle Hulme; Handforth; Wilmslow; Alderley Edge; Chelford; Goostrey; Holmes Chapel; Sandbach
Manchester Piccadilly – Alderley Edge	1	Levenshulme; Heaton Chapel; Stockport; Cheadle Hulme; Handforth; Wilmslow
Manchester Piccadilly – Chester	1	Stockport; Navigation Road; Altrincham; Hale; Ashley; Mobberley; Knutsford; Plumley; Lostock Gralam, Northwich; Greenbank; Cuddington; Delamere; Mouldsworth
Manchester Piccadilly – Stoke-on-Trent	1	Stockport; Cheadle Hulme; Bramhall; Poynton; Adlington; Prestbury; Macclesfield; Congleton; Kidsgrove
Manchester Piccadilly – Buxton	1	Levenshulme; Heaton Chapel; Stockport; Davenport; Woodsmoor; Hazel Grove; Middlewood (1 tp2h); Disley; New Mills Newtown; Furness Vale; Whaley Bridge; Chapel-en-le-Frith; Dove Holes (1 tp2h); Services either call at Middlewood or Dove Holes.
Manchester Piccadilly – Hazel Grove	1	Levenshulme; Heaton Chapel; Stockport; Davenport; Woodsmoor
Glossop and Hope Valley Lines
Route	tph	Calling at
Manchester Piccadilly – Hadfield	2	Ardwick (1 tpd westbound only); Ashburys; Guide Bridge; Flowery Field; Newton for Hyde; Godley; Hattersley; Broadbottom; Dinting; Glossop
Manchester Piccadilly – Rose Hill Marple	4/3	Ashburys; Gorton; Fairfield; Guide Bridge; Hyde North; Hyde Central; Woodley; Romiley
Manchester Piccadilly – New Mills Central	1	Ardwick (1 tpd eastbound only); Ashburys; Belle Vue; Ryder Brow; Reddish North; Brinnington; Bredbury; Romiley; Marple; Strines
Manchester Piccadilly – Sheffield	1	Reddish North; Brinnington; Bredbury; Romiley; Marple; New Mills Central; Chinley; Edale; Hope; Bamford; Hathersage; Grindleford; Dore & Totley
Manchester–Southport and Kirkby branch lines
Route	tph	Calling at
Southport – Manchester Oxford Road	1	Meols Cop; Burscough Bridge; Parbold; Appley Bridge; Gathurst; Wigan Wallgate; Ince; Hindley; Westhoughton; Bolton; Salford Crescent; Deansgate
Southport – Stalybridge	1	Meols Cop; Bescar Lane (1 tp2h); New Lane (1 tp2h); Burscough Bridge; Hoscar (1 tp2h); Parbold; Appley Bridge; Gathurst; Wigan Wallgate; Ince; Hindley; Westhoughton; Bolton; Moses Gate; Farnworth; Kearsley; Clifton (1 tpd); Salford Crescent; Salford Central; Manchester Victoria; Ashton-under-Lyne; Bescar Lane, New Lane and Hoscar served by the same trains
Headbolt Lane – Blackburn	1	Rainford; Upholland; Orrell; Pemberton; Wigan Wallgate; Hindley; Daisy Hill; Hag Fold; Atherton; Walkden; Swinton; Salford Crescent; Salford Central; Manchester Victoria; Rochdale; Smithy Bridge; Littleborough; Todmorden; Burnley Manchester Road; Rose Grove; Accrington
Ribble Valley line
Route	tph	Calling at
Blackburn – Rochdale	1	Darwen; Bromley Cross; Hall i' th' Wood; Bolton; Salford Crescent; Salford Central; Manchester Victoria; Moston; Mills Hill; Castleton
Clitheroe – Rochdale	1	Whalley; Langho; Ramsgreave & Wilpshire; Blackburn; Darwen; Entwistle; Bromley Cross; Hall i' th' Wood; Bolton; Salford Crescent; Salford Central; Manchester Victoria; Moston; Mills Hill; Castleton; Limited Saturday extensions from Clitheroe to Ribblehead calling at Hellifield, Settle and Horton in Ribblesdale.

==== Yorkshire and the Humber ====
Huddersfield Line
Route	tph	Calling at
Leeds – Bradford Interchange	1	Cottingley; Morley; Batley; Dewsbury; Ravensthorpe; Mirfield; Brighouse; Halifax; Low Moor
Wharfedale and Airedale lines
Route	tph	Calling at
Leeds – Bradford Forster Square	2	Kirkstall Forge; Apperley Bridge; Shipley; Frizinghall
Leeds – Ilkley	2	Guiseley; Menston; Burley-in-Wharfedale; Ben Rhydding
Bradford Forster Square – Ilkley	2	Frizinghall; Shipley; Baildon; Guiseley; Menston; Burley-in-Wharfedale; Ben Rhydding
Leeds – Skipton	2	Shipley; Saltaire; Bingley; Crossflatts; Keighley; Steeton & Silsden; Cononley
Bradford Forster Square – Skipton	2	Frizinghall; Shipley; Saltaire; Bingley; Crossflatts; Keighley; Steeton & Silsden; Cononley
Harrogate Line
Route	tph	Calling at
Leeds – York	2	Burley Park; Headingley; Horsforth; Weeton; Pannal; Hornbeam Park; Harrogate; Starbeck, Knaresborough; Cattal; Hammerton; Poppleton
Pontefract Line
Route	tph	Calling at
Leeds – Knottingley	1	Woodlesford; Castleford; Glasshoughton; Pontefract Monkhill; 2 trains per day extend to Goole, calling at Whitley Bridge, Hensall, Snaith and Rawcliffe.
Leeds – Knottingley	1	Wakefield Westgate; Wakefield Kirkgate; Streethouse; Featherstone; Pontefract Tanshelf; Pontefract Monkhill
Wakefield Line
Route	tph	Calling at
Leeds – Doncaster	1	Outwood; Wakefield Westgate; Sandal & Agbrigg, Fitzwilliam; South Elmsall; Adwick; Bentley
Leeds – Sheffield via Wakefield Westgate	1	Outwood; Wakefield Westgate; Sandal & Agbrigg; Fitzwilliam; Moorthorpe; Thurnscoe; Goldthorpe; Bolton-upon-Dearne; Swinton, Rotherham Central; Meadowhall
Leeds – Sheffield via Wakefield Westgate	1	Wakefield Westgate
Penistone Line
Route	tph	Calling at
Sheffield – Huddersfield	1	Meadowhall; Chapeltown; Elsecar; Wombwell; Barnsley; Dodworth; Silkstone Common; Penistone; Denby Dale; Shepley; Stocksmoor; Brockholes; Honley; Berry Brow; Lockwood
Hallam Line
Route	tph	Calling at
Leeds – Sheffield	1	Woodlesford; Castleford; Normanton; Wakefield Kirkgate; Darton; Barnsley; Wombwell; Elsecar; Chapeltown; Meadowhall
Leeds – Nottingham	1	Wakefield Kirkgate; Barnsley; Meadowhall; Sheffield; Dronfield; Chesterfield; Alfreton; Langley Mill; Ilkeston
Sheffield–Lincoln line
Route	tph	Calling at
Leeds - Lincoln	1	Wakefield Kirkgate; Barnsley; Meadowhall; Sheffield; Darnall; Woodhouse; Kiveton Bridge; Kiveton Park; Shireoaks; Worksop; Retford; Gainsborough Lea Road; Saxilby
Sheffield – Cleethorpes	1 tpd	Worksop; Retford; Gainsborough Central; Kirton Lindsey; Brigg; Barnetby; Grimsby Town; See #Parliamentary services below for more.
York and Selby Lines
Route	tph	Calling at
Leeds – York	1	Cross Gates; Garforth; East Garforth; Micklefield
Halifax – Hull Paragon	1	Bradford Interchange; New Pudsey; Bramley; Leeds; Cross Gates; Garforth; East Garforth; Micklefield; South Milford; Selby; Brough
South Humberside Main Line, Dearne Valley Line and Yorkshire Coast line
Route	tph	Calling at
Doncaster – Scunthorpe	1/2	Kirk Sandall; Hatfield & Stainforth; Thorne South; Crowle; Althorpe
Sheffield – Adwick	1	Meadowhall; Rotherham Central; Swinton; Mexborough; Conisbrough; Doncaster; Bentley
Sheffield – York	3 tpd	Meadowhall; Rotherham Central; Swinton; Moorthorpe; Pontefract Baghill; Sherburn-in-Elmet; Church Fenton; Ulleskelf
Doncaster – Hull Paragon	1	Kirk Sandall; Hatfield & Stainforth; Thorne North; Goole; Saltmarshe (1 tp2h); Gilberdyke; Broomfleet (1 tp2h); Brough; Ferriby; Hessle; Most services call at either Saltmarshe or Broomfleet.
Sheffield – Scarborough	1	Meadowhall; Doncaster; Goole; Brough; Hull Paragon; Cottingham; Beverley; Driffield; Bridlington; Bempton; Hunmanby; Filey; Seamer
Bridlington – York	1	Nafferton; Driffield; Hutton Cranswick; Beverley; Cottingham; Hull Paragon; Brough; Gilberdyke; Howden; Selby; Sherburn-in-Elmet (1tp2h); Church Fenton (1tp2h)
Settle to Carlisle and Leeds to Morecambe
Route	tph	Calling at
Leeds – Carlisle	1/2	Shipley; Bingley; Keighley; Skipton; Hellifield; Settle; Horton in Ribblesdale; Ribblehead; Dent; Garsdale, Kirkby Stephen; Appleby; Langwathby; Lazonby & Kirkoswald; Armathwaite
Leeds – Morecambe	1/2	Shipley; Bingley; Keighley; Skipton; Gargrave; Hellifield; Long Preston; Giggleswick; Clapham; Bentham; Wennington; Carnforth; Lancaster; Bare Lane
Calder Valley line
Route	tph	Calling at
York – Blackpool North	1	Church Fenton; Garforth; Leeds; New Pudsey; Bradford Interchange; Halifax; Hebden Bridge; Burnley Manchester Road; Accrington; Blackburn; Preston; Kirkham & Wesham; Poulton-le-Fylde
Leeds – Manchester Victoria	1	Bramley; New Pudsey; Bradford Interchange; Halifax; Hebden Bridge; Todmorden; Rochdale
Leeds - Chester	1	Bramley; New Pudsey; Bradford Interchange; Low Moor; Halifax; Sowerby Bridge; Mytholmroyd; Hebden Bridge; Todmorden; Rochdale; Manchester Victoria; Newton-le-Willows; Earlestown; Warrington Bank Quay
Leeds – Wigan Wallgate	1	Morley; Batley; Dewsbury; Mirfield; Brighouse; Sowerby Bridge; Mytholmroyd; Hebden Bridge; Todmorden; Walsden; Littleborough; Smithy Bridge; Rochdale; Manchester Victoria; Salford Central; Salford Crescent; Swinton; Moorside; Walkden; Atherton; Hag Fold; Daisy Hill; Hindley; Ince

=== Parliamentary services ===
Twice weekly on Saturday mornings, once in each direction, Northern operates a parliamentary train on the Stockport–Stalybridge line between Stockport and Stalybridge, calling at Reddish South, Denton and Guide Bridge. From 1992 until 2018, this service ran once weekly.

Multiple campaigns were conducted to request increase in services to the line, but in 2022, Transport for Greater Manchester published two surveys in relation to the line.

As of May 2023, there is one train per day between Sheffield and Cleethorpes, via Gainsborough Central and Brigg. This service runs on weekdays only. The service was suspended between January and October 2022, due to concerns related to the COVID-19 pandemic. Between October 1993 and May 2023, this service ran on Saturdays only, but had three trains each way and on weekdays; a few peak services terminated at Gainsborough Central.

== Rolling stock ==
Northern took over all of the rolling stock operated by its predecessor, namely Class 142, 144, 150, 153, 155, 156, Class 158, 170 and 195 diesel multiple units and Class 319, 321, 322, 323, 331 and 333 electric multiple units. All Class 321 and 322 units were withdrawn in mid-2020 and moved to Greater Anglia. All Class 153s were sent to storage by December 2021. 23 Class 156 units were transferred from East Midlands Railway, which included eight of the nine Class 156/9 units formerly used by Greater Anglia, although they were renumbered back to 156/4s before the transfer. For the December timetable change in 2022, five more Class 156 units were transferred. The final Class 156 units were delivered in May 2023. The Class 319s were withdrawn on 2 January 2024.

Between October 2023 and July 2024, 17 Class 323 units were transferred from West Midlands Trains to Northern Trains.

=== Current fleet ===
Family	Class	Image	Type	Top speed		Number	Carriages	Routes	Built
Family	Class	Image	Type	mph	km/h	Number	Carriages	Routes	Built
Diesel multiple units
Sprinter	150/0		DMU	75	120	8	3	Lancashire, Greater Manchester, Liverpool, West Yorkshire, North Lincolnshire, South Yorkshire and Derbyshire	1984–1987
Sprinter	150/1 and 150/2		DMU	75	120	66	2	Lancashire, Greater Manchester, Liverpool, West Yorkshire, North Lincolnshire, South Yorkshire and Derbyshire	1985–1987
Sprinter	150/1 and 150/2		DMU	75	120	66	2	Lancashire, Greater Manchester, Liverpool, West Yorkshire, North Lincolnshire, South Yorkshire and Derbyshire	1985–1987
Sprinter	155 Super Sprinter		DMU	75	120	7	2	York, Leeds, Hull Paragon and Scarborough	1987–1988
Sprinter	156 Super Sprinter		DMU	75	120	67	2	North East, Cumbrian Coast, Lancashire and Cumbria, Merseyside and Cheshire	1987–1989
Sprinter	158 Express Sprinter		DMU	90	145	45	2	South Yorkshire, West Yorkshire, Lancashire, Fylde Coast, North Yorkshire and the North East	1990–1992
Sprinter	158 Express Sprinter		DMU	90	145	8	3	South Yorkshire, West Yorkshire, Lancashire, Fylde Coast, North Yorkshire and the North East	1990–1992
Bombardier Turbostar	170		DMU	100	160	16	3	Scarborough - Sheffield, Leeds-York via Harrogate	2003–2005
CAF Civity	195		DMU	100	160	25	2	Manchester - Derbyshire, Sheffield, Liverpool, Leeds and Barrow in Furness, York-Blackpool, Windermere and Chester - Leeds	2017–2022
CAF Civity	195		DMU	100	160	33	3	Manchester - Derbyshire, Sheffield, Liverpool, Leeds and Barrow in Furness, York-Blackpool, Windermere and Chester - Leeds	2017–2022
	Electric multiple units								
Hunslet Transportation Projects/Holec	323		EMU	90	145	34	3	Manchester-Hadfield, Manchester-Stoke-on-Trent, Manchester-Crewe, Blackpool North - Manchester Airport, and Liverpool-Manchester Airport	1992–1995
CAF Civity	331		EMU	100	160	31	3	Blackpool North - Manchester Airport, Liverpool, Leeds - Skipton, Bradford Forster Square, Doncaster, Ilkley, Bradford Forster Square - Skipton, Ilkley	2017–2020
CAF Civity	331		EMU	100	160	12	4	Electric services in the North West.	2017–2020
CAF/Siemens Transportation Systems	333		EMU	100	160	16	4	Leeds - Bradford Forster Square, Skipton, Ilkley, Bradford Forster Square - Skipton, Ilkley	2000–2003
	Bi-mode multiple units								
BR Second Generation (Mark 3)	769 Flex		BMU	100	160	8	4	Southport - Stalybridge, Southport-Manchester Oxford Road	2017–2020 (1987–1988 as Class 319)

=== Future fleet ===
In August 2023, Northern issued a tender to acquire a contract for up to 450 new trains to replace the older rolling stock in their fleet.

In 2024, Northern issued a tender for up to 329 new trains. The 329 trains are made up of 45 three-coach electric multiple units, 16 four-coach electric multiple units, 108 three-coach bi-mode units, 128 four-coach bi-mode units and 32 four-coach battery electric multiple units.

In January 2025, Northern revealed that they had shortlisted five companies for the replacement of Classes 150, 155 and 156, as well as a fleet of 12 extra EMUs for trans-Pennine electrification. The five companies are Alstom, CAF, Hitachi, Siemens and Stadler. The remaining units will be bi-mode with a pantograph and diesel/battery power; Northern aims to start introducing the new fleet in 2030.

According to an interview with Northern's Strategic Development Director Rob Warnes, the fleet options are as follows:

Northern new fleet plans
Phase	Lot	Reserved Class number	Manufacturer	Description	Purpose	Expected first deliveries
1	1	Class 382	?	12x3-car EMUs	Newly electric TRU services	2030
1	2	Class 780	?	48x3-car and 63x4-car MMUs	Replacement of Class 150, 155 and 156	2031
1	3	Class 781	?	8x4-car BEMUs	Replacement of Class 769	2032
2	1	Class 382	?	34x3-car EMUs, 16x4-car EMUs	Replacement of Class 333	?
2	2	Class 780	?	30x3-car and 20x4-car MMUs	Replacement of Class 158	?
2	3	Class 781	?	24x4-car BEMUs	?	?
3	-	?	?	?	Replacement of Class 170	?

In July 2026, it was announced that Northern would be taking on the 350/2 fleet to replace the Class 323 fleet.

Family	Class	Image	Type	Top speed		Number	Carriages	Routes	Built
Family	Class	Image	Type	mph	km/h	Number	Carriages	Routes	Built
Electric Multiple Units
Siemens Desiro	350/2		EMU	110	180	37	4	Electrified services in the North West.	2008–2009

=== Past fleet ===
Class	Image	Type	Top speed		Number	Carriages	Routes	Notes	Built	Left fleet
Class	Image	Type	mph	km/h	Number	Carriages	Routes	Notes	Built	Left fleet
142 Pacer		DMU	75	120	79	2	Local and commuter services across the North	Replaced by Class 150, 156, 158, 170, and 195 units	1985–1987	2020
144 Pacer		DMU	75	120	23	2	Local and commuter services across the North	Replaced by Class 150, 156, 158, 170, and 195 units	1986–1987	2020
153 Super Sprinter		DMU	75	120	17	1	Local and commuter services across the North	Replaced by Class 150 units, later sent to storage	1987–1988	2020–2021
319/3		EMU	100	160	19	4	Electrified commuter services in the North West	Replaced by Class 331 units	1990	2024
321		EMU	100	160	3	4	Electrified commuter services in West Yorkshire	Replaced by Class 331 units	1991	2020
322		EMU	100	160	5	4	Electrified commuter services in West Yorkshire	Replaced by Class 331 units	1990	2020

== Depots ==
Northern currently has depots for its train crew at: Ashington (conductors), Barrow-in-Furness, Blackburn, Blackpool North, Buxton, Carlisle, Darlington (drivers), Doncaster, Harrogate, Huddersfield, Hull Paragon, Liverpool Lime Street, Leeds, Manchester Piccadilly, Manchester Victoria, Middlesbrough (conductors), Newcastle, Sheffield, Skipton, Wigan Wallgate, Workington and York.

Northern's fleet is maintained at the following depots:

Depot	Allocation	Servicing	Nearest station
Allerton TMD	08, 323, 331, 769	150, 156, 195	Liverpool South Parkway
Ardwick TMD	323	None	Ardwick
Blackburn King Street TMD	None	150, 156, 195	Blackburn
Botanic Gardens TMD	155, 170	158	Hull Paragon
Heaton TMD	156, 158		Manors ( Chillingham Road)
Holbeck TMD	None	150, 158, 195	Leeds
Newton Heath TMD	150, 156, 195	158, 769	Moston
Neville Hill TMD	09, 150, 158, 331, 333	155, 170, 195	Leeds
Wigan Springs Branch TMD	None	158, 195, 331, 769	Wigan North Western

Preceded by Arriva Rail North	Operator of Northern franchise 2020–present	Succeeded by Incumbent
