= Hag Fold railway station =

English railway station

Coordinates: 53.5335°N 2.4939°W

Hag Fold
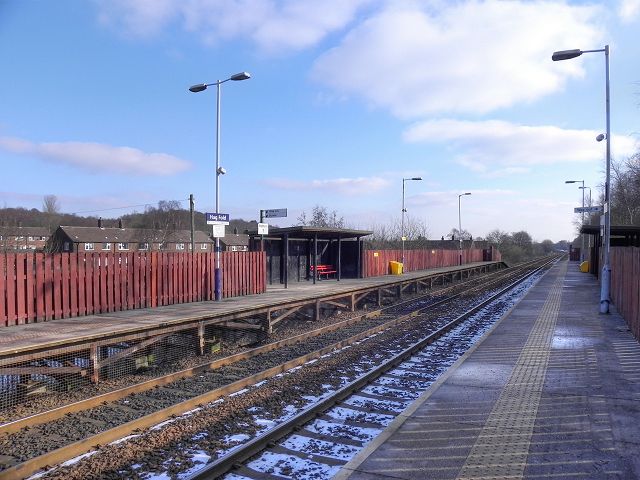

General information
- Location: Atherton, Wigan; England
- Grid reference: SD673042
- Managed by: Northern Trains
- Transit authority: Transport for Greater Manchester
- Platforms: 2

Other information
- Station code: HGF
- Classification: DfT category E

History
- Opened: 11 May 1987

Passengers
- 2020/21: ▼15,112
- 2021/22: ▲46,894
- 2022/23: ▲54,040
- 2023/24: ▲62,586
- 2024/25: ▲73,542
Location
Notes
- Passenger statistics from the Office of Rail and Road

Hag Fold railway station is one of the local stations that lie on the Atherton line, between Wigan and Manchester, England. The station is located 13 miles (20 km) west of Manchester Victoria with regular Northern Trains services to these towns as well as Salford, Swinton, Walkden and Hindley.

The station was built in 1987 by British Rail to serve the Hag Fold estate in Atherton, and is only staffed during the morning and lunchtime period (06:25 to 12:55, weekdays only). Improvement works to the station are planned, in order to replace the flimsy platforms which have begun to suffer from considerable wear and tear and vandalism.

There is step-free access to each platform via inclined ramps. Shelters, digital display screens and timetable poster boards are located on each side; there is also a P.A system provided to supply automated train running announcements.

== Services ==
On Monday to Saturday daytimes, there is generally a half-hourly service southbound towards Manchester Victoria and northbound towards Wigan Wallgate & Headbolt Lane (no service after 19:00) and to Wigan North Western respectively. Southbound trains continue to either Blackburn or Leeds, both via the Calder Valley line.

Recent timetables provide a convenient connection (although a platform change must be made which is not possible for wheelchair users) at Hindley for services to Bolton.

In the evenings there is an hourly service in each direction to Manchester Victoria and Wigan. A twelve-month trial of an hourly clockface Sunday service commenced 23 May 2010. As of November 2021 there is an hourly service for Hag Fold on Sundays in each direction, to Manchester Victoria and Blackburn and to Southport via Wigan Wallgate.

Preceding station	National Rail	Following station
Daisy Hill	Northern Trains; Manchester–Southport line	Atherton
Daisy Hill	Northern Trains; Kirkby branch line	Atherton
