= Littleborough railway station =

Railway station in Greater Manchester, England

Coordinates: 53.6429°N 2.0947°W

Littleborough
- The railway station in 2026

General information
- Location: Littleborough, Rochdale; England
- Grid reference: SD938162
- Manager: Northern
- Platforms: 2

Other information
- Station code: LTL
- Classification: DfT category F2

History
- Opened: 1839

Passengers
- 2020/21: ▼84,514
- 2021/22: ▲0.259 million
- 2022/23: ▲0.307 million
- 2023/24: ▲0.335 million
- 2024/25: ▲0.378 million
Location
Notes
- Passenger statistics from the Office of Rail and Road

Littleborough railway station serves the town of Littleborough in the Metropolitan Borough of Rochdale, Greater Manchester, England.

It lies on the Calder Valley line 13¾ miles (22 km) north of Manchester Victoria towards Halifax, Bradford Interchange and Leeds.

This is the last station on the Caldervale Line in the Greater Manchester area. It was one of the original Manchester and Leeds Railway station sites and for the first year of operation following its opening in July 1839, it was the temporary terminus of the line from Manchester (the section on through the Summit Tunnel towards Mirfield not being completed until 1841). It did so again for some eight months after the December 1984 Summit Tunnel fire – passengers transferring between the trains to/from Manchester and a rail-replacement bus service onwards to Todmorden until repairs to the tunnel could be completed and the line reopened.

== Facilities ==
The station's two platforms are staggered, with the Manchester-bound one (platform 1) the more southerly. Both have ramps & step-free access for disabled travellers. The station is staffed on a part-time basis (six days per week, mornings & early afternoons only), with the ticket office & waiting room on platform 2 open at these times. There are also shelters on both platforms & ticket vending machines available, so travellers can purchase tickets when the booking office is closed.

== Services ==
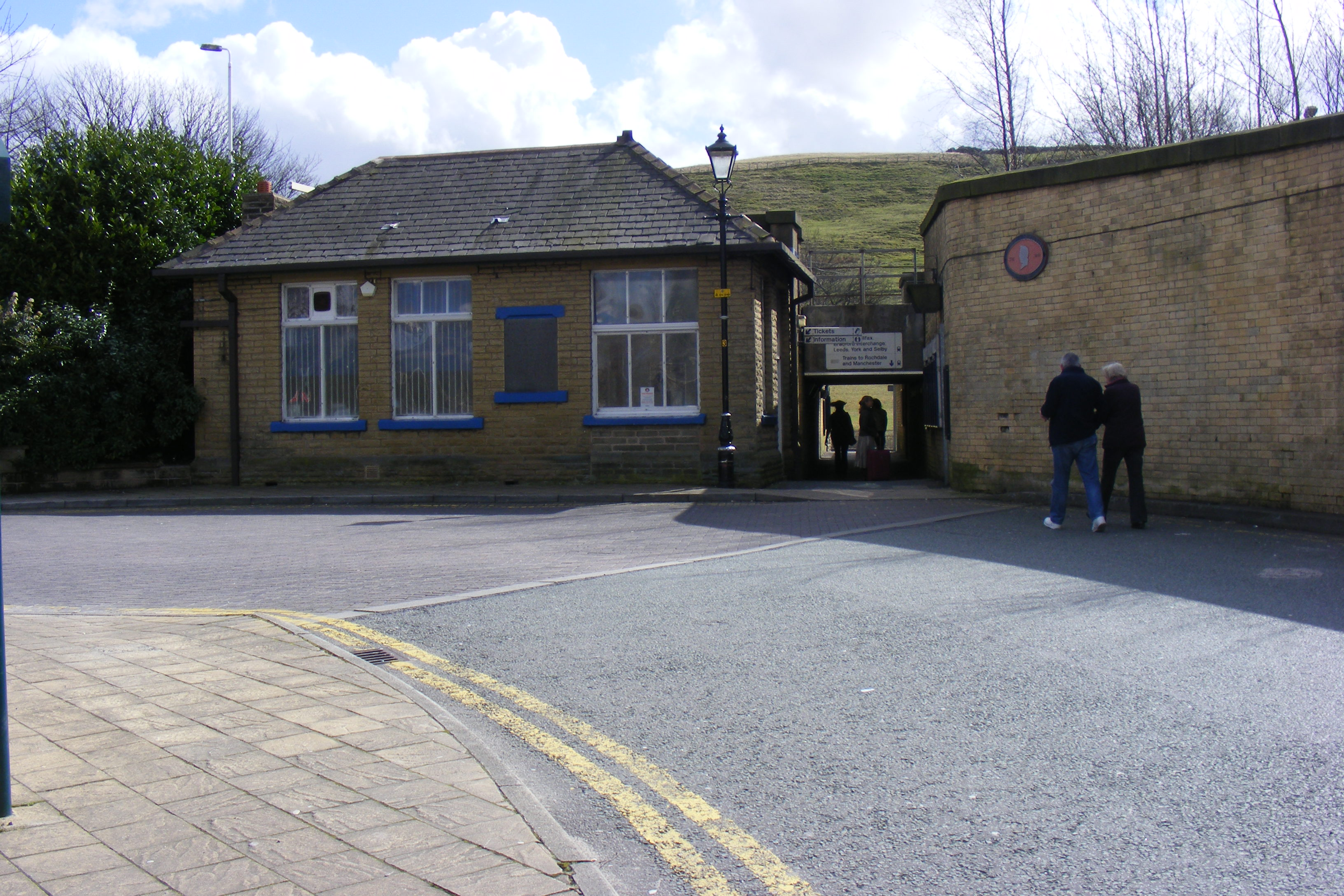
Station approach

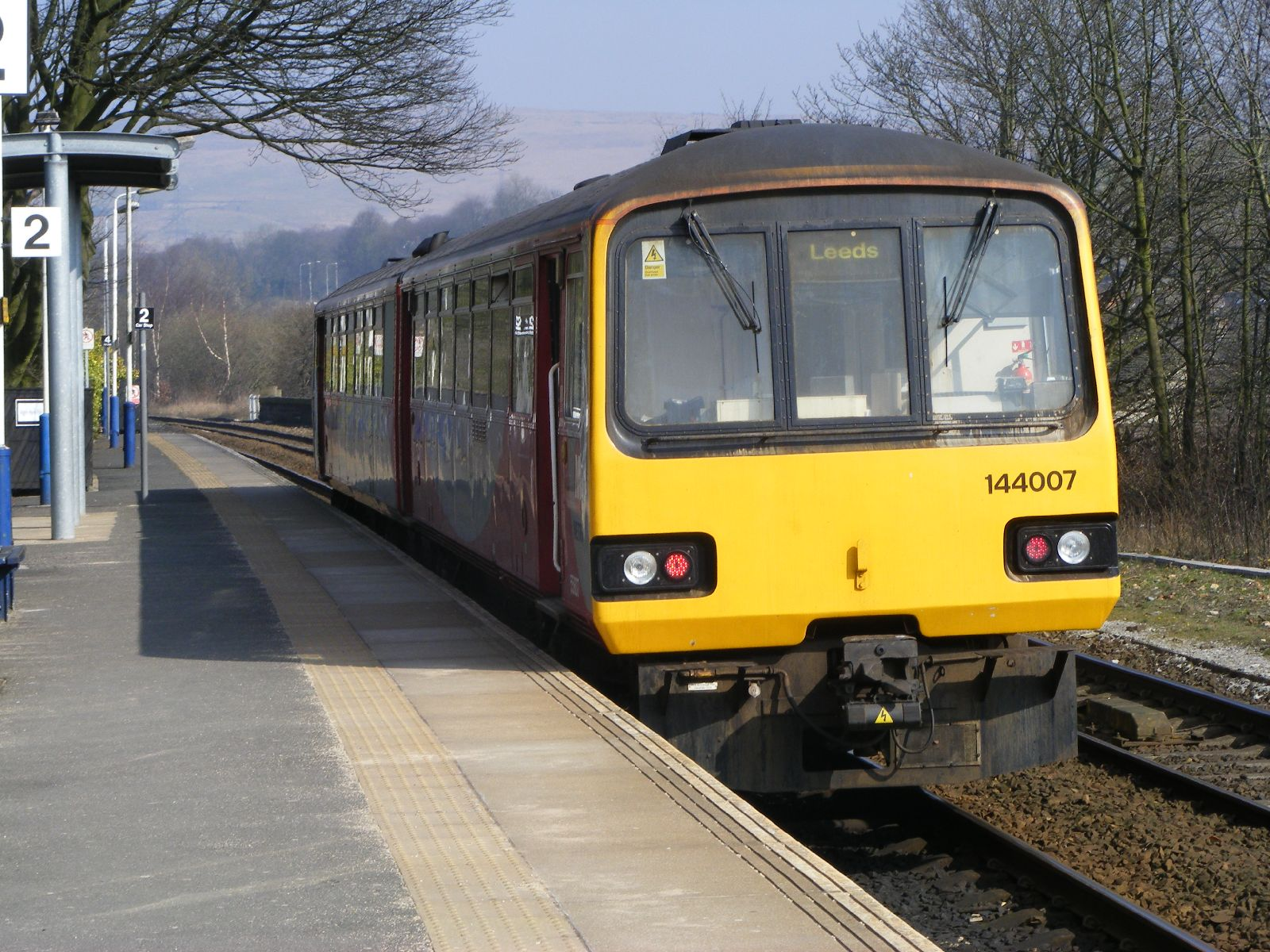
Northern Rail 144007 leaving Platform 2 with a Manchester Victoria to Leeds service in 2009

Monday to Saturday daytimes, there is a half-hourly service from Littleborough to Manchester Victoria westbound and to Todmorden eastbound, with trains running alternately to Leeds via Dewsbury and to Blackburn via Burnley Manchester Road (the latter beginning at the May 2015 timetable change). Westbound trains continue beyond Manchester via Atherton to Headbolt Lane via Wigan Wallgate (since the May 2018 timetable change).

In the early morning, late evening and on Sundays, trains to Leeds operate via Halifax rather than Dewsbury. Sunday services run hourly each way to Blackburn and Leeds and twice each hour to Manchester (with the Blackburn trains continuing to Southport).

Preceding station	National Rail	Following station
Smithy Bridge	Northern; Caldervale Line	Walsden
Smithy Bridge	Northern; Caldervale Line	Todmorden
