= Moorside railway station =

Railway station in Greater Manchester, England

Coordinates: 53.5163°N 2.3526°W

Moorside
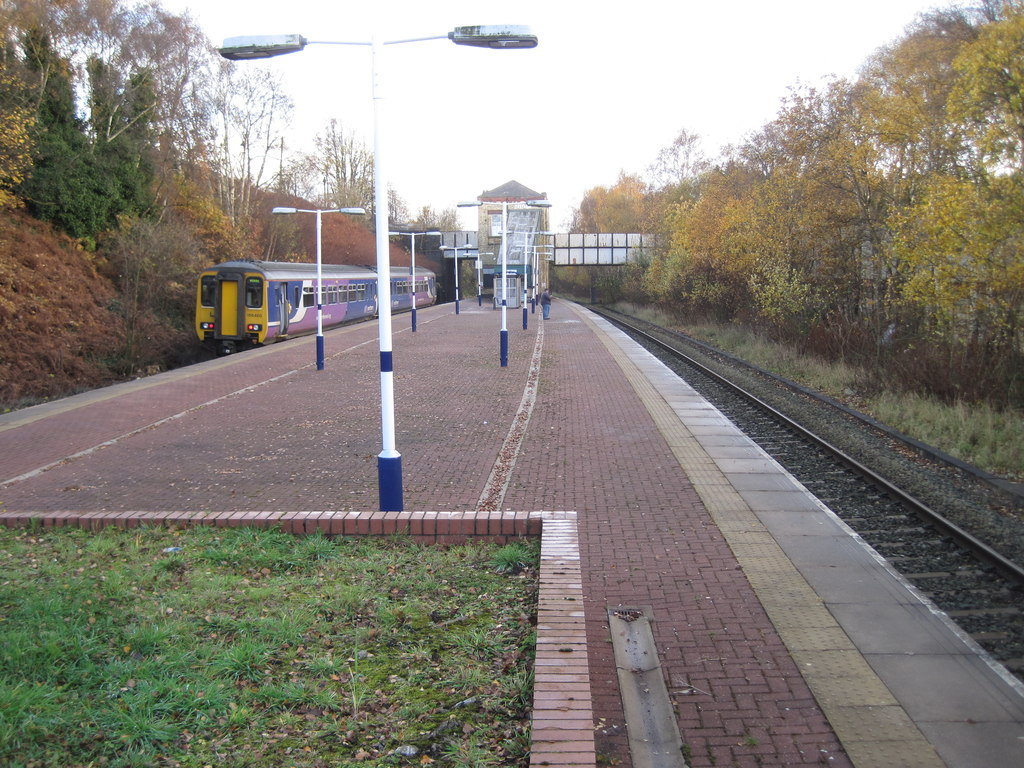

General information
- Location: Wardley, Salford; England
- Grid reference: SD767022
- Manager: Northern Trains
- Transit authority: Greater Manchester
- Platforms: 2

Other information
- Station code: MSD
- Classification: DfT category E

History
- Opened: 1888

Passengers
- 2021/22: ▲28,366
- 2022/23: ▲30,898
- 2023/24: ▲41,004
- 2024/25: ▲42,856
- 2025/26: ▲50,048
Location
Notes
- Passenger statistics from the Office of Rail and Road

Moorside railway station is a railway station serving the town of Wardley, Greater Manchester, England. The station stands on Moorside Road, close to the junction with Chorley Road (A6).

Moorside is a local station on the Atherton Line between Wigan and Manchester, 6 1/2 miles (10.5 km) north-west of Manchester Victoria, with regular Northern Trains services to them as well as Salford, Walkden, Atherton and Hindley.

It was opened in 1888 (along with the line) and, like others on the route, has a single island platform serving the two lines that pass through. When the line was quadrupled at the beginning of the 20th century, the two extra lines were laid to the south of the existing ones and were not given platforms. They were subsequently decommissioned in November 1965 and removed.

Until 6 May 1974, it was named Moorside & Wardley, becoming Moorside on that date.

Moorside is the least used station on the Atherton Line.

On 17 February 2020, the entrance and ticket office were destroyed by a fire. Police believed the fire was started deliberately.

The blaze took place weeks after the station had been refurbished. Prior to the renovation, the station had been regarded as one of the worst on the rail network, with outdated facilities.

== Facilities ==
The station has a ticket office at street level, which is staffed part-time (06:55 - 12:55, weekdays only). Outside these times, tickets must be purchased on the train or prior to travel. Timetable posters offer train running information. Unlike most stations, there are no digital display screens. No step-free access is available, as the only means of getting from the entrance and ticket hall to the platform is via a staircase.

== Service ==
Monday to Saturday daytimes, there is generally an hourly service southbound towards Manchester Victoria and northbound towards Wigan Wallgate and Kirkby. Additional trains call during the weekday peak periods.

Evenings there is an hourly service in each direction to Manchester Victoria and Wigan.

There is now an hourly service in each direction on Sundays, to Southport and Blackburn via Manchester Victoria and the Caldervale Line.

Preceding station	National Rail	Following station
Walkden	Northern Trains; Manchester-Headbolt Lane or Manchester-Southport Line	Swinton
