= Daisy Hill railway station =

Railway station in Greater Manchester, England

Daisy Hill
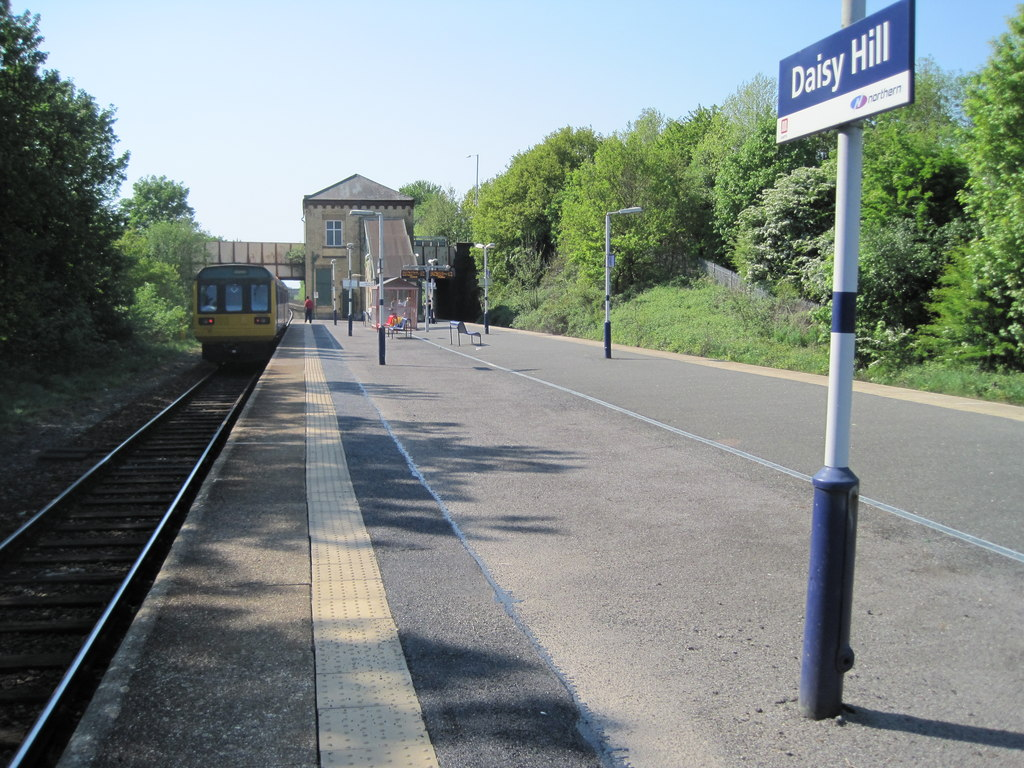

General information
- Location: Westhoughton, Bolton, England
- Coordinates: 53.5394°N 2.5153°W
- Grid reference: SD659048
- Managed by: Northern Trains
- Transit authority: Greater Manchester
- Platforms: 2

Other information
- Station code: DSY
- Classification: DfT category E

History
- Original company: Lancashire and Yorkshire Railway
- Pre-grouping: Lancashire and Yorkshire Railway
- Post-grouping: London, Midland and Scottish Railway

Key dates
- 1 October 1888: Station opened

Passengers
- 2020/21: ▼50,132
- 2021/22: ▲0.150 million
- 2022/23: ▲0.161 million
- 2023/24: ▲0.188 million
- 2024/25: ▲0.195 million
Location
Notes
- Passenger statistics from the Office of Rail and Road

Daisy Hill railway station serves the Daisy Hill area of Westhoughton, in the Metropolitan Borough of Bolton, Greater Manchester, England. It lies on the Manchester-Southport Line. It is located 14 miles (23 km) west of Manchester Victoria, with regular Northern Trains services to Salford, Swinton and Hindley, with onward trains to Kirkby and Southport.

== History ==
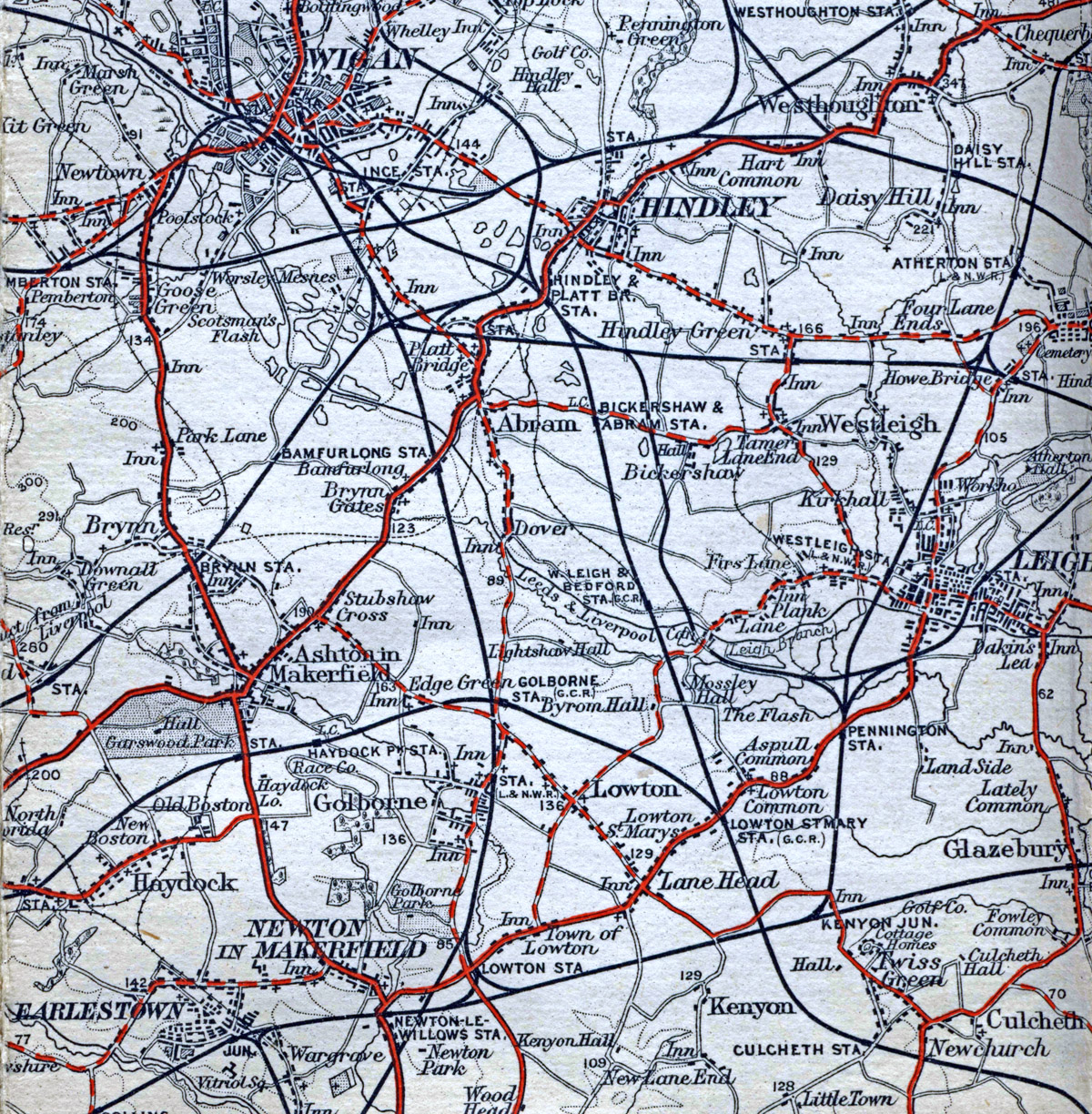
A 1911 map showing the station's location (top right)

The station opened on 1 October 1888. It was the junction of a line to Blackrod which closed completely on 6 September 1965. On 21 November 1965 the two "fast lines" (which, unlike Hindley and Atherton, never had platforms) were taken out of use. These tracks were removed in early 1966, leaving only the lines adjacent to the central island platform.

In the 1970s, the service was sporadic, yet the station was fully staffed. This continued until recent times. Until 2008, the station was continuously staffed for 18 hours. Since 2008, however, the ticket office has closed at 7.25pm (having opened at 6.25am).

In 1974, the station was modernised to some extent. The old British Rail London Midland maroon signage was replaced, the platform canopy removed, the platform toilets and waiting room demolished (to be replaced by a "bus shelter") and the gas lighting replaced with modern electric lighting. The roadside building and ticket office, however, remained relatively untouched.

=== Historical services ===
For many years, Daisy Hill enjoyed what was virtually a peak-only service (although those peak hour trains were well used): there was a gap between 9.45am and 3.45pm for trains to Manchester Victoria. Since then the service has dramatically improved. First hourly and then half-hourly services were introduced.

The typical off-peak service before the pandemic was of three trains per hour to Manchester Victoria (with hourly extensions to one of Blackburn or to Leeds via the Caldervale Line), one to Kirkby and two to Wigan Wallgate. In the evening there are two trains an hour in each direction. The regular daytime service to Southport ended at the start of the winter 2019 timetable, with passengers now having to change at Wigan (except for a few peak-period and late evening trains). Some services also run to Wigan North Western rather than Wallgate. Before the reopening of the Todmorden Curve in 2015, services would terminate at Todmorden instead of Blackburn.

In Autumn 2021, the service was reduced back to two per hour all day: one to Blackburn via Todmorden and the other to Leeds eastbound, with one each to Kirkby and Wigan North Western westbound. Most evening trains terminate at Wigan North Western, though there is one late night through train to Southport. On Sundays, there was an hourly service to Blackburn and Southport.

The December 2022 timetable change saw services from Leeds terminating at Wigan Wallgate instead of Wigan North Western, also calling at Hindley and Ince towards Wigan and calling at Moorside towards Leeds. The Kirkby to Blackburn services no longer call at Ince, Moorside and Walsden. There is still the usual 1 train per hour between Blackburn and Southport on a Sunday.

From December 2024, Northern have operated a reduced Sunday service on the line amidst conductor shortages, with the hourly service being reduced to every two hours in each direction.

An extra train operates from Daisy Hill during weekday peak times, one train per day calling at all stations between Wigan North Western and Manchester Victoria during the morning and returning in the opposite direction during the evening.

The Kirkby services were temporarily curtailed to Rainford between May and September of 2023, until Headbolt Lane station opened and replaced Kirkby as the terminus and interchange between both the Blackburn and Liverpool services.

For many years (since 1966/7), there had been no trains serving Daisy Hill on Sundays. Northern Rail had aspirations to provide a Sunday service for the line for some years and, after a successful campaign, GMPTE provided funds. Sunday trains have run from May 2010.

== Facilities ==
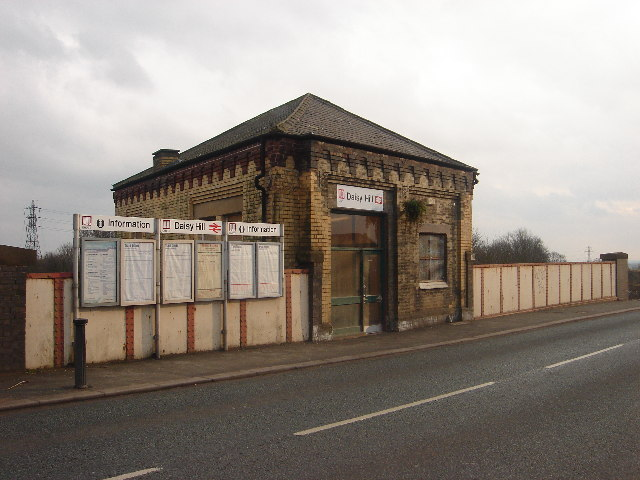
Daisy Hill station

The station is staffed. Information screens in the booking hall show real-time departure information from both platforms, with electronic displays on the platforms and pre-recorded automated announcements.

Local bus services 516 and 607 stop outside the station, with links to most parts of Westhoughton and to Leigh, Horwich, Wigan and Bolton. There is no taxi rank, although a pay phone is found in the booking hall with taxi numbers and other local information. There are no toilet or refreshment facilities. There is a car park with 77 spaces.

The station's island platform was inaccessible to wheelchair users for many years, as the only means of access was via a staircase. A lift was installed from the booking office to platform level, making the station fully accessible in May 2025.

== Service ==
Northern Trains operates the following general off-peak service pattern in trains per hour (tph):

- 2tph to Wigan Wallgate (1tph continues to Headbolt Lane)
- 1tph to Blackburn via Manchester Victoria and Burnley Manchester Road
- 1tph to Leeds via Manchester Victoria and Dewsbury

Preceding station	National Rail	Following station
Hindley	Northern Trains; Manchester–Southport line	Hag Fold
