= Hindley railway station =

Railway station in Greater Manchester, England

Hindley
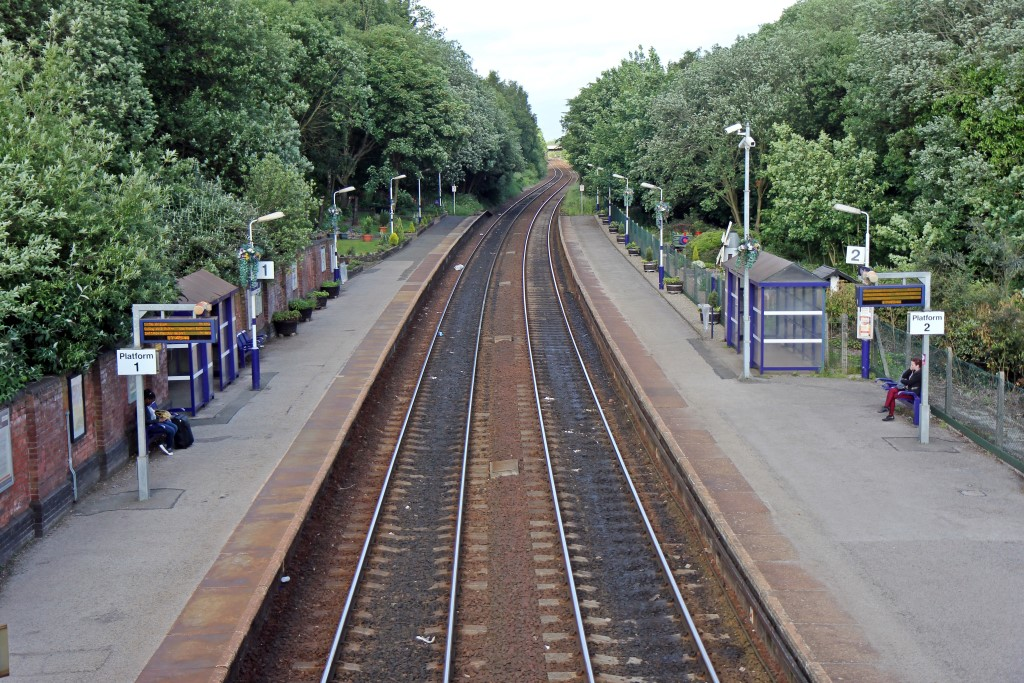
- Hindley railway station in 2015 (before the installation of OLE)

General information
- Location: Hindley, Wigan; England
- Coordinates: 53.5424°N 2.5750°W
- Grid reference: SD619052
- Managed by: Northern Trains
- Transit authority: Greater Manchester
- Platforms: 2 (in use)

Other information
- Station code: HIN
- Classification: DfT category E

History
- Original company: Lancashire and Yorkshire Railway
- Pre-grouping: Lancashire and Yorkshire Railway
- Post-grouping: London, Midland and Scottish Railway

Key dates
- 20 November 1848: Opened as Hindley
- 1 July 1950: Renamed Hindley North
- 6 May 1968: Renamed Hindley

Passengers
- 2020/21: ▼71,492
- Interchange: ▼12,462
- 2021/22: ▲0.206 million
- Interchange: ▲28,737
- 2022/23: ▼0.203 million
- Interchange: ▼26,642
- 2023/24: ▼0.148 million
- Interchange: ▲28,986
- 2024/25: ▲0.240 million
- Interchange: ▼26,115
Location
Notes
- Passenger statistics from the Office of Rail and Road

Hindley railway station is a railway station that serves the town of Hindley in Greater Manchester, England. It is on the Manchester to Southport line, west of where the route branches to use either the Atherton line or the Eastern Branch line via Westhoughton, Lostock and Bolton.

The station is located 14 miles (23 km) west of Manchester Victoria with regular Northern Trains services to these towns as well as Salford, Swinton and Walkden, with onward trains to Kirkby and Southport.

== History ==
This station was opened on 20 November 1848 and was originally named Hindley. It was renamed Hindley North on 1 July 1950 to differentiate it from Hindley South station on the line from Wigan Central to Glazebrook. Hindley South closed in November 1964, and Hindley North was renamed Hindley on 6 May 1968. There were also stations serving Hindley at Platt Bridge and at Hindley Green (both closed in 1961) on the line from Wigan North Western to Manchester Exchange, the residual "fast local" and express passenger service ceasing on 1 January 1968.

At Hindley there are now two platforms in use, with the overgrown remains of two further platforms (for the fast lines taken out of use on 21 November 1965.)

Services from Hindley were suspended in March 2023 to extend the platforms and rebuild the road bridge next to the station for electrification of the line and are planned to resume in July 2023.

== Facilities ==
The car park has been enlarged but passenger numbers have increased so that it is probably in need of further enlargement. The station is staffed on a part-time basis, with the booking office open from the start of service until early afternoon. Outside these hours, tickets must be bought in advance or on the train. The station is not accessible for disabled travellers (as both platforms can only be accessed via stairs or stepped ramps) and has passenger information screens on each platform, along with an automated public address system to offer train running details.

=== Friends of Hindley Station ===
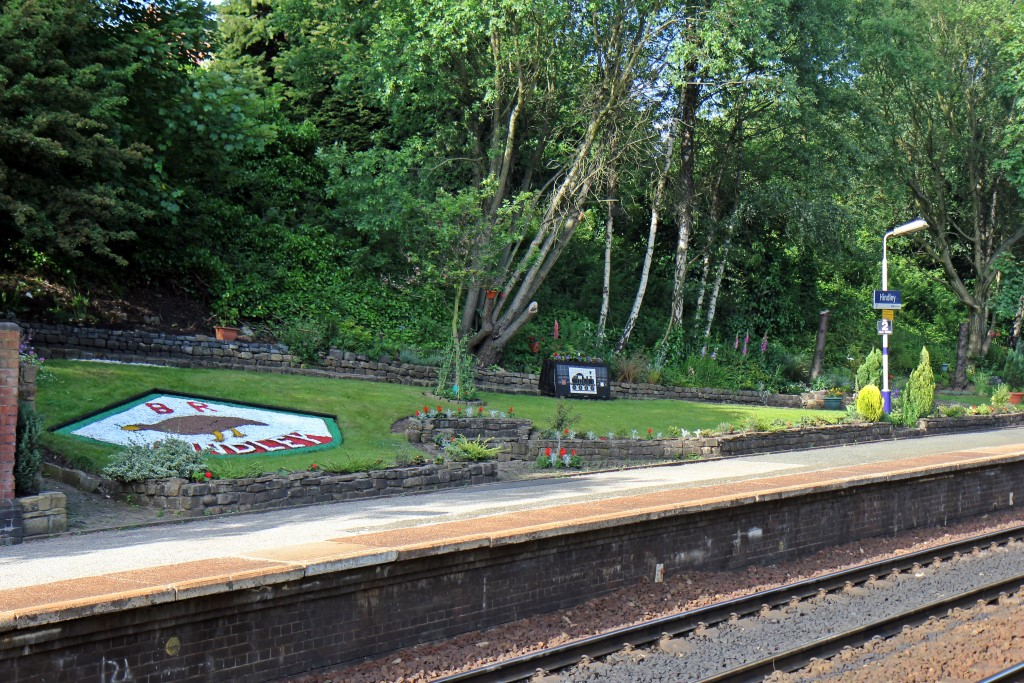
The garden on platform 1

There is now a "Friends of Hindley Station" group, formed in 2007, whose aim is to promote the use of the station by improvements. The group have had several weekend clearing sessions. During one such session a large nameplaque made of stones on the station banking was uncovered. The results objectively can be considered spectacular, evidenced by the number of "in bloom" and landscaping awards won. Also, partially as a result of their input, there was a direct link to Manchester Airport from December 2008. This ended at the May 2018 timetable change and intending travellers now have to change at Manchester Piccadilly or Salford Crescent to reach the airport.

== Services ==
On most weekdays and Saturdays there are 4 trains per hour in each direction - two via Bolton with one being a local stopping service terminating at Stalybridge and the other being a semifast service terminating at Manchester Oxford Road. The other trains go via the Atherton line to Blackburn via Todmorden and the other to Leeds via Dewsbury. All four westbound trains go via Wigan Wallgate with the two Bolton services terminating at Southport, the Blackburn services terminate at Headbolt Lane (until 19:00 where they then terminate at Wallgate) and the Leeds train terminating at Wallgate (except late night services where they terminate at Wigan North Western)

There are two trains per hour on a Sunday. Eastbound trains run via Bolton to Stalybridge and via Atherton to Blackburn. Westbound the Bolton service terminates at Wigan North Western and the Atherton service terminates at Southport.

Services from Hindley were suspended March - July 2023. An hourly replacement bus service operates in a circular route, starting at Hindley and calling at Westhoughton, Daisy Hill before returning to Hindley.

== Electrification ==
In December 2013 it was announced that the line was to be electrified by 2017. A September 2016 update moved the completion date with GRIP Stage 3 being completed by then. On 1 September 2021, it was formally announced the project was proceeding. This means overhead wires will soon going through the station.

In preparation of the electrification work, Network Rail temporarily closed the station on 13 March 2023 to allow for improvement works to be carried out. These works include extending the platforms for 6-car trains in the future and replacing the bridge on Ladies Lane over the station to make room for the overhead wires needed to electrify the line, including alterations to 16 other structures. A line closure was required between the 6th and 12 May 2023 because of this, with rail replacement buses operating between Bolton and Wigan Wallgate via Westhoughton, between Manchester Victoria and Wigan Wallgate via Atherton and trains between Manchester Oxford Road and Southport will be diverted to run via Eccles.

Preceding station	National Rail	Following station
Ince	Northern Trains Southport–Manchester Oxford Road	Westhoughton
Wigan Wallgate	Northern Trains Southport–Stalybridge	Westhoughton
Wigan Wallgate	Northern Trains Headbolt Lane–Blackburn	Daisy Hill
