= Todmorden railway station =

Railway station in West Yorkshire, England

Todmorden
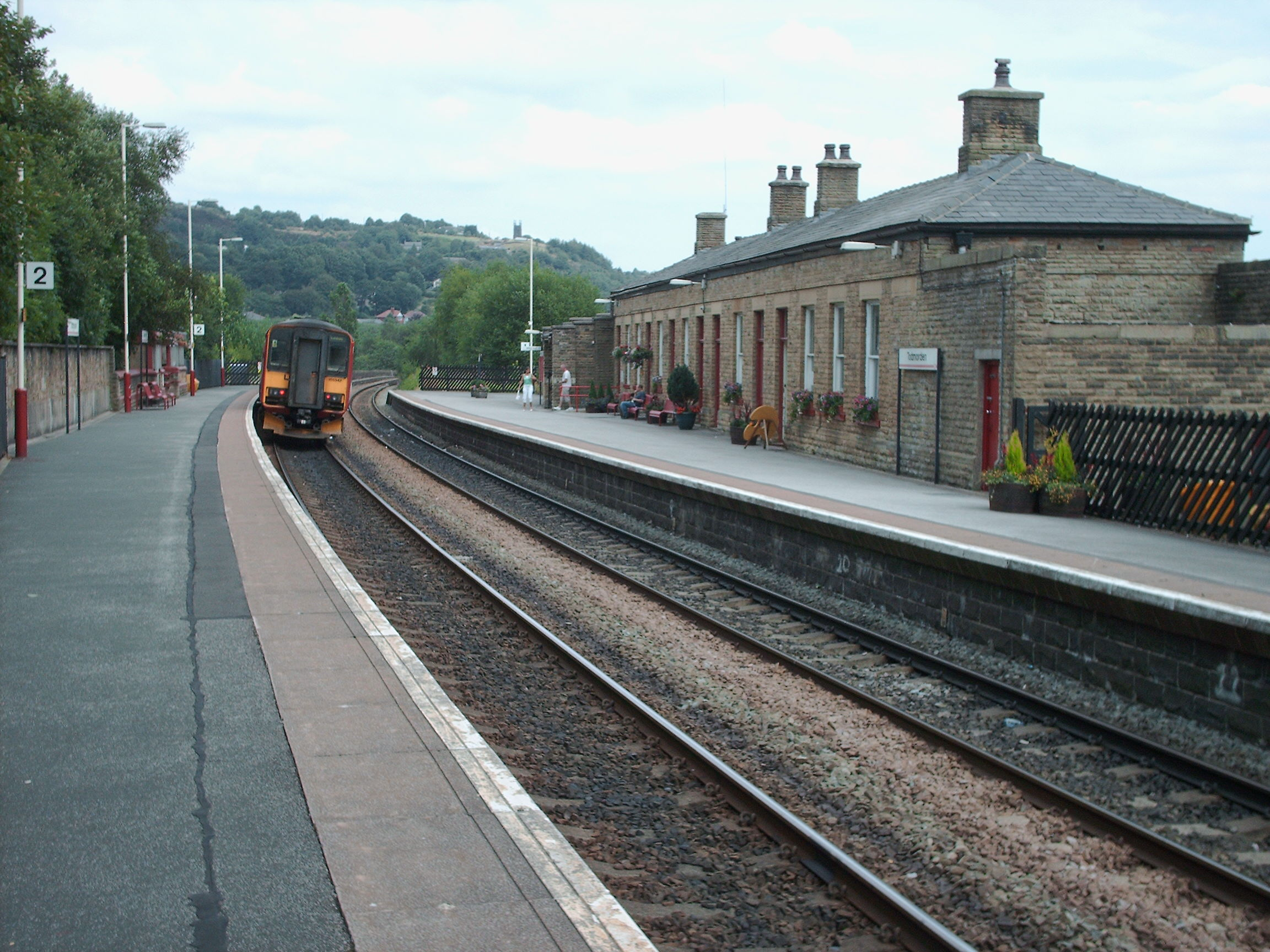
- The view from platform 2 in 2006

General information
- Location: Todmorden, Calderdale; England
- Coordinates: 53.7138°N 2.0997°W
- Grid reference: SD935241
- Manager: Northern
- Transit authority: West Yorkshire (Metro)
- Platforms: 2

Other information
- Station code: TOD
- Fare zone: 5
- Classification: DfT category D

History
- Opened: 1841

Passengers
- 2020/21: ▼0.153 million
- 2021/22: ▲0.431 million
- 2022/23: ▲0.517 million
- 2023/24: ▲0.599 million
- 2024/25: ▲0.718 million
Location
Notes
- Passenger statistics from the Office of Rail and Road

Todmorden railway station serves the town of Todmorden in West Yorkshire, England, originally on the Yorkshire and Lancashire border. It was built by the Manchester and Leeds Railway and is on the Calder Valley line 23 miles (37 km) west of Leeds and 17 miles (27 km) north-east of Manchester Victoria.

It was opened in March 1841 when the final portion of M&L main line between Manchester and Normanton through Summit Tunnel was completed. It became a junction in 1849 with the opening of a branch line westwards through the Cliviger Gorge to Burnley. This was later extended to join the East Lancashire Railway near Rose Grove, giving a direct route to Blackburn, Preston and Blackpool.

For many years the station was served by express trains between Liverpool and York and local trains toward Preston, Bradford and Leeds, but since the Beeching cuts in the 1960s the basic service has been a local one between Leeds and Manchester Victoria. In May 2015, a service from Manchester to Blackburn via Burnley began using the station.

== Todmorden Curve ==
Todmorden station is located by a triangular junction between the lines to Manchester, Burnley and Halifax, with the station itself located on the line towards Manchester. From 1972 until 2015, there was no link between the Manchester and Burnley lines. Railway passengers wishing to travel between Manchester and Burnley had to change at Hebden Bridge or Blackburn.

The station was formerly served by local trains to, and from Rose Grove and Preston, which were withdrawn in 1965 (the bay platform they once used can still be seen). The short curve that allowed trains to travel between Manchester and Burnley was removed in 1972 when the line was re-signalled. Stansfield Hall station used to serve the northern end of the town on this line, but it was closed in 1944.

A project to reinstate the Manchester–Burnley curve was first proposed in 2009, although it was not until the end of 2011 that the finance was finally secured as part of the Regional Growth Fund initiative announced by Deputy Prime Minister Nick Clegg. As first built, the curve ran from a junction approximately 66 feet (20 m) north-east of the viaduct 550 yards (500 m) and connected on to the Copy Pit line at Stanfield Hall Junction, near the footbridge on Stansfield Road (the remains of the curve can still be seen from this bridge).

In 2012, Network Rail began clearing the trackbed of vegetation and investigating the alignment. This assessment concluded that it could be feasible to reinstate the curve, using a slightly less sharp alignment than the original curve. Construction began in summer 2013, with the curve originally planned to be in use from the May 2014 timetable change, delayed from the originally mooted date of the end of 2013, allowing through trains to run from Burnley to Manchester Victoria in less than one hour. Services were delayed due to a lack of available rolling stock and signalling work running behind schedule, and instead began at the May 2015 timetable change.

In addition to the work to lay in new track on the curve itself and a completely new junction at the Todmorden end, significant alterations to the signalling system have been required to allow trains to use the new curve (these were only fully completed in February 2015, which is why the curve could only be used by Burnley-bound trains when the curve was first brought into service). The area is controlled from Preston Power Signal Box. The first train to use the newly commissioned connection was an enthusiasts' charter operated by Pathfinder Tours on 31 May 2014. A regular service began using the curve in May 2015.

== Services ==
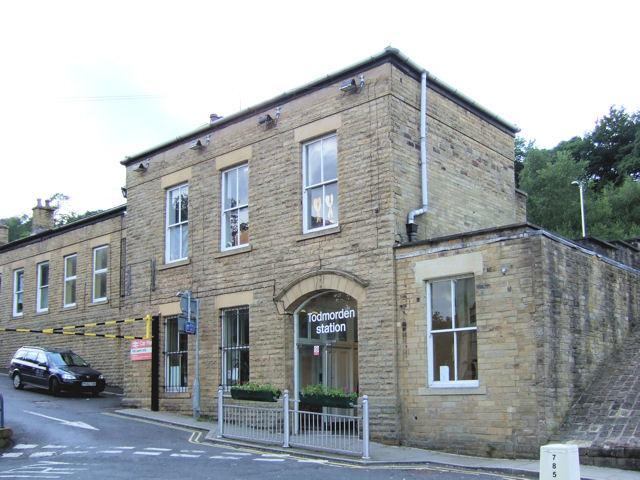
The exterior of the station in 2007

Until 12 December 2008, Monday to Saturday daytime there was a half-hourly service from Todmorden to Manchester Victoria (occasionally extending to Liverpool) westbound and Leeds via Halifax eastbound.

=== Service changes from December 2008 ===
Northern Rail made changes to the Caldervale line services from December 2008. Three trains per hour now run between Leeds and Manchester Victoria – the stopping service that ran prior to the timetable change, calling at all stations via Halifax; via Dewsbury and Brighouse, stopping at Moston, Mills Hill and Castleton; and a limited stop service between Bradford and Manchester, calling at Halifax, Hebden Bridge, Todmorden and Rochdale only.

There is an hourly service to Leeds (via Halifax) in the evenings and two trains per hour to Manchester in the evenings and on Sundays.

From the May 2014 timetable change the station gained an additional service each hour to and from the Manchester direction, which was extended to and from Burnley and Blackburn in May 2015. This working formerly terminated at Rochdale; it ran through from Kirkby eastbound and returned to Wigan Wallgate.

=== Services from May 2015 ===
In May 2015, a direct service from Manchester to Burnley and Blackburn began calling at the station.

=== May 2019 timetable ===
The summer 2019 timetable has four services per hour calling here on weekdays and Saturdays – two between Leeds and Manchester via Bradford (one of which now runs to Chester via Warrington Bank Quay), one from Leeds to Manchester and Southport via Brighouse and one from Blackburn to Manchester and Southport via Burnley. On Sundays, there is one Leeds – Bradford – Manchester train and one between Blackburn and Southport via Manchester each hour in both directions.

=== December 2019 timetable ===
The basic service frequency remains the same in the 2019 winter timetable. However changes have been made.

Southport services now terminate at Wigan Wallgate.

The hourly Sunday service between Leeds and Manchester Victoria via Halifax no longer calls at Mytholmroyd.

=== Future services ===
Under plans submitted by the new Northern franchisee, further service improvements on the Caldervale line were to be introduced in December 2017 (since postponed until May 2019 due to a rolling stock shortage These include an extra train per hour from Todmorden to both Manchester, Bradford and Leeds during the day, extra evening services on all routes and new through services to Chester, Manchester Airport and Liverpool Lime Street (marketed under the "Northern Connect" brand). The Chester service was introduced at the May 2019 timetable change, but the other improvements have been indefinitely postponed because of capacity constraints at the various junctions in the Castlefield and Ordsall Lane area of Manchester.

== Facilities ==
There is a ticket office on platform 1 (staffed seven days per week, but closed in the late evening) and waiting rooms on both platforms. Information screens were installed in 2012 as part of a programme to provide screens at 18 stations on the Caldervale line and elsewhere in West Yorkshire. Previously, passengers had to rely on automated public-address system announcements (these are still provided). Step-free access is only available from platform one, as the subway to platform two has steps.

Platform One Gallery is located at the station, an art gallery run by Todmorden Art Group, which is a non-profit making organisation. It runs exhibitions on a 4-weekly cycle, and is open to the public Thursday-Sunday 11 am-4 pm. It has 11 studios and 2 painting groups.

The station building features a plaque commemorating the engineer John Ramsbottom who was born in the town and spent most of his career working for the local railways (LNWR and LYR).

Preceding station	National Rail	Following station
Walsden	Northern; Caldervale Line	Hebden Bridge or Terminus
Littleborough	Northern; Caldervale Line	Hebden Bridge or Terminus
Rochdale	Northern; Caldervale Line	Hebden Bridge or Terminus
Walsden or Littleborough or Rochdale	Northern; Todmorden-Wigan Wallgate/Kirkby	Terminus
Walsden	Northern via Todmorden Curve	Burnley Manchester Road
	Historical railways	
Walsden; Line and station open	L&YR; Caldervale Line	Eastwood; Line open, station closed
	Disused railways	
Stansfield Hall; Line open, station closed	L&YR; Copy Pit Line	Terminus
