= Upholland railway station =

Railway station in Lancashire, England

Upholland
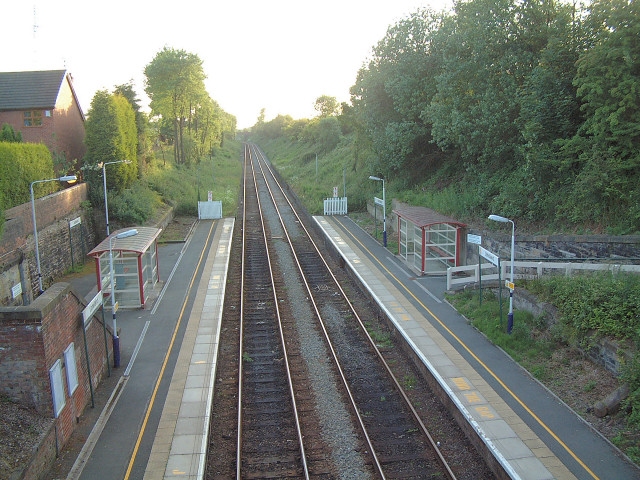

General information
- Location: Up Holland, West Lancashire; England
- Coordinates: 53.528°N 2.741°W
- Grid reference: SD509037
- Manager: Northern Trains
- Platforms: 2

Other information
- Station code: UPL
- Classification: DfT category F2

History
- Original company: Liverpool and Bury Railway
- Pre-grouping: Lancashire and Yorkshire Railway
- Post-grouping: London Midland and Scottish Railway

Key dates
- 20 November 1848: Opened as Pimbo Lane
- 13 October 1900: Renamed Up Holland
- 1902: Renamed Upholland

Passengers
- 2021/22: ▲21,396
- 2022/23: ▲21,698
- 2023/24: ▲22,410
- 2024/25: ▲27,684
- 2025/26: ▲30,202
Location
Notes
- Passenger statistics from the Office of Rail and Road

Upholland railway station serves the small town of Up Holland in the southern Lancashire/Wigan boundary area of England. It is on the Kirkby branch line from Wigan Wallgate and means the service (which is provided by Northern Trains, who also manage the station) runs through three counties on its journey from Wigan to Kirkby.

Upholland has been named in past Lancashire County Council reports as a possible site of a rail link to Skelmersdale, but as yet no firm plans have been made.

== History ==
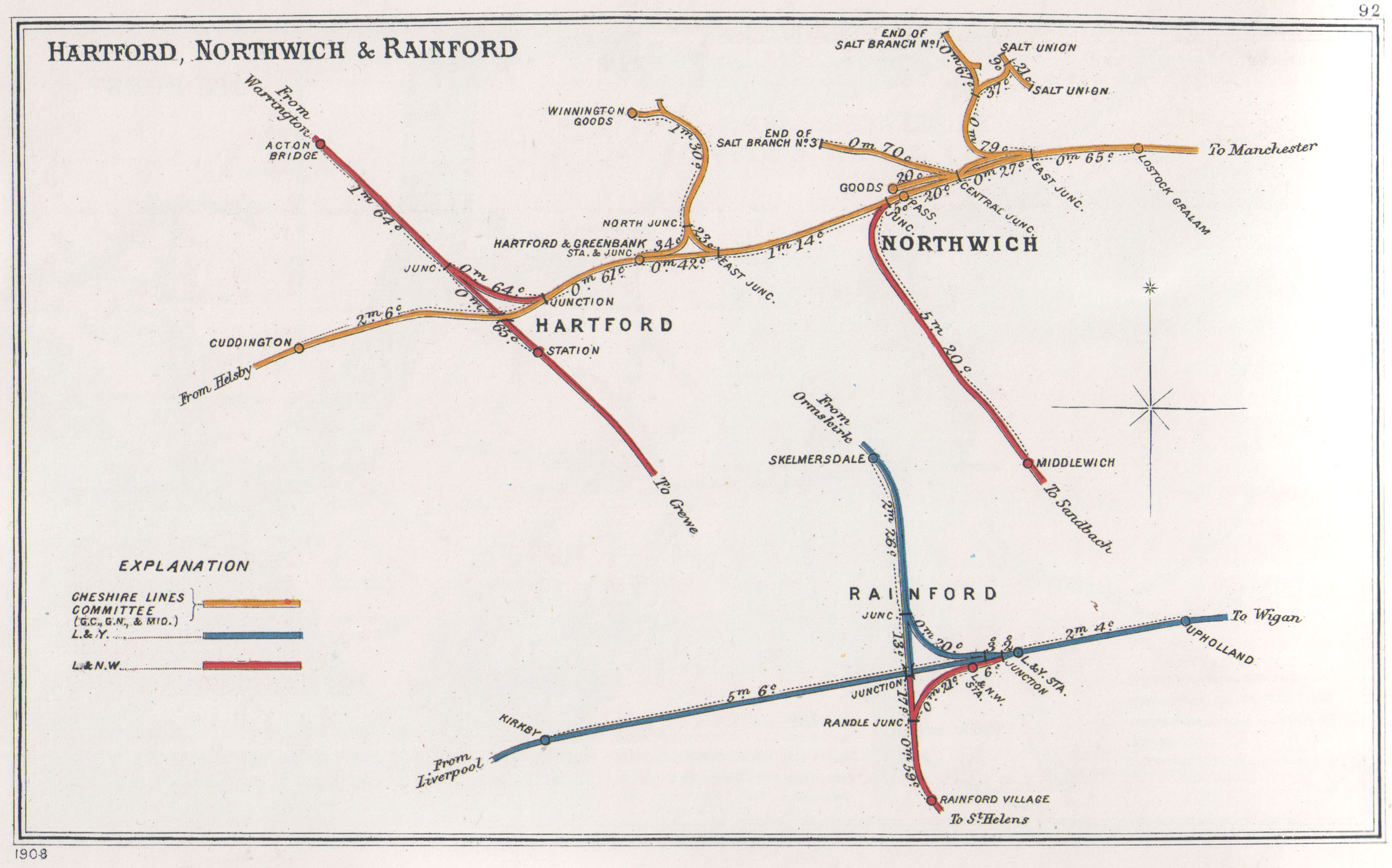
A 1908 Railway Clearing House Junction Diagram showing (lower right) railways in the vicinity of Upholland

The original Upholland station was on a different site, opened by the Liverpool and Bury Railway on 20 November 1848, but closed four years later in 1852. The current station was originally called "Pimbo Lane Station", and also opened on 20 November 1848. It was renamed "Up Holland" on 13 October 1900, and "Upholland" in 1902.

== Facilities ==
The station is unstaffed and has no permanent buildings left, other than basic shelters on each platform. Timetable posters provide train running information. Step-free access is available to the eastbound platform (via a steep ramp), but not for the westbound one (this can only be reached by a staircase from Pimbo Lane). The station also has a small car park located next to the bridge on Pimbo Lane.

== Services ==
All services at Upholland are operated by Northern Trains.

The station is served by one train per hour between Headbolt Lane and Blackburn via Wigan Wallgate and Manchester Victoria. Connections for Merseyrail services to and from Liverpool Central can be made by changing at Headbolt Lane.

No services call at the station during late evenings or on Sundays.

Preceding station	National Rail	Following station
Rainford	Northern Trains Kirkby Branch Line Monday-Saturday only	Orrell
