= Liverpool and Bury Railway =

Railway line in England

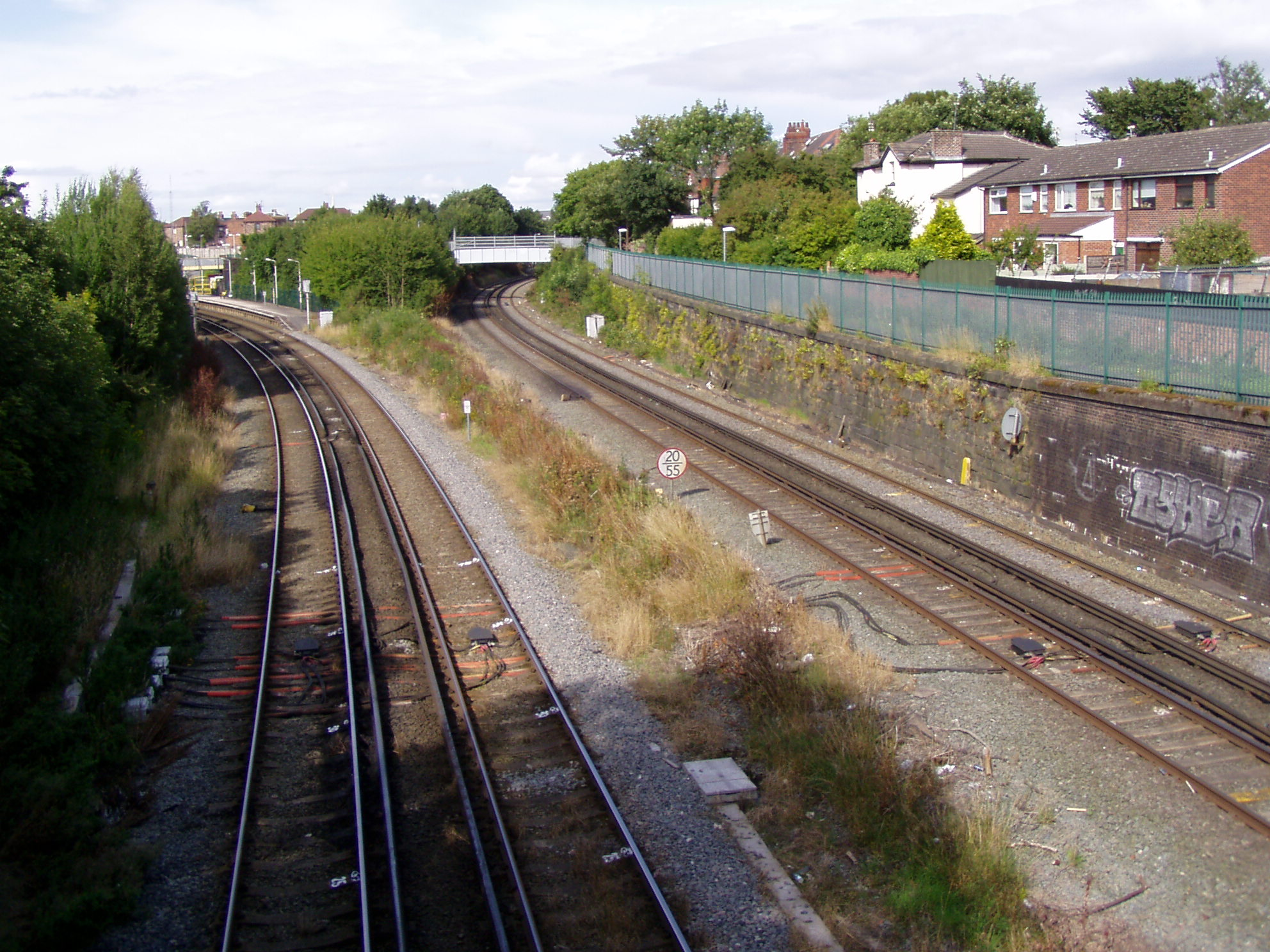
- LO&PR and L&BR diverge.

Overview
- Status: Operational
- Owner: Network Rail
- Locale: Lancashire; North West England

Service
- System: National Rail
- Operator: Northern Trains

Technical
- Track gauge: 4 ft 8 1/2 in (1,435 mm) standard gauge

The Liverpool and Bury Railway was formed by an act of Parliament in 1845 to link Liverpool and Bury via Kirkby, Wigan and Bolton, the line opening on 20 November 1848. The line became the Lancashire and Yorkshire Railway's main line between Liverpool, Manchester and Yorkshire. Most of it is still open.

== Formation and opening ==
Liverpool and Bury Railway Act 1845
- Act of Parliament
- Parliament of the United Kingdom
- Long title: An Act for making a Railway from Liverpool to Wigan, Bolton, and Bury, with several Branches therefrom.
- Citation: 8 & 9 Vict. c. clxvi

Dates
- Royal assent: 31 July 1845

Text of statute as originally enacted

In the 1840s travel by rail between Liverpool, Bolton and Wigan was possible but time consuming, and it depended on using the Liverpool and Manchester Railway (L&MR) who effectively had a monopoly on travel not only between Liverpool and Manchester but also to these industrial towns of the north west, Wigan via a connection on the North Union Railway, Bolton via a connection on the former Bolton and Leigh Railway (B&LR). (Note: On 8 August 1845 the B&LR became part of the Grand Junction Railway(GJR). The GJR then became part of the London and North Western Railway (L&NWR) on 16 July 1846 by amalgamation.) Local industrialists formed the Bolton, Wigan and Liverpool Railway Company in 1844 with the intention of breaking the L&MR monopoly, in 1845 they decided to include Bury in their plans and applied for legal powers, these were granted in the Liverpool and Bury Railway Act 1845 (8 & 9 Vict. c. clxvi) on 31 July 1845 and the Liverpool and Bury Railway was formed. (Note: An Act for making a Railway from Liverpool to Wigan, Bolton, and Bury, with several Branches therefrom.)

The act provided for a line starting near the borough gaol in Liverpool to a junction with the Bolton and Preston Railway (B&PR) near Lostock. (Note: The act said the junction was with the Bolton and Preston Railway but it had been acquired by the North Union Railway on 10 May 1844.)

Two branches were included in the act, one from near Upholland to Ormskirk, which was not constructed, and a branch from the Manchester and Bolton Railway at Bolton to a junction with the Manchester, Bury and Rossendale Railway at Bury. (Note: The act said the junction was with the Manchester, Bury and Rossendale Railway but it had recently, on 30 June 1845, amalgamated with the Blackburn, Burnley, Accrington and Colne Extension Railway to form the East Lancashire Railway.)

This second branch to Bury was already authorised to be extended onto Heywood where it connected with the Manchester and Leeds Railway (M&LR) forming a route through to Rochdale by the Manchester and Leeds Railway Act (No. 2) 1845 (8 & 9 Vict. c. liv) of 30 June 1845. (Note: An Act for amending the Acts relating to the Manchester and Leeds Railway, and for making a Branch therefrom to Burnley, and for extending the Oldham and Heywood Branches.)

Liverpool and Bury Railway Act 1846
- Act of Parliament
- Parliament of the United Kingdom
- Long title: An Act for amending the Act relating to the Liverpool and Bury Railway, and for making Branches therefrom.
- Citation: 9 & 10 Vict. c. cccxii

Dates
- Royal assent: 3 August 1846

The Liverpool and Bury Railway was acquired under the terms of the Manchester and Leeds Railway (No. 2) Act 1846 (9 & 10 Vict. c. cclxxxii) on 27 July 1846 by the Manchester and Leeds Railway (Note: An Act to incorporate the Liverpool and Bury Railway Company with the Manchester and Leeds Railway Company.) who needed no persuasion in acquiring a route to Liverpool. At the same time as the amalgamation act was passed, the railway also had authorised by the Liverpool and Bury Railway Act 1846 (9 & 10 Vict. c. cccxii) to construct an extension into Liverpool to a station near Exchange Square, the extension was not allowed to pass within 15 ft (4.6 m) of the borough gaol and a 700 ft (210 m) wall was to be erected to prevent railway passengers seeing into the gaol. (Note: An Act for amending the Act relating to the Liverpool and Bury Railway, and for making Branches therefrom.)

In August 1846 the Liverpool, Ormskirk and Preston Railway (LO&PR) secured an act of Parliament, the Liverpool, Ormskirk, and Preston Railway Act 1846 (9 & 10 Vict. c. ccclxxxi), for a line between those towns which included the making of the line joint with the L&BR from Walton Junction to the Liverpool terminus, the terminal station itself and the proposed extension to the new terminus at Tithebarn Street. The act also included a branch from near Kirkdale to Liverpool docks. The LO&PR was required to pay the L&BR half of the cost for this joint venture. The act also allowed for the LO&PR to be leased or sold to the East Lancashire Railway (ELR) and this happened in October 1846. (Note: An Act for making a Railway from the Liverpool and Bury Railway to the North Union and Blackburn and Preston Railways, with Branches therefrom, to be called "The Liverpool, Ormskirk, and Preston Railway.")

The Manchester and Leeds Railway amalgamated with others to become the Lancashire and Yorkshire Railway on 9 July 1847, under the Manchester and Leeds Railway Act (No. 3) 1847 (10 & 11 Vict. c. clxiii). (Note: An Act to enable the Manchester and Leeds Railway Company to make certain Branches, Extensions, and other Works, and to alter the Name of the Company.)

The line running from a temporary terminus at Liverpool Great Howard Street to the junction near Lostock, and the branch from Bolton to Bury were opened by the Lancashire and Yorkshire Railway on 20 November 1848, the section between Lostock and Bolton had been open since the 1841 opening of the Bolton and Preston Railway, it was double-tracked throughout. The line opened for goods traffic a month later than passengers whilst a wagon hoist was installed at Liverpool.

The final section of the continuing route from Bury to Heywood had been opened by the L&YR on 1 May 1848.

== Construction ==
A contract for building the whole line, less the viaduct required at Liverpool, was let on 5 November 1845 to William McCormick and William Dargan, the Liverpool viaduct contract was not let until 11 March 1846 and that went to William McCormick in conjunction with S. & J. Holmes, the line was to be complete by 1 July 1847 with penalties for lateness and bonuses for early completion. Work started at once and along the whole line and by May 1846 there were about 3,500 men and 200 horses at work.

There were some considerable civil engineering aspects to the line, the Liverpool viaduct was over a 1 mi (1.6 km), had 117 brick arches 30 ft (9.1 m) high and contained over 26 million bricks. On 23 March 1847 twenty-one of the arches collapsed, setting back the work and adding expense. Walton tunnel whilst 1,149 yd (1,051 m) long presented no problems as it was dry. Upholland tunnel at 959 yd (877 m) went through coal measures and rock and proved to be very wet and troublesome requiring pumping.

At Rainford the line went for 2 mi (3.2 km) over a moss (similar to Chat moss which the Liverpool and Manchester Railway had to cross) which had to be excavated to a depth of 26 ft (7.9 m). There was a 2 mi (3.2 km) long and 40 ft (12 m) high embankment at Pemberton, 65 ft (20 m) long bridges were needed to cross the Leeds and Liverpool Canal, at Kirkdale and again near Wigan, Wigan was approached via a timber viaduct consisting of forty-five 30 ft (9.1 m) spans and the NUR's Springs branch also needed a timber viaduct 25 ft (7.6 m) high to cross it. Further along the line a 700 ft (210 m) long viaduct crossed the river Croal and the Manchester, Bolton & Bury Canal, the Tonge valley was crossed by an 86 ft (26 m) high viaduct and at Bury there was a stone viaduct of five spans of 73 ft (22 m) each.

== Description ==
From the joint L&YR/ELR station at Liverpool Great Howard Street/Liverpool Borough Gaol (Note: Both railways called their terminus Liverpool but in 1850 the L&YR started to call it Liverpool Borough Gaol, and the ELR called it Liverpool Great Howard Street to avoid confusion with the about to be opened Liverpool Exchange.) the joint line ran northwards through Bootle Lane (later became Kirkdale) to Walton Junction where the ELR line to Ormskirk and Preston which was under construction branched off, the line to Bury veering eastwards, immediately after the junction was Preston Road (which later became Rice Lane) then Simonswood (which later became Aintree then Fazakerley) to Kirkby. Rainford was next followed by Pimbo Lane (later became Upholland) and Upholland which only lasted a short time until 1852 before being replaced by Orrell just over 1 mi (1.6 km) further along the line, then came Pemberton and into the first Wigan station.

The 3 miles (4.8 km) through Wigan were built in conjunction with the Manchester and Southport Railway as they would both be using it. There were two stations on this section, Wigan and Hindley.

Shortly after Hindley the line veered northwards at what would later become Crow Nest Junction when the Manchester and Southport Railway finished its line to Manchester in 1888. Westhoughton came next followed by a short-lived Chew Moor and then to Lostock Junction where the line met the existing North Union Railway (former Bolton and Preston Railway) line into Bolton Trinity Street.

Darcy Lever was the first station after Bolton, then Bradley Fold, Black Lane and Bury Knowsley Street. At Bury the line made an end-on connection with the extension from Heywood that had opened on 1 May 1848.

Stations that opened later were North Docks (later became Sandhills) in 1854 and Ince on 1 June 1863.

== Extension into Liverpool ==
When the line opened northwards from Liverpool Borough Gaol/Liverpool Great Howard Street terminus it was already known that this station would only be temporary as the Liverpool and Bury Railway Act 1846 (9 & 10 Vict. c. cccxii) authorising the extension of the railway further into Liverpool had already been given royal assent.

Just to the south of the original joint terminus the London and North Western Railway (L&NWR) had built a branch at a lower level into Waterloo Goods station, the extension had to cross these lines and did so via a bridge described as a huge brick arch 150 ft (46 m) in span and wedge-shaped in plan 135 ft (41 m) wide at the north end and 200 ft (61 m) wide at the south end, on a level with the passenger station and about 60 ft (18 m) above the L&NWR lines, this was designed by John Hawkshaw, the chief engineer of the L&YR.

From the south end of the great brick arch the line curved eastwards around the wall of the borough gaol, crossed the Leeds and Liverpool Canal and then rose to the new terminus where the tracks were 25 ft (7.6 m) above Tithebarn Street, the height being necessary to keep open the canal and several streets passing beneath.

The two-storied station building faced onto Tithebarn Street and rose to 90 ft (27 m) above street level with separate facilities for the two companies, the L&YR occupying the west side. The station had one arrival platform shared by the occupants who had two departure platforms each, the station opened on 13 May 1850.

The approaches to the station were improved in the 1880s by the building of a loop line over a diverted Leeds and Liverpool canal, the station itself was completely rebuilt and enlarged to ten platforms, fully re-opening on 2 July 1888.

== North Docks branch ==
The Liverpool, Ormskirk, and Preston Railway Act 1846 (9 & 10 Vict. c. ccclxxxi) enabled building of a branch from near Kirkdale to Liverpool docks. The Manchester and Leeds Railway (No. 2) Act 1847 (10 & 11 Vict. c. ciii) allowed for the goods branch to become jointly owned, for a price, and this took place in 1848 between the L&YR (successors to the M&LR) and the ELR (successors to the LO&PR).

Plans were drawn up and approved by both companies for the branch but no progress was made before the powers expired in 1853. In 1854 the L&YR applied for the same powers, plus some additional branches into other docks. These were granted in the Lancashire and Yorkshire Railway (Liverpool Dock Branches) Act 1854 (17 & 18 Vict. c. lviii), and this time the ELR was allowed to become joint owners, again having to pay for half of the cost, the ELR declined, was reimbursed some of its earlier expenditure and the L&YR proceeded alone. The branch opened on 26 March 1855. (Note: An Act for enabling the Lancashire and Yorkshire Railway Company to construct a Railway from Kirkdale to the Liverpool Docks, with connecting Lines there; and for other Purposes.)

From the junction, just north of Liverpool North Docks station (which later became Sandhills) the line descended on a long brick viaduct with iron spans over the streets and a plate-girder bridge over Great Howard Street. From here the line split with the left-hand branch continuing to descend to ground level and into North Docks Goods station where there were connections onto the Mersey Docks and Harbour Board (MDHB) rail network. The other branch ran via a vertical-lift bridge over Regent Road to two High-level coal branches in Bramley Moore and Wellington docks, maintaining the higher level of the line enabled coal to be delivered directly into ships using shutes.

The goods station dealt with a significant amount of imported Irish livestock, around 250 wagonloads a day for over 50 years until an outbreak of foot and mouth disease caused livestock to be diverted to Birkenhead and quarantined.

== North Mersey branch ==
The L&YR built this 4½ mile (7.2 Km) long double-track line to capture some of the increasing freight passing through the Canada Dock system in the north of the Mersey docks, opened in 1859. The line opened on 27 August 1866.

The line initially had no stations, terminating in the North Mersey goods yard where an end-on connection was made to the Mersey Docks and Harbour Board (MDHB) rail network. North Mersey goods railway station opened in 1866, a four-storey warehouse, loading mound and goods sheds was constructed between 1881 and 1884, the station was renamed to North Mersey and Alexandra Docks in 1892.

== Electrification ==
The L&YR introduced multiple-unit third-rail electric powered trains from Exchange station to Southport Chapel Street from March 1904, with a full service from 13 May 1904. (Note: Initially it was a four-rail system, but the fourth, centre rail, was gradually removed and the running rails used to return the current.) This meant the section from Exchange to Sandhills was electrified then. The electrification was subsequently extended to Ormskirk in 1913 meaning the electrification now extended to Walton Junction.

As part of the electrification work for the creation of Merseyrail, the line to Kirkby was electrified, as diesel multiple units were banned from operating in the new tunnels for safety reasons. In order to maintain a through service to the city, the section from Walton Junction to Kirkby was third-rail electrified, with the remainder of the line towards Rainford and Wigan remaining diesel operated. The station at Kirkby became the interchange point between the two, as electrification eastwards from Kirkby was deemed too expensive at the time. Electric operations commenced on 2 May of that year, along with the end of through running between Bolton/Wigan and Liverpool.

The interchange station changed in October 2023 when a new station at Headbolt Lane opened, this station is served on the Merseyrail side by a new fleet of battery operated trains.

== Other improvements ==
The lines from Walton junction into Liverpool were doubled which needed two new tunnels at Kirkdale, all four tracks being brought into use on 24 April 1904.

A new loop-line was constructed at Sandhills it was completed by 1889.

The L&YR widened the line to four-tracks through Hindley and from there opened a new loop line 3 mi (4.8 km) to Pemberton avoiding Wigan, the line opened for freight traffic on 1 May 1889 and to passenger traffic on 1 June 1889.

The bridge over the Leeds and Liverpool Canal just north of Sandhills was widened in 1911 and a large mineral depot opened at Redfern Street, between the canal and the line to Southport Chapel Street on the canal's north bank.

In 1946 one of the Victorian timber bridges on the line was replaced with the Adam Viaduct, the first prestressed concrete railway bridge in the United Kingdom.

== The line today ==
With the exception of the section from Bolton to Bury (closed on 5 October 1970, along with the continuation through to Castleton) and the closure of Liverpool Exchange station in 1977 the line is still in use. The Liverpool end of the line now runs as part of Merseyrail's Link Tunnel, with Moorfields having replaced Exchange station. Long-term aspirations are to extend Merseyrail to Wigan on this line.

The Wigan to Bolton section meanwhile is used by Manchester Airport to Southport and Southport to Manchester Victoria local services.

In January 2019, Campaign for Better Transport released a report identifying the line between Bolton and Bury which was listed as Priority 2 for reopening. Priority 2 is for those lines which require further development or a change in circumstances (such as housing developments).

In March 2020, a bid was made to the Restoring Your Railway fund to get funds for a feasibility study into reinstating the line between Bolton and Bury. This bid was unsuccessful however a resubmitted bid for the second round was successful.

== Bibliography ==
- Brown, Joe (2021). Liverpool & Manchester Railway Atlas. Manchester: Crécy Publishing. ISBN 9780860936879. OCLC 1112373294.
- Cadwallader, Jonathan; Jenkins, Martin (2010). Merseyside Electrics. Hersham: Ian Allan. ISBN 978-0-7110-3417-4.
- Clinker, C. R. (October 1978). Clinker's Register of Closed Passenger Stations and Goods Depots in England, Scotland and Wales 1830–1977. Bristol: Avon-Anglia Publications & Services. ISBN 0-905466-19-5. OCLC 5726624.
- Grant, Donald J. (2017). Directory of the Railway Companies of Great Britain (1st ed.). Kibworth Beauchamp, Leicestershire: Troubador Publishing Ltd. ISBN 978-1-78803-768-6.
- Marshall, John (1969). The Lancashire & Yorkshire Railway. Vol. 1. Newton Abbot: David & Charles. ISBN 978-0-7153-4352-4.
- Marshall, John (1970). The Lancashire & Yorkshire Railway. Vol. 2. Newton Abbot: David & Charles. ISBN 978-0-7153-4906-9.
- Marshall, John (1978). A Biographical Dictionary of Railway Engineers. David & Charles. ISBN 978-0-7153-7489-4.
- Quick, Michael (2023) [2001]. Railway passenger stations in Great Britain: a chronology (PDF). version 5.05. Railway & Canal Historical Society.
