= Pemberton railway station =

Railway station in Greater Manchester, England

Pemberton
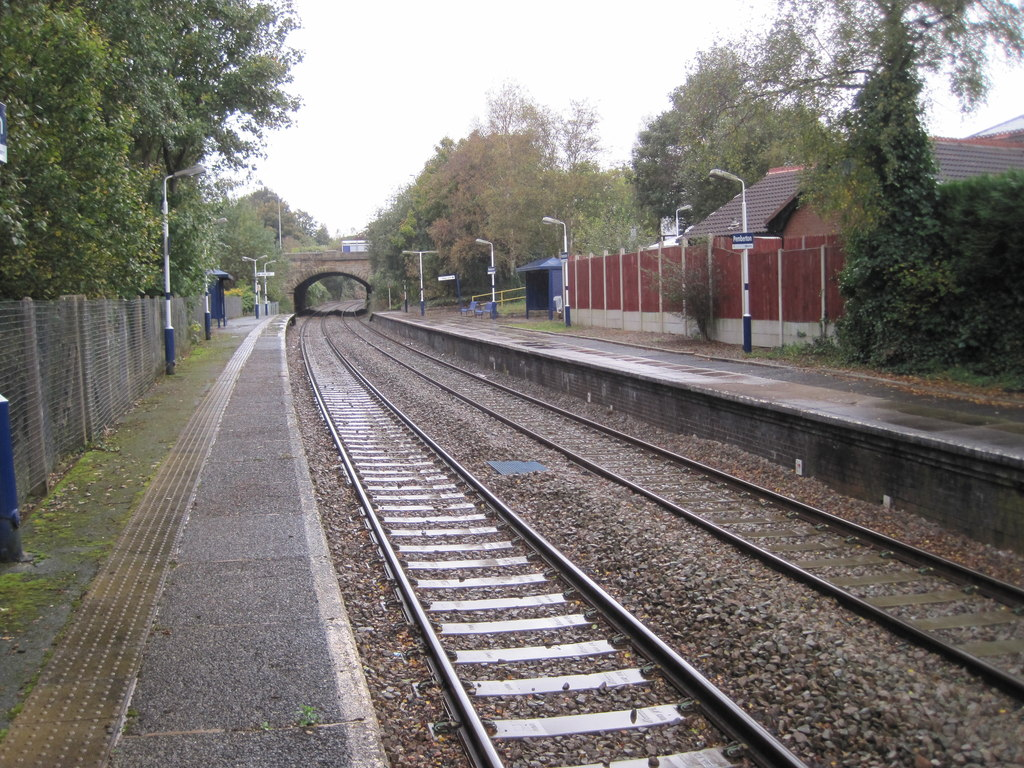
- Pemberton railway station in 2012

General information
- Location: Pemberton, Wigan; England
- Coordinates: 53°31′50″N 2°40′09″W
- Grid reference: SD557039
- Manager: Northern Trains
- Transit authority: Transport for Greater Manchester
- Platforms: 2

Other information
- Station code: PEM
- Classification: DfT category F2

History
- Original company: Liverpool and Bury Railway
- Pre-grouping: Lancashire and Yorkshire Railway
- Post-grouping: London, Midland and Scottish Railway

Key dates
- 20 November 1848: Station opened

Passengers
- 2021/22: ▲40,790
- 2022/23: ▼35,494
- 2023/24: ▲39,210
- 2024/25: ▲48,658
- 2025/26: ▲59,760
Location
Notes
- Passenger statistics from the Office of Rail and Road

Pemberton railway station serves the Pemberton area of Wigan in Greater Manchester, England. It is on the Kirkby branch line from Wigan Wallgate.

The station was opened on 20 November 1848 by the Liverpool and Bury Railway. It on the A571 Billinge Road. The platforms are at the bottom of two ramps (one on each side) which until recently was cobbled on the Kirkby bound platform. Once on the platform, the line underneath the bridge is obscured by overgrown trees.

Pemberton is served by major bus routes 601 and 602 operated by Bee Network as part of its Tranche 1 project with Go North West being awarded the contract for both those two services.

== Facilities ==
This station is unstaffed, however it is accessible via steep ramps from street level. There is no disabled access at this station. Step-free access is provided to both platforms.

Basic shelters are located on each platform, along with digital display screens and timetable poster boards.

(as of 2020) a self service ticket machine has been installed on the Wigan-bound platform. Passengers must purchase tickets from this machine using a debit or credit card before boarding a train. Passengers wishing to pay by cash must use the ticket machine to gain a Promise to Pay notice for their journey so that they can pay the fare with the on board conductor or at the destination station. This route has penalty fares in operation so failure to produce a valid ticket or Promise to Pay notice can result in you paying twice the amount of the original fare or £20.00 (whichever is greater).

== Services ==
All services at Pemberton are operated by Northern Trains.

The station is served by one train per hour between Headbolt Lane and Blackburn via Wigan Wallgate and Manchester Victoria. Connections for Merseyrail services to and from Liverpool Central can be made by changing at Headbolt Lane.

No services call at the station during late evenings or on Sundays.

Preceding station	National Rail	Following station
Orrell	Northern Trains Kirkby Branch Line Monday-Saturday only	Wigan Wallgate
