= Westhoughton railway station =

Railway station in Greater Manchester, England

Coordinates: 53.5558°N 2.5233°W

Westhoughton
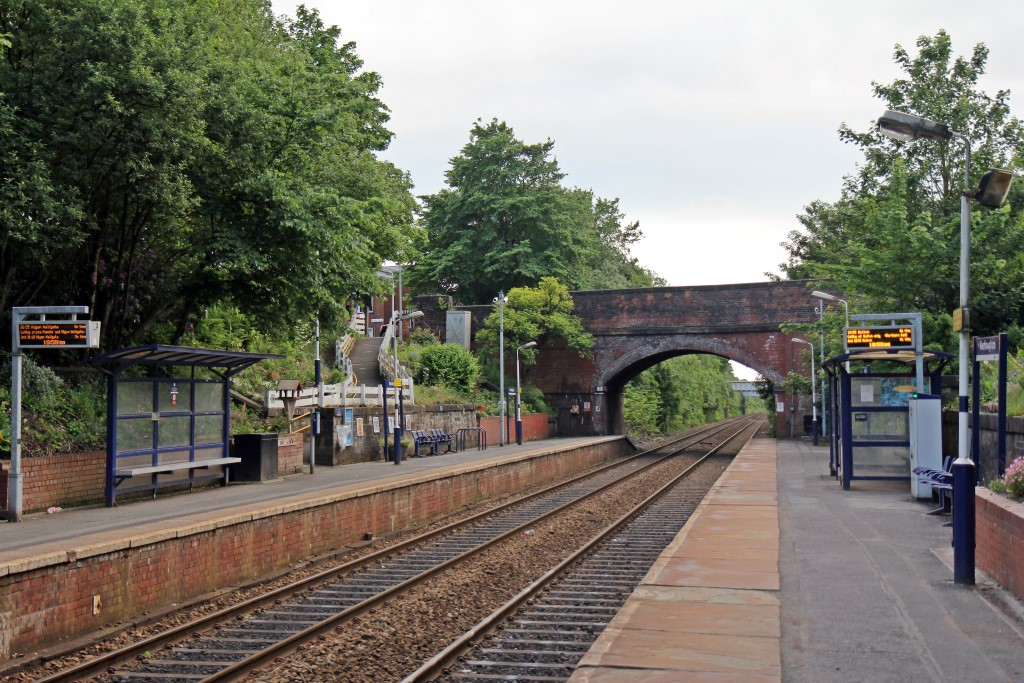
- Westhoughton railway station in 2015

General information
- Location: Westhoughton, Bolton; England
- Grid reference: SD654067
- Manager: Northern Trains
- Transit authority: Transport for Greater Manchester
- Platforms: 2

Other information
- Station code: WHG
- Classification: DfT category F1

History
- Opened: 1848

Passengers
- 2021/22: ▲0.165 million
- 2022/23: ▲0.180 million
- 2023/24: ▼0.164 million
- 2024/25: ▲0.166 million
- 2025/26: ▲0.198 million
Location
Notes
- Passenger statistics from the Office of Rail and Road

Westhoughton railway station is one of the two stations which serve the town of Westhoughton, in the Metropolitan Borough of Bolton, Greater Manchester, north-western England. The station is 15 1/2 miles (24.9 km) north west of Manchester Piccadilly.

== History ==
It is the only station on a line connecting the Manchester-Preston Line at Lostock Junction and the Manchester-Southport Line at Hindley near Wigan. It was opened in 1848, along with the line, by the Liverpool and Bury Railway, when the route between the two via Wigan and Bolton was completed. It subsequently became part of the Lancashire and Yorkshire Railway.

The station is in Church Street, about ten minutes walk from the town centre. Westhoughton is also served by Daisy Hill railway station, around 15 minutes on foot from the town centre, on the Manchester-Southport Line, via Atherton.

Unlike the town's other station at Daisy Hill, Westhoughton station has been unstaffed since 1974, when all the trackside and roadside buildings were demolished. This is despite the fact that Westhoughton enjoyed similar levels of patronage and at the time was the more likely of the two to remain open as the line through Daisy Hill was regularly threatened with closure or at the very least a reduction in the number of stations.From 2004 to 2012, passenger usage increased by 231%. The station's passenger usage seems set to grow further, as there has been considerable housing development on brownfield land, which was the site of a mine, within a few hundred yards of the station, as the town continues to grow as a commuter suburb.

In the late 1980s, Westhoughton very nearly had a new third station at Dobb Brow, and planning went as far as allowing the proposed station to appear on railway maps as "may open during the course of this timetable". At the last moment, however, plans were shelved. In 2000, these plans were revived, but did not come to fruition.

In 2008, unspecified development was planned for the station as part of GMPTE's plans to impose a congestion charge on drivers entering Manchester city centre at peak times, and use the funds raised to upgrade public transport provision. The scheme was dropped after the proposal was substantially rejected in a referendum.

== Location and facilities ==
There are neither toilets nor refreshment facilities, nor a payphone since 2011. A card-only ticket machine and "remote travel information" are provided by information screens and automated announcements on each platform.

Until 2013, The Commercial pub stood next door to the station, when it was closed and put up for sale.

Westhoughton station is approximately a fifteen-minute walk from Westhoughton town centre. Local buses 516, 520 and 521 stop outside the station entrance for connections to the town centre and also to Westhoughton's other station at Daisy Hill.

Access to the Bolton platform is by a long steep multi-stepped ramp and to the Wigan platform via a steep unstepped ramp. Access to both platforms has not been improved for those with prams, pushchairs or wheelchairs.

There is a large free car park with unsignposted access to the station.

The station is partly maintained by the Friends of Westhoughton Station, a voluntary group set up in 2012 with the aim of brightening up the station and providing floral displays.

== Services ==
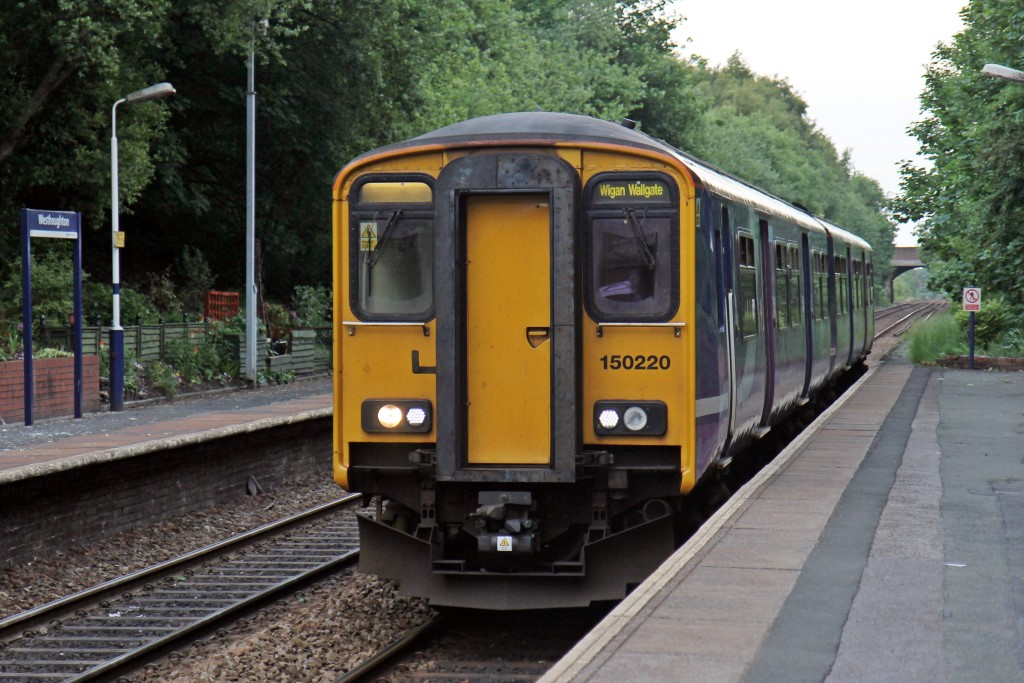
A Northern Rail Class 150 in 2015

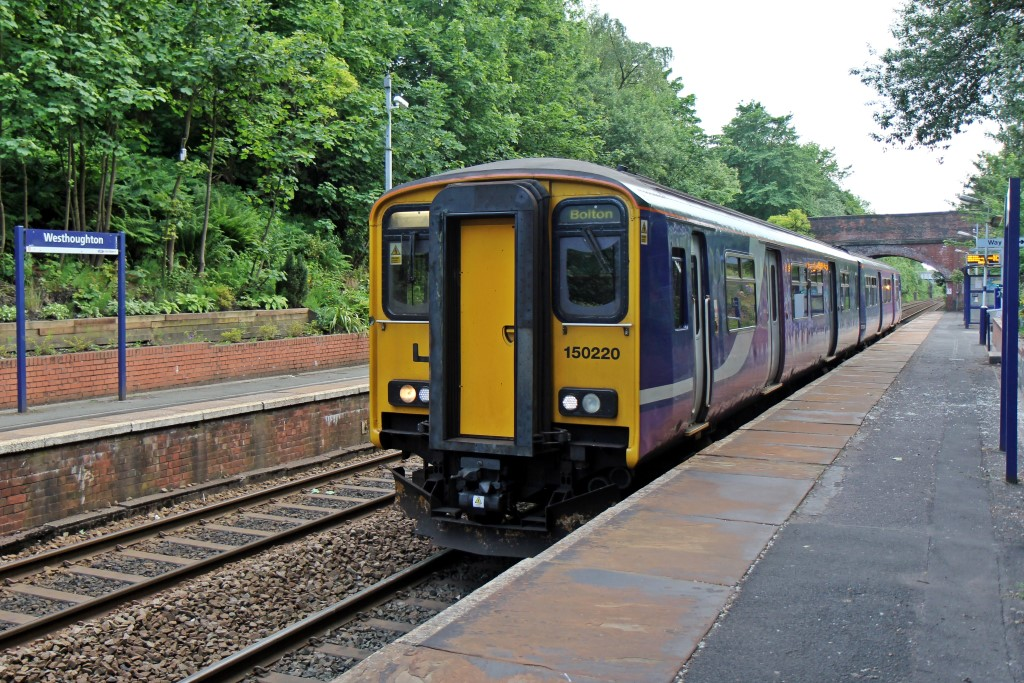
A Northern Rail Class 150 in 2015

For many years Westhoughton had an hourly service. Since the 1980s services have dramatically improved:

Since the December 2022 timetable change, the service pattern has been altered significantly. All westbound trains run to and from Southport, at a frequency of 2 trains per hour - this is not a clockface 30-minute timetable because of the different calling patterns between Salford Crescent and Bolton. Eastbound, there is one train per hour that runs semi-fast to Manchester Oxford Road and one per hour that calls at all stations to Stalybridge via Manchester Victoria - this includes the daily parliamentary service to and from Clifton. All services run via Bolton and Salford Crescent. There are no longer regular trains to Wigan North Western on weekdays - passengers must change at Wigan Wallgate if travelling to these destinations, although there are three trains to North Western later at night. On Sundays the train service has been indefinitely replaced by a 2-hourly replacement bus service between Wigan Wallgate and Bolton following Northern introducing an amended Sunday timetable in December 2024 owing to conductor shortages. Previously, an hourly service ran between Wigan North Western and Stalybridge. The service to Southport operates via Walkden on a Sunday. All services are operated by class 150 and 156 diesel multiple units and Class 769 bi-mode units, with one late evening service being operated by a Class 158 diesel multiple unit.

On weekends, trains were replaced by buses until the end of 2018 due to ongoing electrification work on the Preston - Bolton - Salford Crescent route (which ran significantly behind schedule).

Regular through services to Liverpool via Wigan Wallgate and Kirkby once operated via Bolton/Westhoughton, which originally formed part of the Liverpool & Bury Railway and also the Lancashire & Yorkshire Railway main line between Liverpool Exchange and Manchester, prior to the opening of the direct route through Swinton. However, since the western end of the route was electrified in 1978, Kirkby trains have either terminated at Wigan or been re-routed via Atherton.

Trains continuing to Bolton pass by, but cannot stop at, Lostock (Junction) station, as there are no platforms for the Wigan line. Passengers wishing to travel from Westhoughton to Preston and Blackpool must either change at Wigan Wallgate, usually crossing the road to Wigan North Western, a 100 yards walk, or via Bolton. Connections to London Euston can be made at Wigan, which is recommended as there is always only one change.

Between May and December 2015, the service pattern was altered temporarily due to the work being carried out to widen Farnworth Tunnel as part of the plans to electrify the Manchester to Preston Line. With only limited capacity south of Bolton, Manchester services were reduced to an hourly frequency, and curtailed at Bolton on Monday to Fridays, whilst weekend services were replaced by buses as Bolton station was also undergoing upgrade work for electrification. A peak hour bus shuttle to and from Daisy Hill was introduced to connect with those trains that had been diverted via Walkden, whilst westbound trains ran to Kirkby once again rather than Southport. This timetable ended in December 2015, when the line through Farnworth Tunnel was reopened.

== Upgrade and electrification ==
An upgrade and electrification to the railway line through the station was first announced in December 2013. It was officially announced as definitely going ahead on 1 September 2021. Electrification work started in December 2021, with the train service regularly being replaced by buses at weekends and a full nine-day closure of the line in early September 2024. The work was briefly suspended in 2023 following the main contractor entering liquidation, but a new contractor was appointed and work was completed by the end of 2024.

In January 2024 further improvements were planned for Westhoughton station, as originally only vegetation and platform extension works were planned for the station. The improvements now also include resurfacing and repainting of the platforms, installing tactile paving as well as the installation of toilet facilities at the station. The Friends of Westhoughton Station group are also seeking upgrades to the waiting facilities on platform one and for step-free access at the station.

The overhead wires were energised on 1 January 2025, with the first electric test train running between Wigan North Western and Bolton on the 4th of June. Electric service started in late July with Class 769 units to/from Southport changing power modes at Ince. The platforms at Ince, Hindley and Westhoughton stations have been extended to accommodate six-carriage trains, however all services continue to operate with either two or four carriages. Some services continue to operate with Class 150 or 156 diesel multiple units despite the route being electrified.

Preceding station	National Rail	Following station
Hindley	Northern Trains Southport/Wigan North Western - Stalybridge	Bolton Interchange
Hindley	Northern Trains Southport - Manchester Oxford Road (Monday - Saturday only)	Bolton Interchange
	Historical railways	
Hindley; Line and station open	Lancashire and Yorkshire Railway; Liverpool and Bury Railway	Chew Moor; Line open, station closed
