= Kirkby branch line =

Railway line in the North West of England

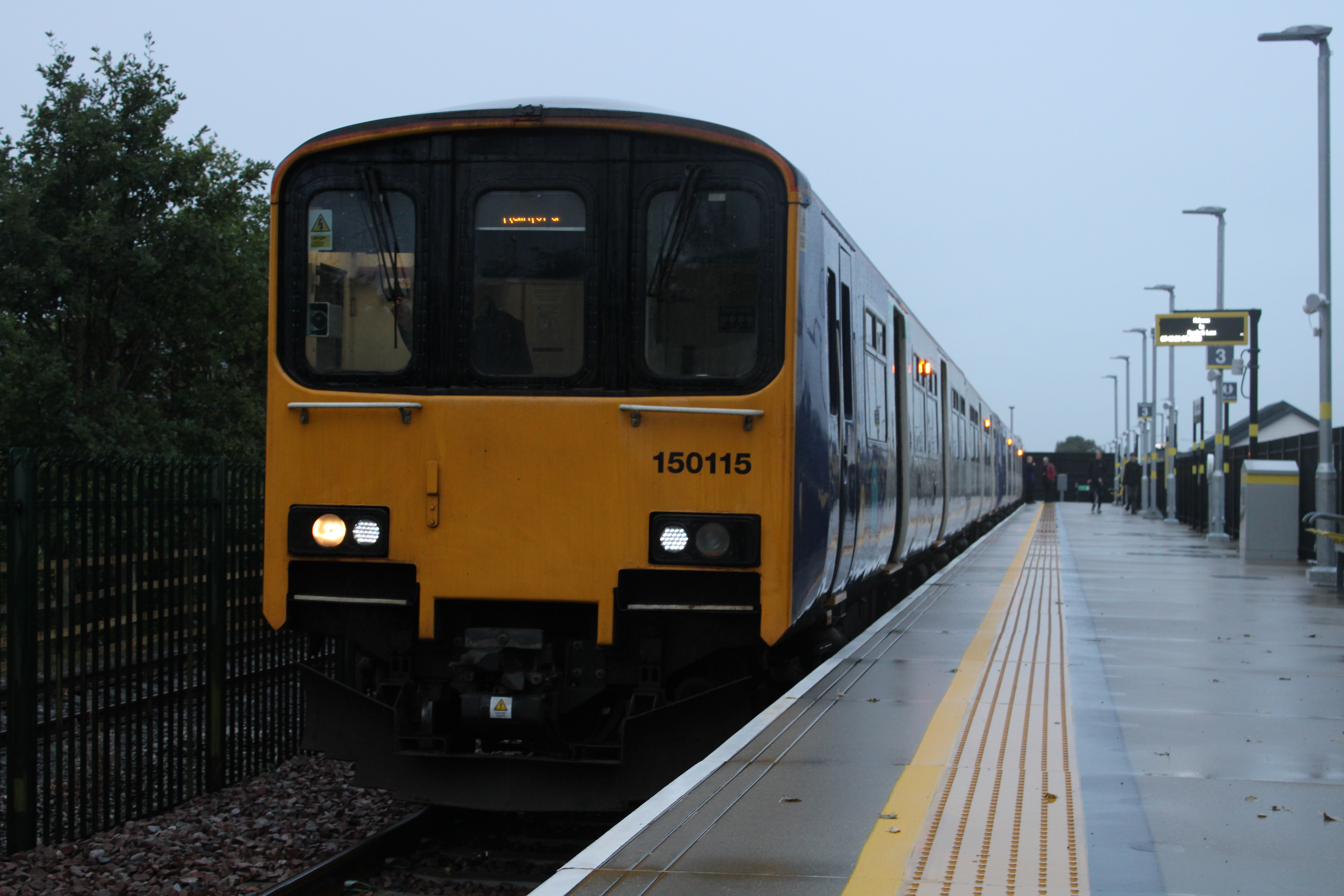
- A Northern Trains Class 150 at Headbolt Lane

Overview
- Status: Operational
- Owner: Network Rail
- Locale: North West England
- Termini: Wigan Wallgate; Headbolt Lane
- Stations: 6

Service
- System: National Rail
- Operator: Northern Trains

History
- Opened: 20 November 1848

Technical
- Line length: 12.25 miles (19.71 km)
- Track gauge: 1,435 mm (4 ft 8 1/2 in) standard gauge
Route map
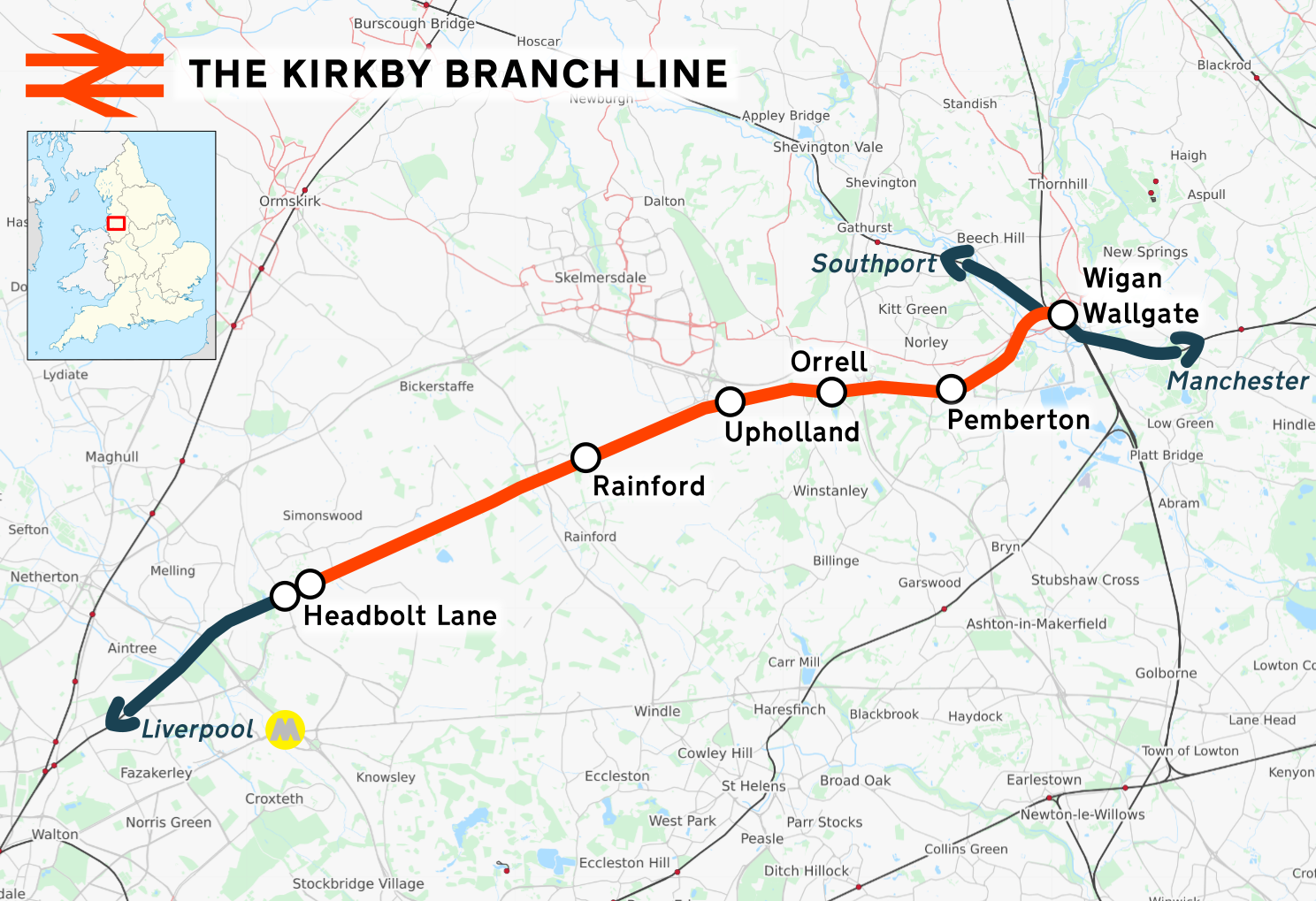
(Click to expand)

The Kirkby Branch Line is a branch railway line between Wigan Wallgate and Headbolt Lane. The line's original route was from Liverpool to Bury; later, the most northern of the Liverpool to Manchester lines was taken. The line was split at Kirkby in 1977, with the western section forming a high frequency branch of the electrified Merseyrail Northern Line, also referred to as the Kirkby branch line. The Kirkby branch to Wigan remained a one train per hour diesel-operated service by Northern Trains from Headbolt Lane to Blackburn, via Manchester Victoria.

== History ==
The Liverpool and Bury Railway built the first line into Liverpool from the north. It ran from Bury via the towns of Bolton and Wigan, reaching the city of Liverpool in 1848. Soon afterwards, the Liverpool, Ormskirk and Preston Railway's route to Preston was built sharing the L&BR line as far as Walton. Mergers meant that the Bury route was built by the Lancashire and Yorkshire Railway, which had taken over the Liverpool and Bury Railway company. The opening ceremony took place on 20 November 1848.

With the creation of the Merseyrail metro and the closure of the route's former terminus at Liverpool Exchange in 1977, through trains to Liverpool from the Wigan direction ceased. It had originally been intended that the line be electrified all the route from Liverpool to Wigan creating a terminal of the Merseyrail Northern Line at Wigan Wallgate. Wigan North Western is a terminal of Merseyrail's City Line. Only the section between Liverpool and Kirkby was electrified in 1977, as a part of the Merseyrail scheme. Kirkby station was reconstructed as a terminus for Merseyrail's Northern Line Kirkby branch and the Manchester to Kirkby line. Services between Wigan and Kirkby were provided by diesel-powered trains. Passengers from the Manchester direction continue beyond Kirkby into Liverpool change at Kirkby, joining a Merseyrail-operated electric metro train. It is a long-term aspiration of Merseyrail to complete the electrification of the Northern Line to Wigan. Merseytravel also hope to use the route as part of rail link to the town of Skelmersdale, which has been cut off from the national network since 1956 and is now one of the largest towns in North West England without a passenger rail service.

Proposals to extend Merseyrail's Northern Line to a new terminal station at Headbolt Lane, between Kirkby and Rainford, were announced in 2007 but did not receive funding until 2019. Headbolt Lane station became the new terminal interchange between trains from Liverpool and Wigan/Manchester when it opened on 5 October 2023.

== Route description ==
The former main line is now "something of a backwater", with the appearance of a rural branch line in places.

- After leaving Wigan Wallgate, trains pass under the West Coast Main Line almost immediately, after which the Southport-bound Manchester to Southport Line diverges to the west.
- A series of bridges take the branch line over the River Douglas and the Leeds and Liverpool Canal this includes the Adam Viaduct - the first prestressed concrete railway bridge in Britain.
- The line reaches Pemberton station, where a now-removed loop line came in on the east side. This rejoined the line to Bolton east of Wigan, avoiding the latter town.
- The line then passes under the M6 motorway and the 959-yard (877 m) Upholland Tunnel, via Orrell. The tunnel is situated at the highest point of the line and is the only major structural work on the route.
- Upholland is next, followed by Rainford. Until the 1950s, there was a junction for two passenger lines: one, the Skelmersdale branch, ran north-westwards towards Skelmersdale and Ormskirk; the other ran to St Helens via Crank. The lines were both opened in 1858, although not at the same time and were usually operated as a through route. The Ormskirk line was built by the East Lancashire Railway, while the St Helens Railway was responsible for the line to that town. Both survived until the 1960s for freight traffic.
- The line becomes single-track after Rainford, and continues for 5 1/4 miles (8.4 km) to the single platform at Kirkby but, from October 2023, now terminates at Headbolt Lane instead. The section from Headbolt Lane to Kirkby is now double tracked from just north of Kirkby station to Headbolt Lane and become part of Northern Line, without a direct connection to Rainford. There is a rail-connected freight terminal on this section, serving the Potter Logistics depot at the Knowsley Industrial Park near Kirkby. Regular traffic from this facility resumed in July 2016, after a prolonged period of disuse (services having previously ceased in 2006).

== Service ==
Northern Trains operates an hourly service on the Kirkby branch. Trains operate between Blackburn and Headbolt Lane, via Accrington, Burnley Manchester Road, Todmorden, Rochdale, Manchester Victoria, Salford Central, Atherton and Wigan Wallgate. Services are scheduled to take around 140 minutes end-to-end.

The service frequency has been unchanged since the 1980s; however, the high-level output specification for 2014-2019 envisaged the service being cut back to a simple shuttle between Kirkby and Wigan Wallgate. Network Rail has considered the effects of electrification.
