= Orrell railway station =

Railway station in Greater Manchester, England

Orrell
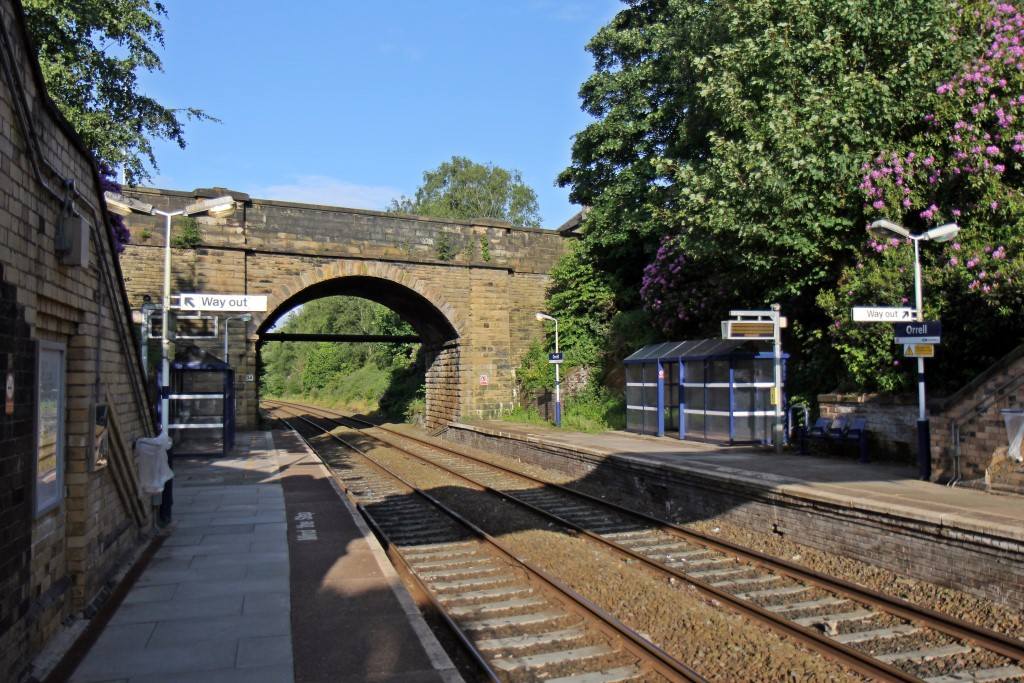
- Orrell railway station in 2015

General information
- Location: Orrell, Wigan; England
- Coordinates: 53°31′48″N 2°42′32″W
- Grid reference: SD531039
- Managed by: Northern Trains
- Transit authority: Transport for Greater Manchester
- Platforms: 2

Other information
- Station code: ORR
- Classification: DfT category F1

History
- Opened: 1848

Passengers
- 2020/21: ▼20,324
- 2021/22: ▲73,454
- 2022/23: ▼73,106
- 2023/24: ▲77,698
- 2024/25: ▲97,674
Location
Notes
- Passenger statistics from the Office of Rail and Road

Orrell railway station serves the Orrell area of the Metropolitan Borough of Wigan, Greater Manchester, England. It is a small two-platform commuter hub on the Kirkby branch line from Wigan.

From Orrell, trains provide services to Manchester, passing through Wigan's Wallgate station. On the opposite platform, trains served by Northern Trains use the Tontine Tunnel onwards towards the Headbolt Lane terminus of this branch line.

The majority of passengers at Orrell use services to Wigan town centre and Manchester. The services to Manchester are significantly busier than those to Kirkby. Usage figures are slightly inflated by the fact that Orrell is the boundary for free Concessionary travel for Manchester residents; pensioners book (free) to Orrell and need only pay from there to areas outside Greater Manchester.

== Facilities ==
The station is unstaffed and has a ticket machine that can be found at street level. Shelters, digital information screens and timetable information boards are located on each platform, with a footbridge linking them. No step-free access is available, as the station is situated in a cutting below street level and can only be reached via the stairs from the footbridge.

== Services ==
All services at Orrell are operated by Northern Trains.

The station is served by one train per hour between Headbolt Lane and Blackburn via Wigan Wallgate and Manchester Victoria. Connections for Merseyrail services to and from Liverpool Central can be made by changing at Headbolt Lane.

No services call at the station during late evenings or on Sundays.

Preceding station	National Rail	Following station
Upholland	Northern Trains Kirkby Branch Line Monday-Saturday only	Pemberton
