= Adam Viaduct =

Grade II listed railway underbridge in Wigan, England

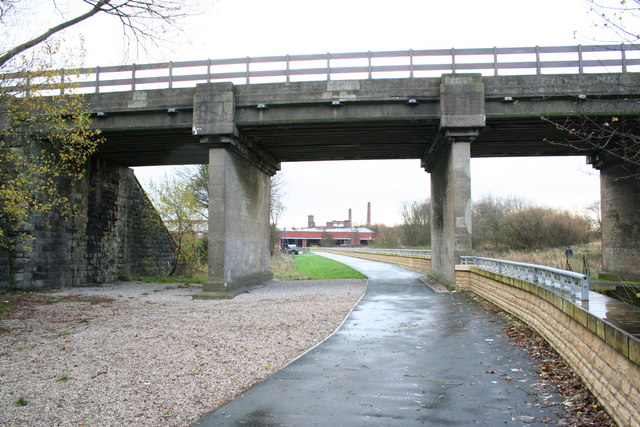
- A view of the viaduct before the construction of the Southgate road.
- Coordinates: 53°32′28″N 2°38′52″W
- Carries: Kirkby branch line
- Crosses: River Douglas, A49 Southgate link
- Heritage status: Grade II listed building

Characteristics
- Material: Prestressed concrete
- Total length: 120 feet (37 m)
- Width: 29 feet 9 inches (9.07 m)
- No. of spans: 4

Rail characteristics
- Track gauge: 4 ft 8 1/2 in (1,435 mm) standard gauge

History
- Designer: William Kelly Wallace
- Engineering design by: London, Midland & Scottish
- Constructed by: Leonard Fairclough Ltd
- Construction end: May 1946
- Replaces: 1847 timber bridge of the same name

The Adam Viaduct is a grade II listed concrete underbridge in Wallgate, Wigan. The bridge, constructed in 1946, is the earliest 'post-tensioned' prestressed concrete railway bridge in the United Kingdom, with only some examples in Switzerland being earlier. It is bridge number 54 on the Kirkby branch line and is at a line distance of 18 miles 1,032 yards (29.91 km).

== History and construction ==
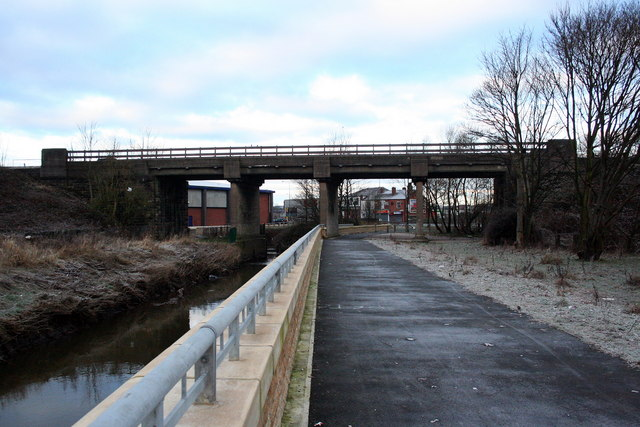
Another view of the Adam Viaduct

The bridge was constructed as a test case, to see if prestressed concrete construction was feasible for rail projects in the UK, by the LMS railway company, and designed by their chief civil engineer William Kelly Wallace. The beams used were prestressed using the Freyssinet system, in which concrete is precast with stressed high-tensile-strength metal tendons, which consist of multiple steel wires, running down the length of them. In construction, the beams internal rods are tightened and tied together so, under live load, they act as one. The LMS developed this system in the 1930s, and prestressed beams were first used for emergency repairs during World War II, but the Adam Viaduct first to use them for a full-scale project. The benefits of the system were found to be that it was quicker to install, more economical and longer-lasting, and with the bridge being less lively than traditional designs.

The bridge has six I-beams for each track and two beams for each parapet, and they are 2 feet 8 inches (0.81 m) deep. It was erected in 1946 on the foundations of an earlier Victorian bridge, created as part of the Liverpool & Bury Railway in 1847, which was made from timber with masonry abutments. The earlier bridge was strengthened three times in: 1869, 1888 and 1906.

== Southgate ==
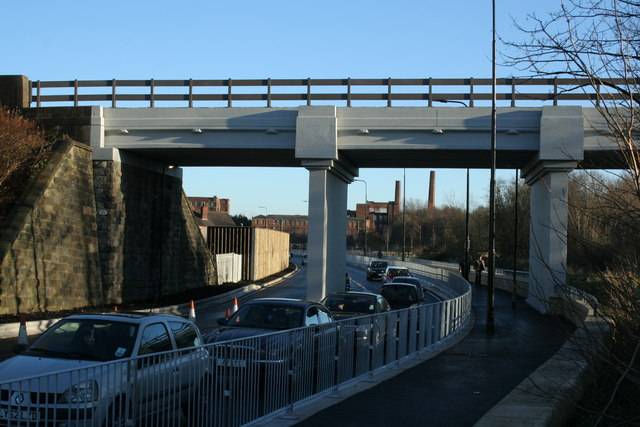
The bridge over the 2012 bypass

Southgate, a bypass of the A49 from Pottery Road and Saddle Junction, passes underneath the bridge and next to the River Douglas. The road, which officially opened in March 2013, was constructed to reduce traffic in the area.
