= Chew Moor railway station =

Former railway station in England

Chew Moor

General information
- Location: Chew Moor, Lostock, Bolton; England
- Coordinates: 53.5620°N 2.5084°W
- Grid reference: SD664073
- Platforms: 2 (probable)

Other information
- Status: Disused

History
- Original company: Liverpool and Bury Railway
- Pre-grouping: Lancashire and Yorkshire Railway

Key dates
- 20 November 1848: Station opened
- August 1852: Station closed
Location

Chew Moor railway station briefly served the village of Chew Moor, between Lostock and Westhoughton, England.

== History ==
The station was opened in 1848 by the Liverpool and Bury Railway. In August 1852 the company opened Lostock Junction station less than a mile to the north, rendering Chew Moor surplus to requirements.

== Location ==
Chew Moor station was situated immediately north of what is now the M61 overbridge across the line.

By 2016, no trace of the station could be seen. The double tracks through the site were in use as part of the Manchester to Southport Line and were planned to be electrified.

Preceding station	Disused railways	Following station
Westhoughton; Line and station open	Lancashire and Yorkshire Railway; Liverpool and Bury Railway	Bolton Trinity Street; Line and station open
