= William Kelly Wallace =

William Kelly Wallace CBE
- Born: 1883
- Died: 1969 (aged 85–86)
- Engineering career
- Discipline: Civil
- Institutions: Institution of Civil Engineers (president),

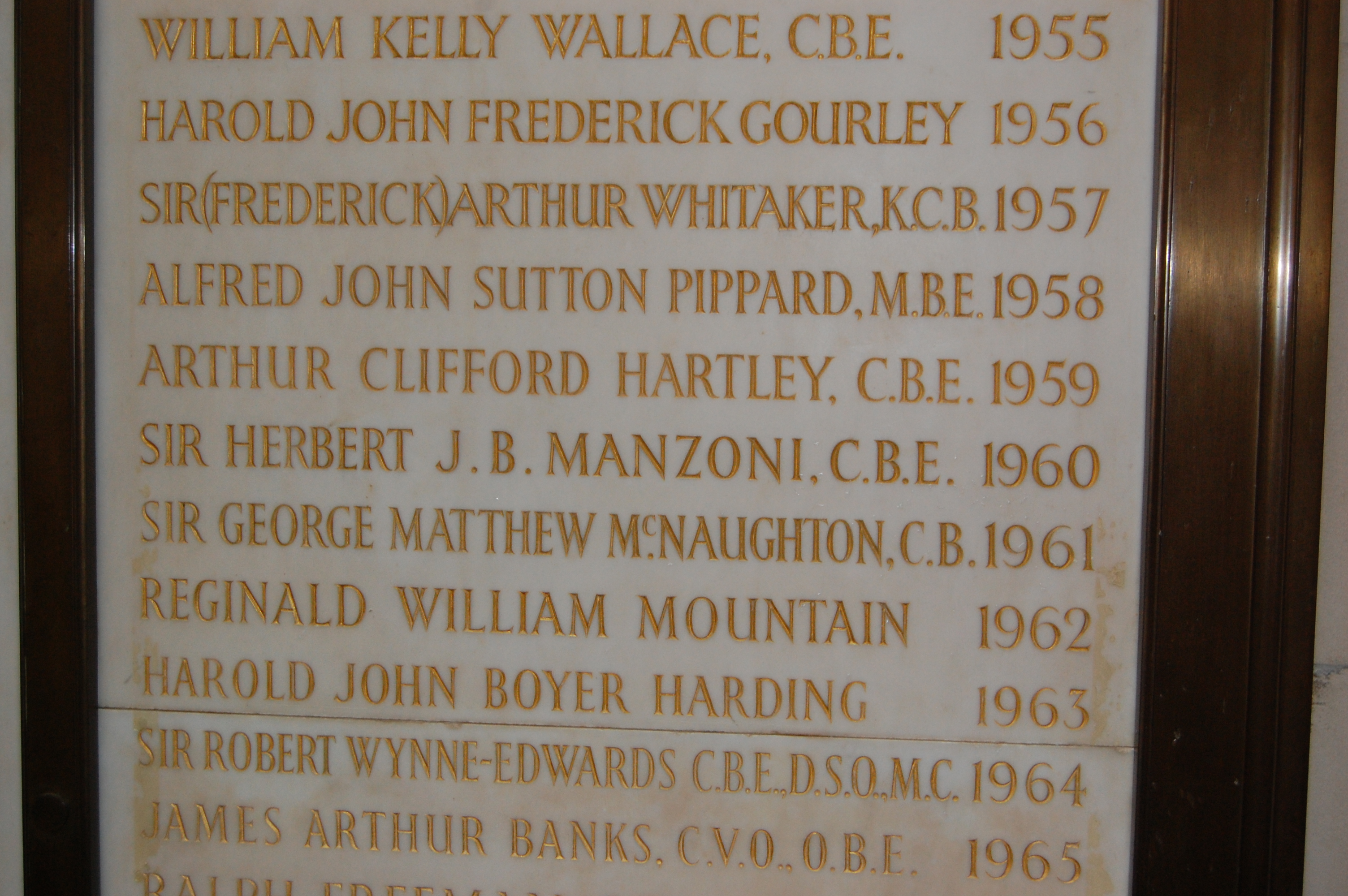
Wallace's name on the list of Institution of Civil Engineers presidents, at their One Great George Street headquarters

William Kelly Wallace CBE (1883–1969) was an Irish railway engineer who joined the Northern Counties Committee and later became Chief Civil Engineer of the London Midland and Scottish Railway (LMS). He was awarded a civil CBE in the 1946 New Year Honours.

== Biography ==
William Kelly Wallace was born in 1883 and educated privately. He joined the Midland Railway Northern Counties Committee (NCC) railway in Ireland in 1906, after three years of practical training. He gained knowledge as a railway engineering, particularly in bridges inspecting all 228 bridges from Belfast to Londonderry in 1910. In 1919 he an assistant engineer to Bowman Malcolm.

Although primarily a civil engineer, he was appointed to the joint positions of Locomotive Engineer and Civil Engineer on the NCC in 1922 when Bowman Malcolm retired. In 1924 he became chief engineer, a position he held till 1930.

In collaboration with the Manager, James Pepper, he initiated a renewal programme in which, not only were new locomotives built, but suitable classes of older locomotives would be "heavily rebuilt", in the main following the style of the Midland Railway and, later, the London Midland and Scottish Railway (LMS).

As Civil Engineer, Wallace took over the task of completing the new bridge across the River Bann at Coleraine, County Londonderry from Bowman Malcolm. This opened for traffic in March 1924. He oversaw the installation of colour light signalling at York Road station, Belfast which was commissioned in 1926. This was the first of its kind in Ireland and among the earliest large installations in the United Kingdom.

Wallace devised an innovative method of constructing reinforced concrete bridges using T-section pre-cast concrete beams carried on reinforced concrete piers. Four beams created the bridge deck on to which ballasted track could be directly laid.

In September 1930 he left the NCC to become Chief Stores Superintendent (Euston) on the LMS. In 1933 he became Chief Civil Engineer. Wallace was an advocate of British Standard track and flat-bottom rails and among the works he carried out were extensive trials of flat-bottom track with two types of baseplate on the former Midland and Caledonian mainlines. He also initiated an assessment of continuously welded rail (CWR). In 1946 he designed the Adam Viaduct, the first prestressed concrete railway bridge in the United Kingdom. In 1948 he left the railway service.

Wallace was known for having a dry sense of humour and was popular with his colleagues.

He was appointed President of the Institution of Civil Engineers for 1955–56, after being on its council and committees for 11 years. In 1949 he chaired the first meeting of its associated society, the British Geotechnical Society, and he received an honorary doctorate of science from Queen's University, Belfast in 1956.

William Kelly Wallace died in Surrey in May 1969.

Professional and academic associations
Preceded by David Mowat Watson	President of the Institution of Civil Engineers; November 1955 – November 1956	Succeeded by Harold John Frederick Gourley
