= Liverpool Great Howard Street railway station =

Former railway station in Liverpool, England

Liverpool Great Howard Street

General information
- Location: Liverpool, Merseyside; England
- Coordinates: 53.4156°N 2.9954°W
- Grid reference: SJ338914

Other information
- Status: Disused

History
- Original company: Lancashire and Yorkshire Railway & East Lancashire Railway
- Pre-grouping: Lancashire and Yorkshire Railway
- Post-grouping: London, Midland and Scottish Railway

Key dates
- 20 November 1848: Opened to passengers
- December 1848: Opened for freight
- 13 May 1850: Closed to passengers
- 30 September 1963: Closed
Location

Liverpool Great Howard Street was a railway station in Liverpool, Lancashire (now Merseyside), England; it was also known as Liverpool Borough Gaol. The station was jointly owned but separately operated by two rival railway companies from 1848 to 1850 when it became solely a goods station.

== Passenger station ==
The Liverpool and Bury Railway (L&BR) was formed in July 1845 to construct a line from Liverpool to Bury via Wigan and Bolton. The L&BR became part of the Manchester and Leeds Railway in July 1846 which in turn became the Lancashire and Yorkshire Railway (L&YR) in July 1847.

The line and station opened on 20 November 1848. As it was the terminus station the L&YR named the station Liverpool but in 1850 they started to call it Liverpool Borough Gaol, mostly to avoid confusion with the about to be opened Liverpool Exchange.

The Liverpool, Ormskirk and Preston Railway had been authorised in August 1846 to build a line between the towns in its name, it had been supported by the East Lancashire Railway (ELR) and amalgamated with it in October 1846.

The two companies, the L&YR and the ELR were serious rivals but they agreed to have their lines meet at Walton Junction and jointly share the cost of building a joint line into Liverpool to the temporary terminus and then the extension on to Liverpool Exchange.

The ELR line was opened on 2 April 1849 and the ELR named their part of the station Liverpool but in 1850 they started to call it Liverpool Great Howard Street, again mostly to avoid confusion with the about to be opened Liverpool Exchange.

The L&YR closed its part of the passenger station on 13 May 1850 when it transferred all its services to the new terminus at Liverpool Exchange.

The ELR started to use the new terminus on 13 May 1850 according to its opening announcement in the local paper but continued to have its trains stop at Great Howard Street as well. The timetable information in the same paper was still showing the departures as from Great Howard Street. Subsequent passenger timetables in the local newspapers gave departures as being from Liverpool without specifying which station was meant, (Note: For example the Liverpool Mail of 1 June 1850.) From June 1850 the local newspapers started to specifically show the departures as being from "the new station, Tithe-barn Street", the station probably closed to passengers about then.

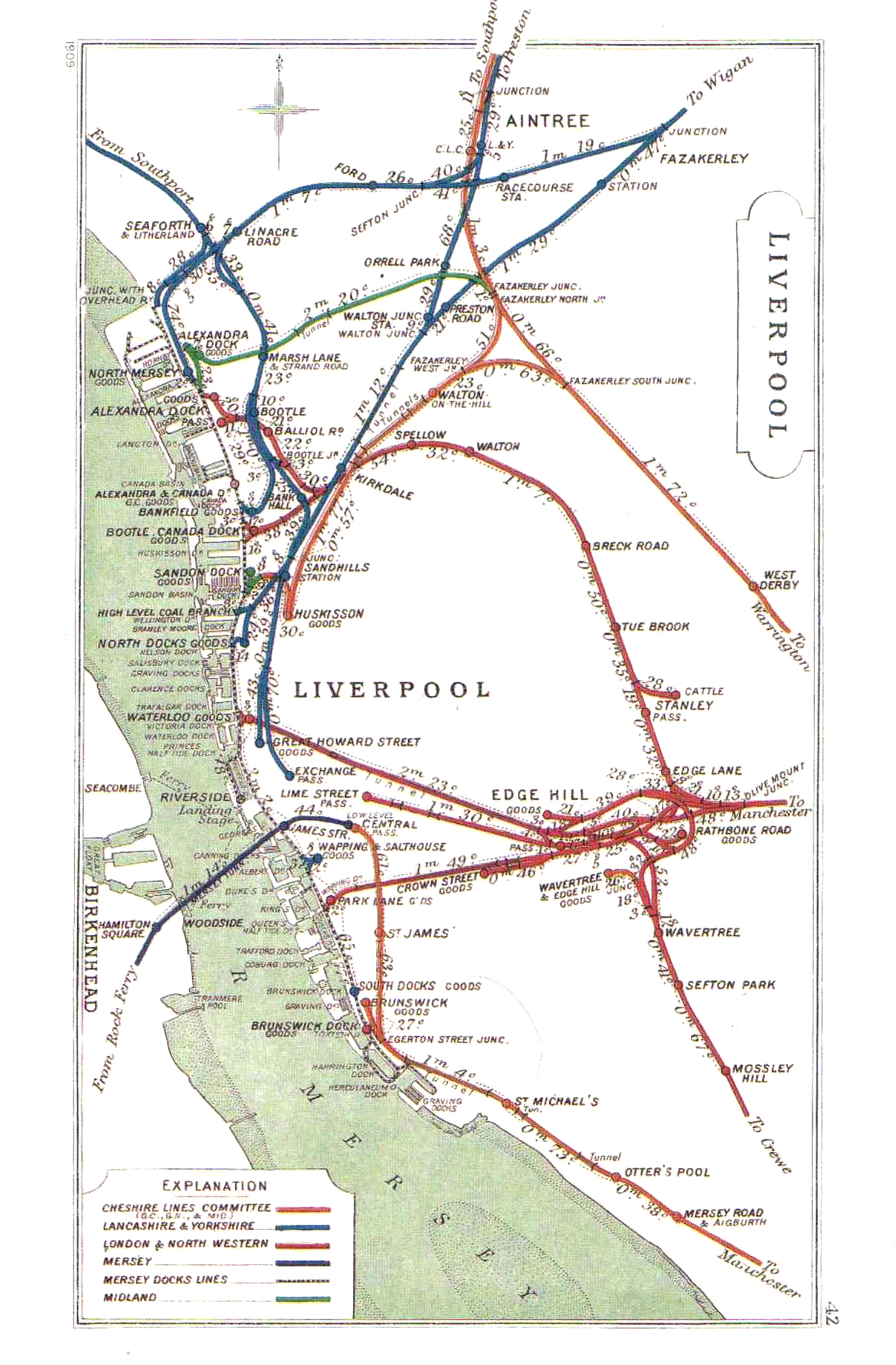
Liverpool RJD 42

The station was located on Great Howard Street opposite between Stuart Street (no longer in existence) and Oil Street, the station building was to the west of the line with Chadwick Street as its northern boundary.

Just south of the station, but at a lower level, the L&NWR opened a branch on 1 August 1849 to a large goods station at Waterloo, the Act authorising this branch, and the L&BR Act allowed for the L&BR to build over the L&NWR branch with the cost being shared by both companies.

To span the L&NWR branch John Hawkshaw, the chief engineer of the L&YR, designed two bridges, one, described as a huge brick arch 150 ft (46 m) in span and wedge-shaped in plan 135 ft (41 m) wide at the north end and 200 ft (61 m) wide at the south end, on a level with the passenger station and about 60 ft (18 m) above the L&NWR lines. The other bridge was a cast iron span of 150 ft (46 m) at ground level near the mouth of the L&NWR Waterloo tunnel.

== Goods station ==
The initial goods station opened a month later than passengers whilst a wagon hoist was installed.

In 1855 Walton gaol was opened making the Borough gaol redundant, from 1858 the L&YR leased the 1,881 square yards (1,573 square metres) site in perpetuity for an annual rent of two shillings (2s) and six pence (6d) per square yard. (Note: 2s 6d (£0 2s 6d) would be approximately £15 in 2024, or £28,215 per year for the site.) To access the site they constructed four wagon Hoists at the south end of the great arch and an incline down from the elevated line. The expanded goods station opened in March 1849.

The site was further expanded in 1852 when powers were obtained to close Love Lane round the south and east sides of the station. Two loading sheds were constructed in 1870.

The goods yard continued to expand until rails and wagon turntables led all over the place including northwards to an agricultural depot north of Chadwick Street, between Sprainger and Whitley Streets. In about 1876 the double-line approach from Sandhills was quadrupled by widening the viaduct. Freight services continued until closure on 30 September 1963.

== Bibliography ==
- Grant, Donald J. (2017). Directory of the Railway Companies of Great Britain (1st ed.). Kibworth Beauchamp, Leicestershire: Troubador Publishing Ltd. ISBN 978-1-78803-768-6.
- Holt, Geoffrey O.; Biddle, Gordon (1986). The North West. A Regional history of the railways of Great Britain. Vol. 10 (2nd ed.). David St. John Thomas. ISBN 978-0-946537-34-1. OCLC 643506870.
- Hurst, Geoffrey (1992). Register of Closed Railways: 1948-1991. Worksop, Nottinghamshire: Milepost Publications. ISBN 0-9477-9618-5.
- Marshall, John (1969). The Lancashire & Yorkshire Railway. Vol. 1. Newton Abbot: David & Charles. ISBN 978-0-7153-4352-4.
- Marshall, John (1978). A Biographical Dictionary of Railway Engineers. David & Charles. ISBN 978-0-7153-7489-4.
- Quick, Michael (2023) [2001]. Railway passenger stations in Great Britain: a chronology (PDF). version 5.05. Railway & Canal Historical Society.
