= Kirkby railway station =

Railway station in Merseyside, England

Kirkby
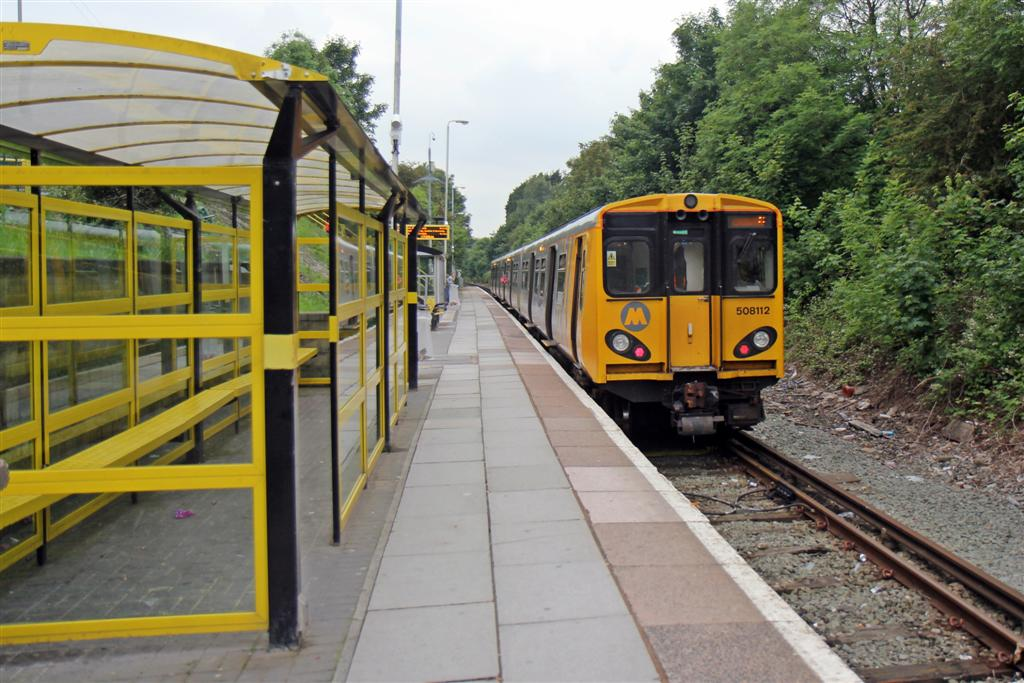
- A Class 508 unit occupies the platform

General information
- Location: Kirkby, Metropolitan Borough of Knowsley, England
- Coordinates: 53.4864°N 2.9025°W
- Grid reference: SJ402992
- Managed by: Merseyrail
- Transit authority: Merseytravel
- Platforms: 1

Other information
- Station code: KIR
- Fare zone: A3/C2/C3
- Classification: DfT category E

Passengers
- 2020/21: ▼0.878 million
- Interchange: ▼18,709
- 2021/22: ▲1.900 million
- Interchange: ▲48,029
- 2022/23: ▲2.061 million
- Interchange: ▼14,106
- 2023/24: ▼1.821 million
- Interchange: ▼163
- 2024/25: ▼1.605 million
- Interchange: ▲6,943
Location
Notes
- Passenger statistics from the Office of Rail and Road

Kirkby railway station serves the town of Kirkby, Merseyside, England. It is located 7.5 miles (12.1 km) north-east of Liverpool Central and is on the Headbolt Lane branch of Merseyrail's Northern Line. Until 2023, the station had been an interchange between Merseyrail services and Northern Trains services from Manchester Victoria, via Wigan Wallgate, when that function was extended to Headbolt Lane.

== History ==
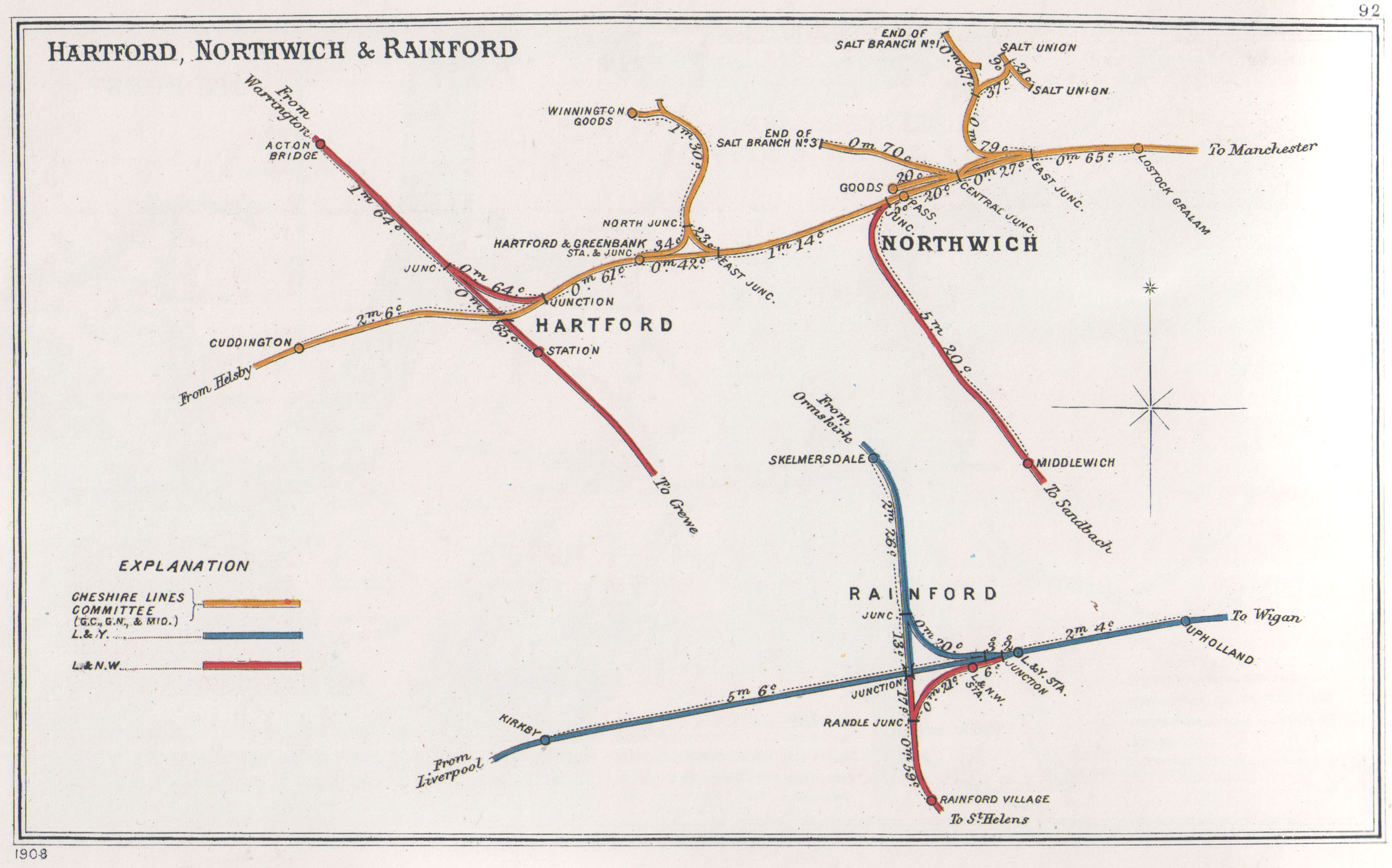
A 1908 Railway Clearing House junction diagram showing railways in the vicinity of Kirkby (lower right)

The original station was built in 1848, as part of the Liverpool and Bury Railway (later part of the Lancashire and Yorkshire Railway system). The station was situated on the eastern side of the bridge that bisects the site and consisted of two platforms. The L&BR subsequently became part of the main L&YR route between Manchester Victoria and Liverpool Exchange. Prior to the 1923 Grouping, it carried fast expresses between the two cities in addition to sizeable volumes of local passenger traffic and freight.

After the nationalisation of the railway network in 1948, the use of the line as a through Liverpool to Manchester route declined, but local commuter traffic levels remained significant. (Note: 19 trains per day each way ran along the line in 1965, though a few ran non-stop between Liverpool and Wigan.) Nevertheless, this did not stop the station and line from being listed for closure in the 1963 Beeching Report, along with the neighbouring Liverpool to Southport commuter line. The closure plans were subsequently rejected by the government in December 1967 and the station then became part of the newly created Merseyside Passenger Transport Executive's railway network in 1969.

=== 1970s rebuild ===
From 1970, the line through the station was singled to reduce track maintenance costs, with the Wigan-bound platform being taken out of use.

In 1977, the station was completely rebuilt as part of electrification work for the creation of Merseyrail. The closure of the terminus at Liverpool Exchange on 30 April 1977 and its replacement with new underground stations at Moorfields and Liverpool Central meant that diesel services which had served the station could no longer operate beyond Sandhills, as diesel multiple units were banned from operating in the new tunnels for safety reasons. In order to maintain a through service to the city, the section from Walton Junction to Kirkby was third-rail electrified, with the remainder of the line towards Rainford and Wigan remaining diesel operated. The station at Kirkby became the interchange point between the two, as electrification eastwards from Kirkby was deemed too expensive at the time. Electric operations commenced on 2 May of that year, along with the end of through running between Bolton/Wigan and Liverpool.

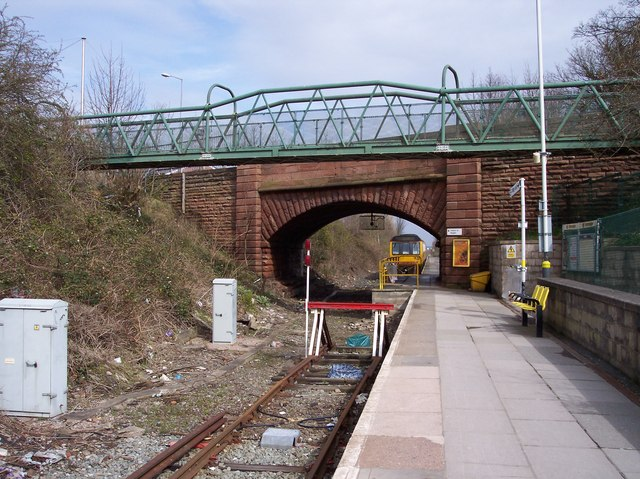
View of the former layout, where buffer stops separated the electrified Merseyrail track from the diesel line to Wigan beyond the bridge.

The rebuilt station consisted of a single platform on either side of the road overbridge, with a ticket office and waiting room at street level. The single track was retained, with a buffer stop stopping the trains from meeting. Passengers wishing to go from one service to another walked along the platform to move between trains (Note: A similar layout exists at Ormskirk.) This layout was adopted both to avoid the need for through travellers to change platforms when changing trains and for operational convenience – the single track lines to Fazakerley and Rainford facilitated the easy turnaround of trains here.

=== Extension to Headbolt Lane ===
As part of the second Merseyside Local Transport Plan, covering expansion of public transport in the region from 2006 to 2011) plans were drawn up for the expansion of the electrified line beyond Kirkby station. This included a new interchange facility at Headbolt Lane, where a station had been previously planned in the early 1970s but was not built. After a series of exploratory technical assessments and studies were carried out, construction of the new station was announced by the Liverpool City Region Combined Authority in August 2019, as part of a £172m funding package.

The development and construction of the new station saw a 0.75 miles (1.2 km) long section of line between the two stations being doubled, although single-line running was maintained through Kirkby station itself. With through-running restored, the platform east of the overbridge used by services to Wigan was taken out of use and access removed; Merseyrail trains travelling in both directions stop on the remaining single platform on the west side. The new layout came into service with the opening of Headbolt Lane in October 2023.

=== Accidents and incidents ===
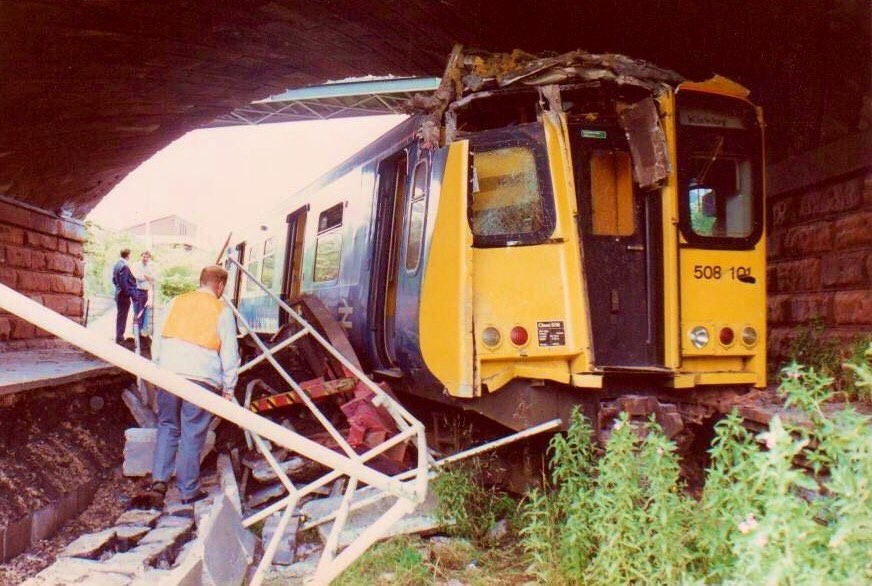
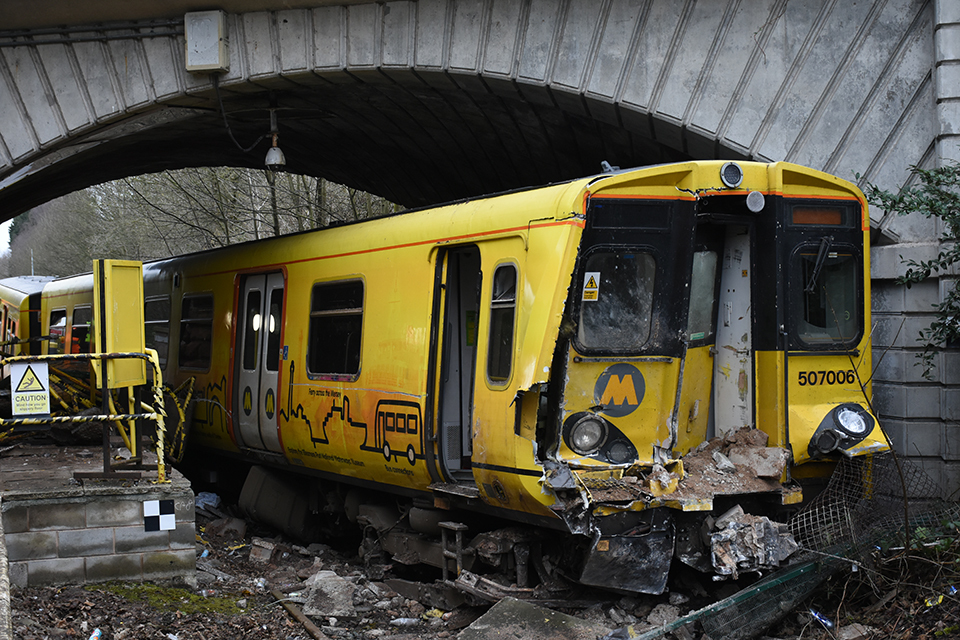
The aftermath of the 1987 (top) and 2021 (bottom) train crashes

On 27 June 1857, a goods train collided with an excursion train stopped at Kirkby. The goods train passed a signal at danger protecting the stationary passenger train, overrunning it by 238 yd (218 m). More than 200 people were injured, some of them severely. The driver and guard of the goods train were found to be at fault for the incident, having not reacted to an adverse signal in a timely fashion despite clear weather and good visibility. The report also found that the Lancashire and Yorkshire Railway had neglected to make best use of available safety measures.

When Kirkby was a terminus, the station had a history of trains colliding with the buffer stops. These included crashes before the installation of the Train Protection & Warning System (TPWS), in 1987, 1991 and 1997, and after TPWS was installed, in 2021. The latter accident caused £450,000 worth of damage to the station.

== Facilities ==
The ticket office is staffed throughout the day, from start of service until 00:30 seven days per week; a self-service ticket machine is also provided. There are shelters on the platform, along with digital display screens and timetable poster boards. Step-free access to the platform is available via a ramp. There is a 174 space car park and secure spaces for 20 bicycles.

== Services ==
The station is usually served by four trains per hour in each direction during the daytime from Monday to Saturday, with a train every 15 minutes. In late evenings and on Sundays, the service is reduced to two trains per hour in each direction. Services are operated by Class 777s.

Preceding station	National Rail	Following station
Headbolt Lane Terminus	Merseyrail Northern Line	Fazakerley towards Liverpool Central
	Former services	
Terminus	Northern Trains Kirkby Branch Line	Rainford
	Disused railways	
Terminus	Lancashire and Yorkshire Railway North Mersey Branch	Aintree Racecourse
Rainford towards Bury	Lancashire and Yorkshire Railway Liverpool and Bury Railway	Fazakerley towards Liverpool Exchange

== Gallery ==
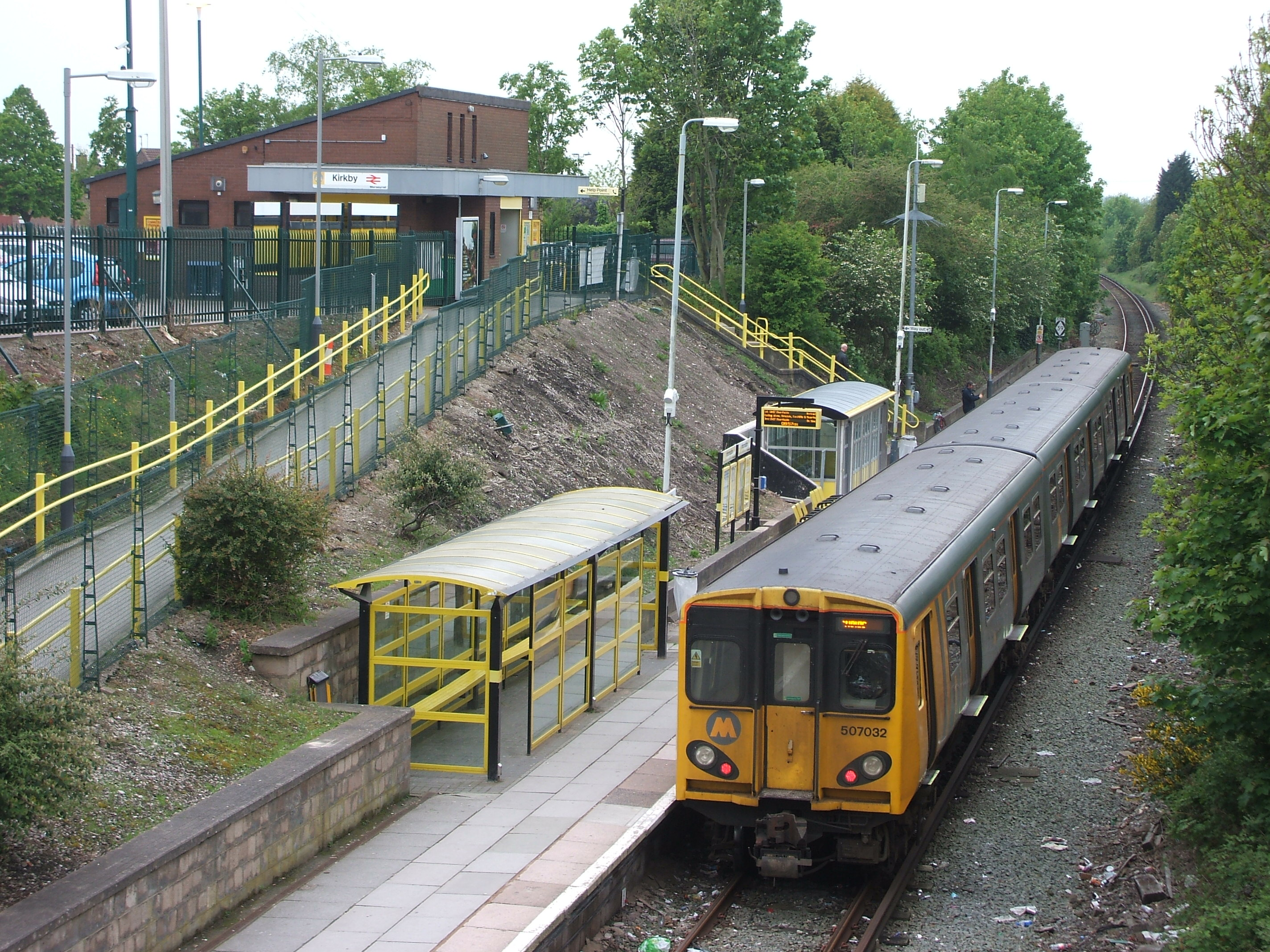
An overall view of the Merseyrail platform.

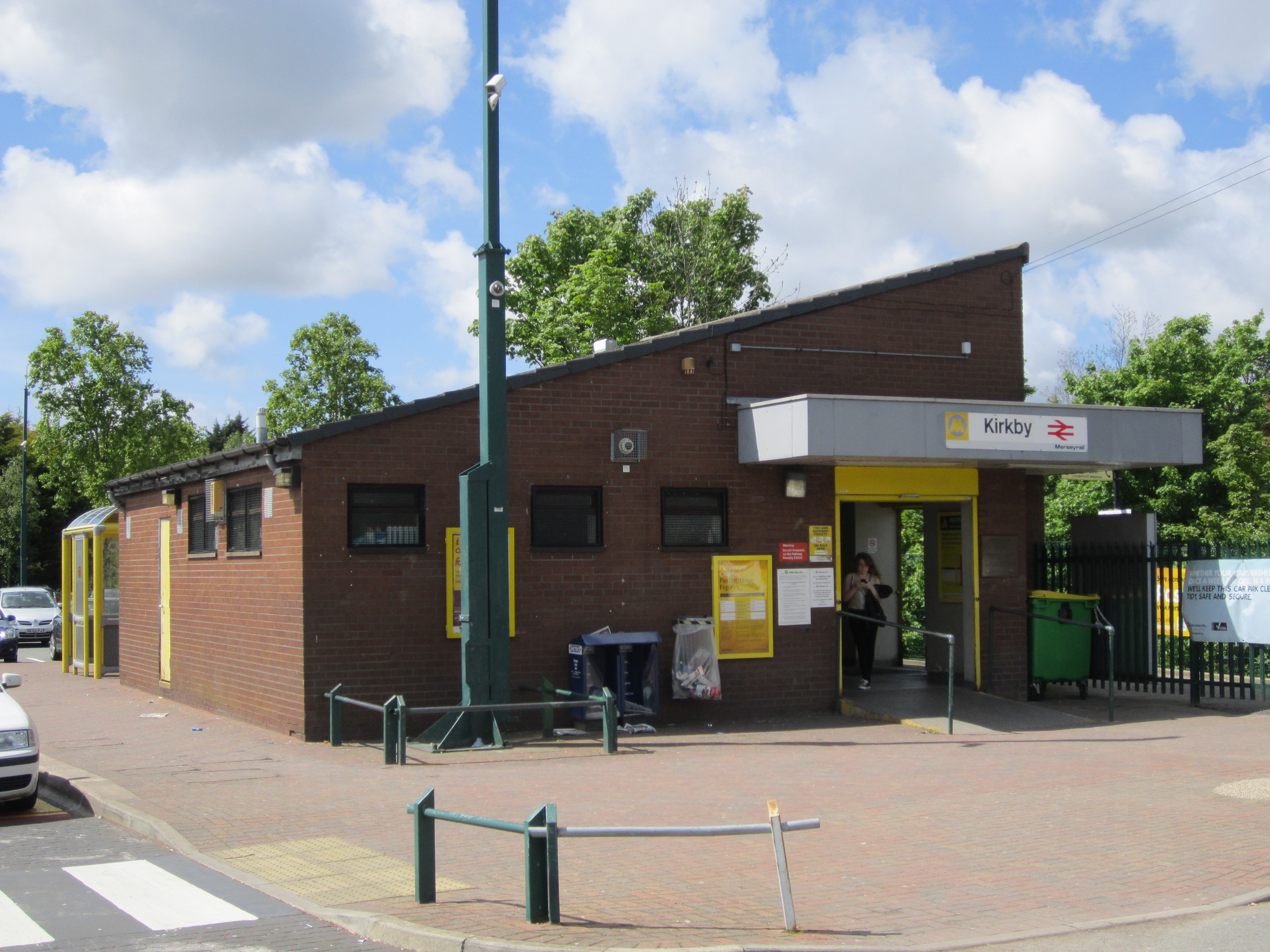
The ticket office.

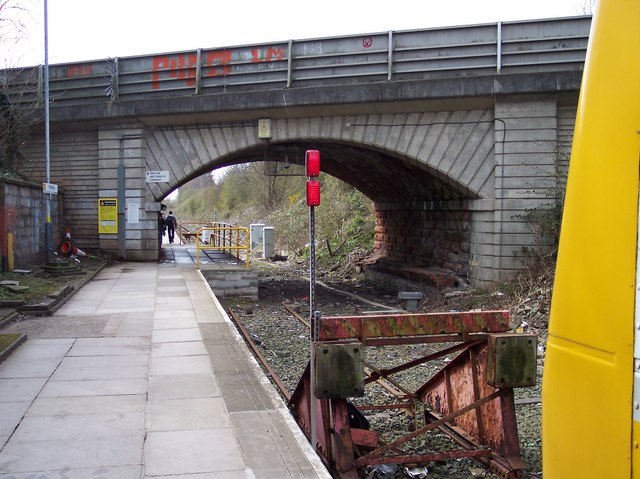
View of the former layout from the eastern side of the overbridge.
