= Wigan Wallgate railway station =

Railway station in Greater Manchester, England

Wigan Wallgate
- The station frontage in 2026

General information
- Location: Wigan, Metropolitan Borough of Wigan, England
- Coordinates: 53°32′42″N 2°38′02″W
- Grid reference: SD581055
- Manager: Northern Trains
- Transit authority: Transport for Greater Manchester
- Platforms: 3

Other information
- Station code: WGW
- Classification: DfT category D

History
- Original company: Lancashire & Yorkshire Railway
- Pre-grouping: Lancashire and Yorkshire Railway
- Post-grouping: London, Midland & Scottish Railway

Key dates
- 20 November 1848: First station opened
- 26 May 1860: Second station opened
- 2 February 1896: Final station opened as Wigan
- 2 June 1924: Renamed Wigan Wallgate

Passengers
- 2020/21: ▼0.356 million
- Interchange: ▼57,777
- 2021/22: ▲1.077 million
- Interchange: ▲0.152 million
- 2022/23: ▲1.090 million
- Interchange: ▲0.271 million
- 2023/24: ▲1.161 million
- Interchange: ▼0.267 million
- 2024/25: ▲1.253 million
- Interchange: ▲0.287 million
Location
Notes
- Passenger statistics from the Office of Rail and Road

Wigan Wallgate is one of two railway stations serving the town centre of Wigan, in Greater Manchester, England; the other is Wigan North Western, which is 100 metres (110 yd) away across the street named Wallgate. The station serves two routes: the Manchester-Southport Line and the Manchester-Kirkby Line. It is sited 16 miles (26 km) down the line from Manchester Victoria, via Atherton. The station is managed by Northern Trains, which also operates all trains serving it.

== History ==
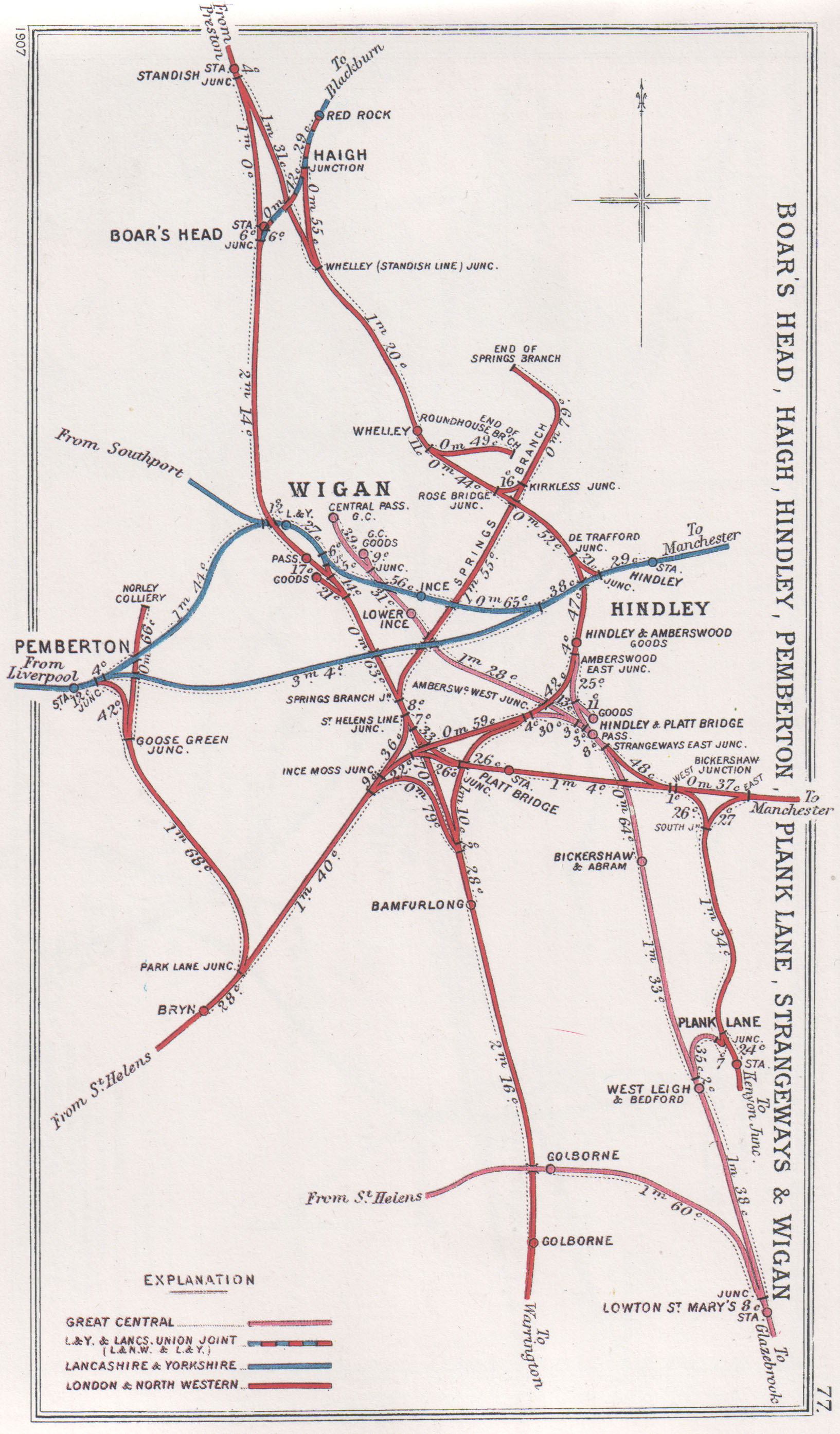
Lines around Wigan in 1907

There have been three Lancashire & Yorkshire Railway (L&YR) stations on their lines through Wigan over the years.

The original L&YR station at Wigan was opened on 20 November 1848, when the L&YR opened the line between Liverpool and Lostock Junction (to the west of Bolton on the Manchester to Preston Line). The station was located east of the current station, closer to the London & North Western Railway (LNWR) station. Its possible location can be seen, although unmarked, on the 1849 O.S. six-inch map immediately to the south-west of the line and east of Wallgate (the road). (Note: The site that will become the station in 1860 is marked as Engine Shed, this site is approximately ¼ mile west of the first station as reported by Quick(2023).) This station was described by the press at the time as a 'hovel'.

On 9 April 1855, the L&YR opened a line between Wigan and Southport. Following this on 26 May 1860 Wigan's L&YR station was relocated to a larger station positioned slightly west of where Wallgate station is today. The station main access was from Dorning Street to the north, with another access along a lane from Wallgate. The station consisted of two platforms joined by a wide curved passageway forming a bridge over the running lines.

The L&YR introduced a passenger service on 14 September 1868 between Wigan L&YR station and Chorley, utilising the route from Hindley to Blackrod which had opened for freight traffic on 15 July 1868. On 1 December 1869, the Chorley trains were extended to Blackburn. The London & North Western Railway (LNWR) ran a competing service from Wigan LNWR, via Boar's Head, which shared the same route from Adlington onwards to Blackburn.

On 1 October 1888, the L&YR line from Atherton to Hindley opened, this was the last section of a direct route between Wigan and Manchester Victoria that avoided the bottleneck of traffic around Bolton. The L&YR then introduced fast, regular trains between Manchester Victoria and Liverpool Exchange, in direct competition with the LNWR which used a more direct route between Manchester Exchange and Liverpool Lime Street.

Journey times between Manchester and Liverpool were further improved when a bypass line opened on 1 June 1889 between Hindley and Pemberton, passing to the south of Wigan. (Note: The by-pass line was sometimes known as the Pemberton loop line, the Wigan avoiding line and the Westwood Park line.) This allowed a faster journey for the L&YR's Manchester–Liverpool expresses by avoiding Wigan station. Express trains from Liverpool continued to serve Wigan L&YR on the route to Bolton Trinity Street, Rochdale and West Yorkshire.

From around 1890, the L&YR was criticised by Wigan Corporation regarding the standard of its station and poor facilities; this led to it being replaced by the current station, which opened on 2 February 1896. The new station partially overlapped its predecessor, but had new buildings facing directly onto Wallgate.

After the grouping of railways following World War I, both the L&YR and the LNWR came under the auspices of the London, Midland & Scottish Railway. This meant there were now two stations called Wigan, so they were both renamed on 2 June 1924: this station became Wigan Wallgate and the LNWR station Wigan North Western.

Passenger trains between Wigan Wallgate, Chorley and Blackburn, via Hindley, were withdrawn on 4 January 1960.

Following implementation of British Railways' 1955 Modernisation Plan, steam traction was being phased out; by 1968, most services through Wigan Wallgate had been converted to diesel multiple unit (DMU) operation. The steam locomotive depot, just west of Wallgate, had closed in April 1964 and the sidings converted for stabling of DMUs. The 1965 British Rail London Midland timetable still shows express trains (Liverpool Exchange to Yorkshire and beyond) using or bypassing Wigan Wallgate.

The direct line from Hindley to Pemberton was closed on 14 July 1969 and all Manchester to Liverpool Exchange trains were routed through Wallgate.

The line from Bolton to Rochdale, via Bury, was closed on 5 October 1970. Trains from Liverpool now generally terminated at Bolton. Southport trains provided the main service to and from Manchester Victoria.

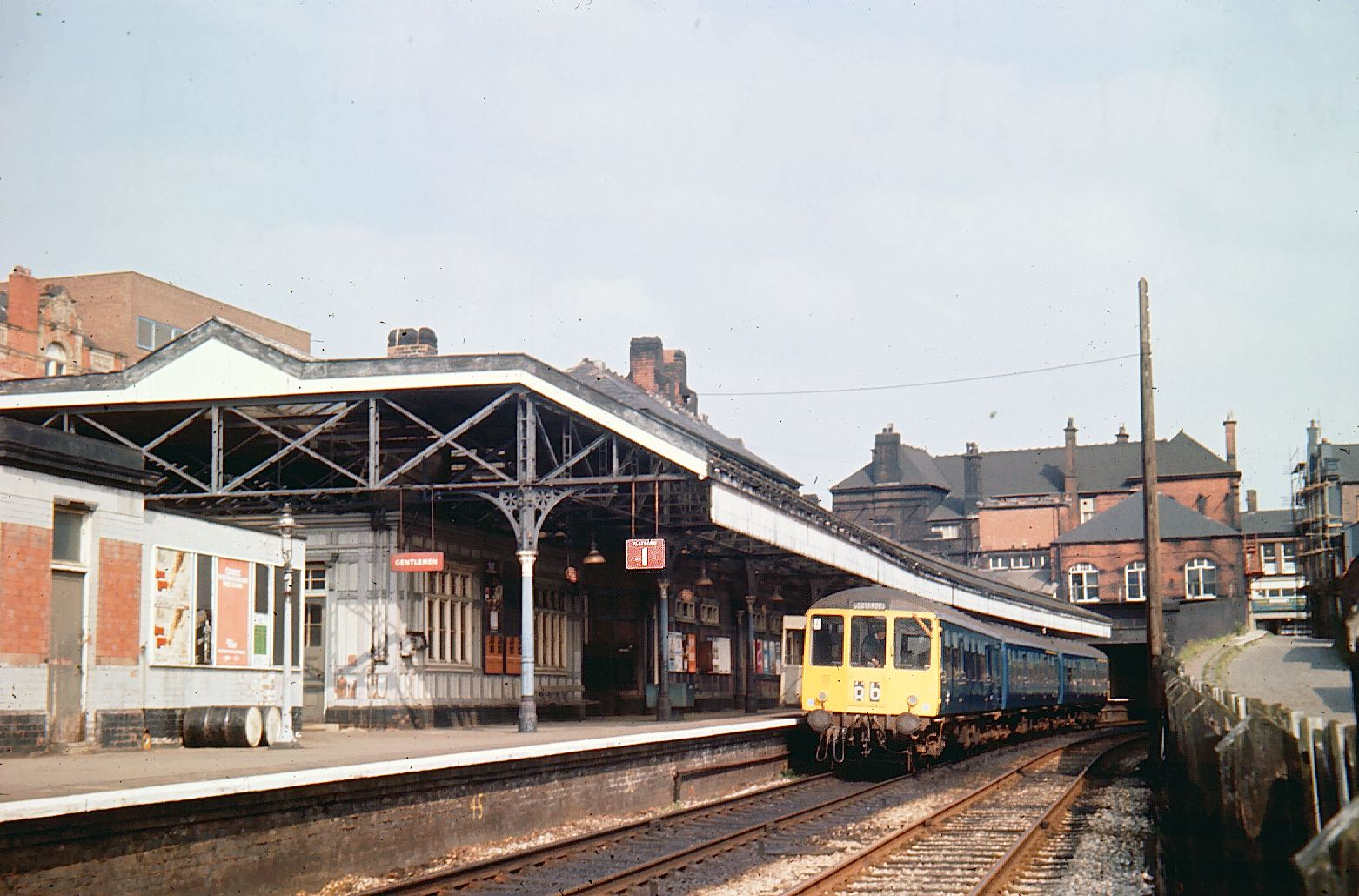
The Victorian platform buildings in 1976 before their demolition

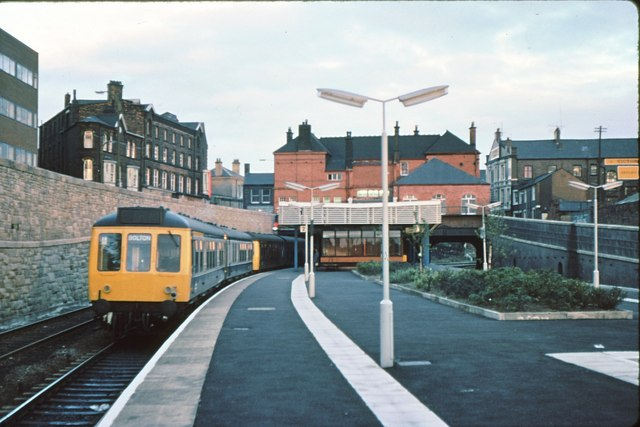
The newly constructed platform buildings in 1979

On 30 April 1977, the former L&YR terminus at Liverpool Exchange was closed. Trains were rerouted onto a new underground line beneath Liverpool city centre to Moorfields and Liverpool Central. Since DMUs could not operate in the tunnels, trains from the Wigan line initially terminated at Sandhills (the last surface station), with passengers transferring to or from electric trains on the Southport or Ormskirk lines for the short trip into Liverpool city centre.

During the early and mid-1970s, the frequency of British Rail's trains from Wigan Wallgate was reduced. Services operated at irregular intervals; those from the Liverpool line ran only as far as Wigan or Bolton and there were no off-peak trains on the Atherton line. In May 1977, the train service was significantly improved under the financial sponsorship of Greater Manchester PTE; it subsidised British Rail to operate a regular interval timetable throughout the day, including stopping trains via the Atherton line. The improved frequency resulted in an increase in off-peak passenger numbers.

The trains to Liverpool (which had terminated at Sandhills following the opening of the Merseyrail link to Liverpool Central) were cut back to Kirkby on 12 May 1977. This happened when Merseyrail completed electrification of the western section of line between Liverpool and Kirkby. The diesel trains from Wigan were scheduled to meet an electric train from Liverpool at Kirkby and passengers would transfer along the same platform to complete their journeys. This arrangement continued at Kirkby until October 2023, when the electrification scheme was extended to a new Headbolt Lane station where the arrangement was repeated.

The Victorian-era buildings on the station platform at Wallgate were demolished in 1978 and new structures erected. The street-level building remained largely unscathed.

In 1988, the availability of destinations from the station was improved by the opening of the Windsor Link Line in Salford; this enabled trains from Wigan to access Manchester Oxford Road and Manchester Piccadilly stations.

A major refurbishment of infrastructure was completed in 2003. The £12 million project improved signalling, (Note: The LMS-era colour light signalling was replaced with a modern electronic control system.) replaced tracks and provided a new ticket office.

== Facilities ==
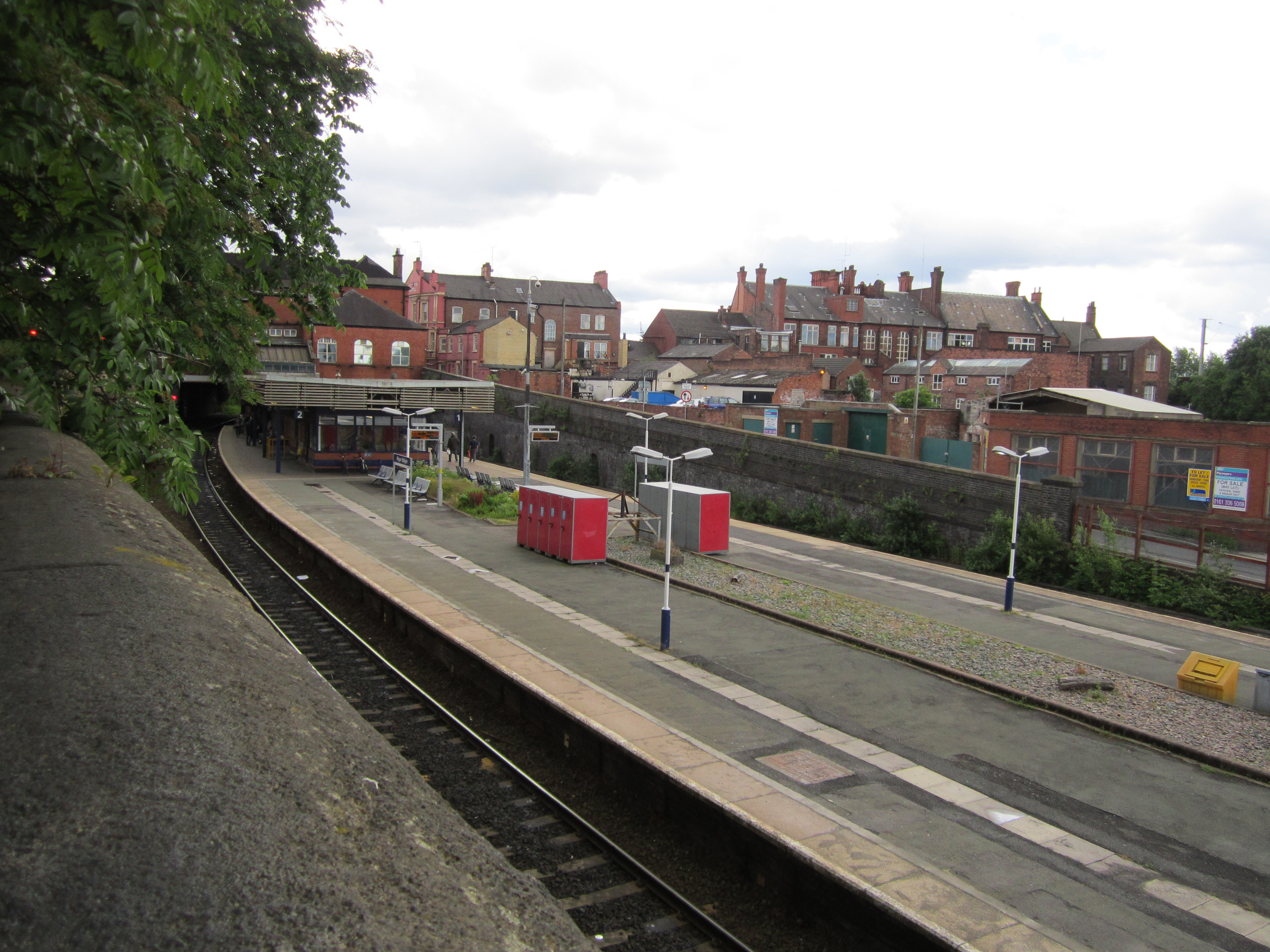
Platforms 1 and 2 in the Manchester direction

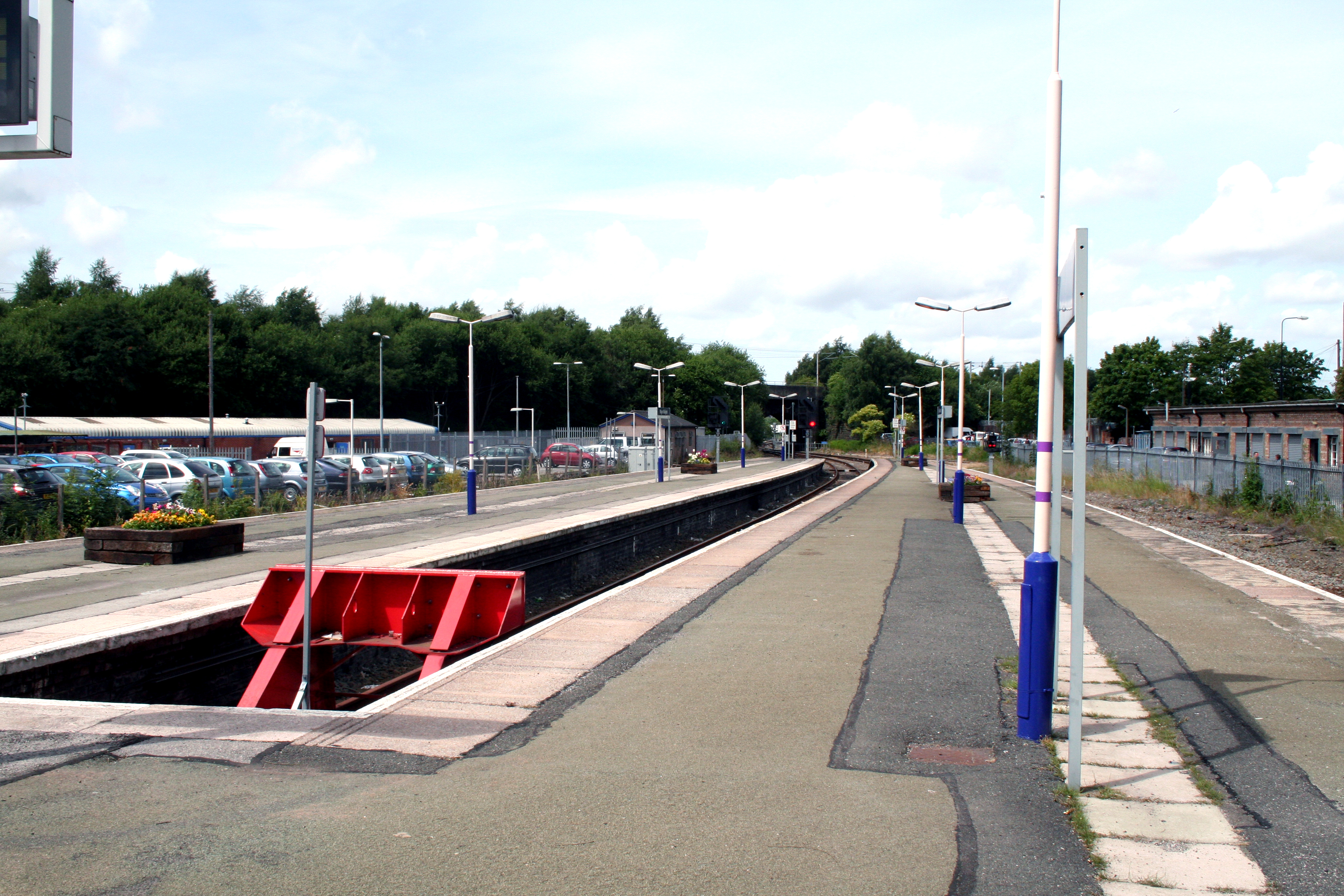
All three platforms in the Southport direction

There are three platforms: two through platforms and one bay platform for trains departing towards Southport or Kirkby. They are below street level and are reached by a flight of stairs from the concourse, which contains a ticket office and a newsagent. A goods lift has been modified for passenger use to ensure step-free access to the platform.

The ticket office is staffed from 06:00 to 21:00 from Monday to Saturday, and from 08:00 to 20:00 on Sunday. Automated ticket barriers are in operation. Train running information is provided via digital display screens, timetable posters and automated announcements. Toilets and a waiting room are available at platform level.

== Services ==
=== Passenger ===
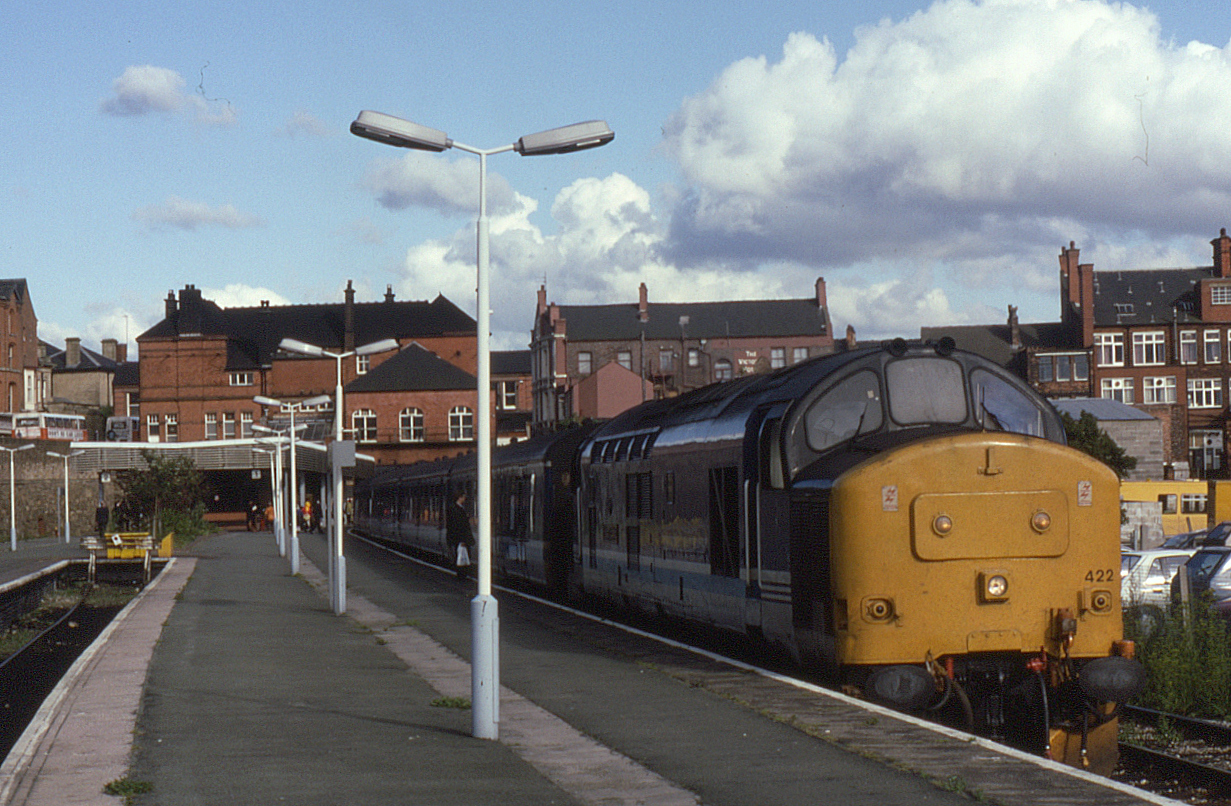
A Class 37 and coaches form a Regional Railways service in 1993

All passenger train services are provided by Northern Trains; the general off-peak service pattern in trains per hour is:

Monday to Saturday:

- 1 tph to Manchester Oxford Road, via Bolton
- 1 tph to Stalybridge, via Bolton and Manchester Victoria
- 1 tph to Blackburn via Atherton and Manchester Victoria
- 1 tph to Leeds, via Atherton, Manchester Victoria and Brighouse
- 2 tph to Southport
- 1 tph to Headbolt Lane.

Sunday:

- 1 tph to Blackburn, via Atherton and Manchester Victoria
- 1 tph to Southport.

Preceding station	National Rail	Following station
Gathurst	Northern Trains Southport - Manchester Oxford Road (Monday - Saturday)	Hindley
Gathurst	Northern Trains Southport - Manchester Oxford Road (Monday - Saturday)	Ince
Gathurst	Northern Trains Southport - Stalybridge (Monday - Saturday)	Hindley
Pemberton	Northern Trains Headbolt Lane - Blackburn (Monday - Saturday)	Ince
Gathurst	Northern Trains Southport - Blackburn (Sundays)	Ince

=== Freight ===
Most freight services run on the West Coast Main Line. There was a limited freight service through Wigan Wallgate during the early 2000s, operated by EWS running to Knowsley Freight Terminal on the Kirkby line; these were suspended in 2006. As of June 2016, the service was reinstated via Wallgate. The new service runs to/from Teesside six days per week.
