= Headbolt Lane railway station =

Railway station in Merseyside, England

Headbolt Lane

General information
- Location: Kirkby, Metropolitan Borough of Knowsley, England
- Coordinates: 53.4911°N 2.8856°W
- Grid reference: SJ417999
- Manager: Merseyrail
- Transit authority: Merseytravel
- Platforms: 3

Other information
- Station code: HBL

Key dates
- March 2022: Construction began
- 5 October 2023: Station opened

Passengers
- 2023/24: 0.411 million
- Interchange: 15,154
- 2024/25: ▲1.411 million
- Interchange: ▲17,871
Location

Headbolt Lane is a railway station in Kirkby, Merseyside, England, which opened on 5 October 2023. The station is the interchange between Merseyrail's Northern Line and the unelectrified Headbolt Lane branch line, operated by Northern Trains.

== History ==
The opening of a station in the area had been an objective since the Transport Plan for Merseyside, published by the Merseyside Passenger Transport Authority in March 1972, with detailed plans first developed in 2013.

The station was initially planned to act as a new Merseyrail terminus, but later proposals — made after the Electrification Task Force declared the Kirkby branch line to be a Tier 1 priority for electrification in 2015 — were devised by Merseytravel and Lancashire County Council to enable Merseyrail services to serve Skelmersdale.

In 2017, the two authorities commissioned an initial £5 million feasibility study into establishing the new rail link, including development of Headbolt Lane. It was initially estimated that it would cost around £300 million and would take up to a decade to deliver.

However, in July 2022, the Department for Transport rejected the Strategic Outline Business Case for the extension, suggesting that better bus links with the Kirkby–Wigan rail line would be a cheaper way of improving connectivity.

In August 2019, Liverpool City Region Combined Authority announced that part of an agreed £172m funding package for the region would be used to fund the construction of the new station. The Combined Authority approved that the first £3.3 million of funding for the project in July 2020, before signing off a further £66 million in March 2021.

The station was designed with three fully accessible platforms, to accommodate any future extension of Merseyrail services to Skelmersdale. A 270 space car park and a bus interchange were also part of the design.

The Liverpool City Region Combined Authority announced in July 2021 that, after a trial of a battery electric multiple unit (BEMU) version of the new Class 777, it would serve the new station on opening, eliminating the need for the line from Kirkby to be electrified.

Construction began on the station in March 2022. Services along the railway line from Wigan were cut back to Rainford from 7 April 2023, with bus replacement services provided between Rainford and Kirkby, to allow for the line to be double-tracked and a road bridge replaced.

Originally intended to open in summer 2023, delays caused by the contractor responsible for the construction of the station, the Buckingham group, going into administration meant that services did not commence until October.

== Facilities ==
Platforms 1 and 2 are for Merseyrail services, terminating platforms with buffer stops. Platform 3 lies beyond these for Northern Trains services.

There is a ticket office that is staffed from 15 minutes before the start of service until 15 minutes after the last train. The station also has a ticket-vending machine. There are multiple shelters on the platforms, along with digital displays and aural announcements on when the next service will be. The station is completely step-free and accessible for all customers. There is an 80-space secure bicycle storage area and a car park with 270 spaces.

== Services ==
The station is served by two train operating companies:

Merseyrail:

- 4 tph to Kirkby and Liverpool Central.

Northern Trains:

- 1 tph to Wigan Wallgate; of which:
  - Almost all services extend to Manchester Victoria and Blackburn, via Todmorden.

Preceding station	National Rail	Following station
Terminus	Merseyrail Northern Line	Kirkby towards Liverpool Central
Terminus	Northern Trains Kirkby Branch Line Monday-Saturday only	Rainford
