= Parbold railway station =

Railway station in Parbold, England

Coordinates: 53.591°N 2.771°W

Parbold
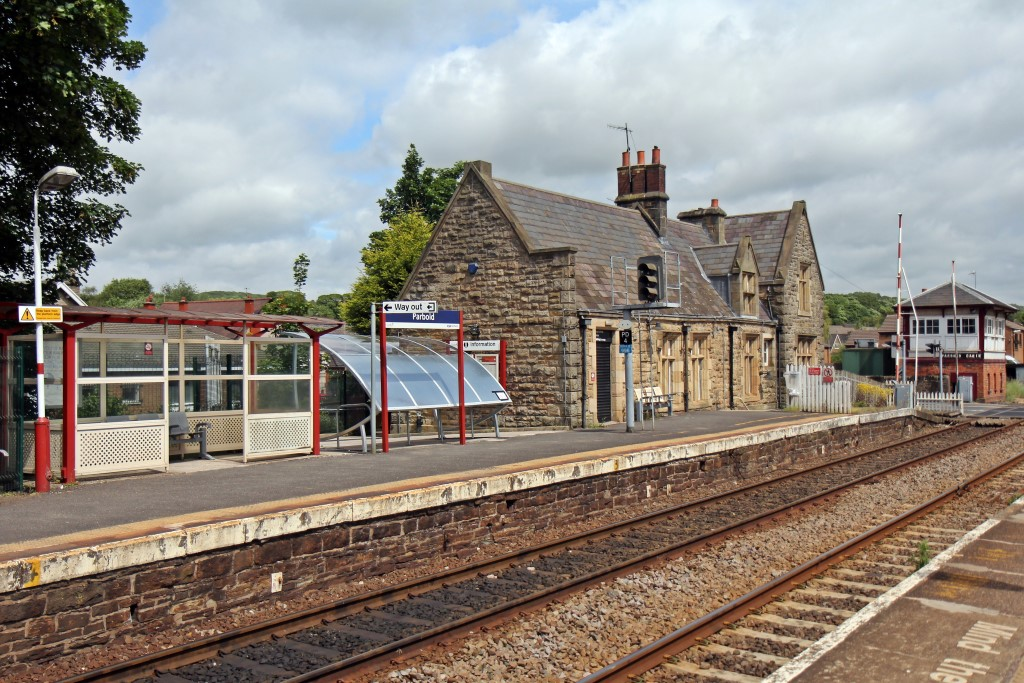
- Parbold railway station in 2015, the L&YR-era station building on the eastbound platform, with the level crossing and signal box, beyond

General information
- Location: Parbold, West Lancashire; England
- Grid reference: SD490107
- Manager: Northern Trains
- Platforms: 2

Other information
- Station code: PBL
- Classification: DfT category E

History
- Opened: 9 April 1855
- Original company: Lancashire and Yorkshire Railway
- Pre-grouping: Lancashire and Yorkshire Railway
- Post-grouping: London Midland and Scottish Railway

Passengers
- 2020/21: ▼30,478
- 2021/22: ▲83,010
- 2022/23: ▲98,350
- 2023/24: ▼94,348
- 2024/25: ▲98,762
Location
Notes
- Passenger statistics from the Office of Rail and Road

Parbold railway station, on the Manchester to Southport Line, serves the village of Parbold and the nearby village of Newburgh in West Lancashire, England. It is currently operated by Northern Trains.

== History ==
The station opened as Newburgh on 9 April 1855 when the Lancashire and Yorkshire Railway (L&YR) opened the line from Wigan Wallgate to Southport London Street, the line and station had been planned, authorised and construction started by the Manchester and Southport Railway before it was acquired by the L&YR on 3 July 1854. The main stone-built station building (still in use) was built during this time, in the standard L&YR style which had been described as "solid, substantial, well built of stone in the Elizabethan style, neat without undue ornament".

It radically altered the village, allowing workers to live in Parbold and commute to urban areas throughout the North West. The railway station also provided a natural centre for the village which it still is today.

Parbold railway station became part of the London, Midland and Scottish Railway during the Grouping of 1923. The station then passed to the London Midland Region of British Railways on nationalisation in 1948. When Sectorisation was introduced in the 1980s, the station was served by Regional Railways until the privatisation of British Rail. The station has retained its L&YR signal box, which operates the adjacent barrier level crossing.

In 2005 the railway station underwent a £250,000 restoration project which saw the ticket office restored to its former glory and new fences and CCTV installed.

== Facilities ==
The station is staffed on a part-time basis, with the ticket office open from 06:45 to 13:00 on weekdays only (closed Saturdays and Sundays). At other times, tickets must be purchased prior to travel or on the train. Train running information can be obtained from timetable posters and by phone. There are shelters on both platforms and step-free access is available to each one.

== Name ==
The station was originally named Newburgh after the nearest large village (Newburgh) but this became Newburgh for Parbold and then Parbold for Newburgh. At this point Dalton wanted to also to be mentioned in the official name so the railway company decided to just call the station Parbold (this happened before 1910 as the station was called Parbold in the Bradshaw of that date). At one point however the station was again renamed as Parbold for Newburgh (see 1960s and 1980s British Railway timetables.) Finally on 5 May 1975 the station became once again plain Parbold.

== Services ==
On Monday to Saturday, there are two trains an hour westbound to Southport and eastbound to Wigan. Beyond here, services run via Bolton to either Stalybridge via Manchester Victoria or Manchester Oxford Road (services beyond there towards Manchester Piccadilly and points south ended at the winter 2022 timetable change) Passengers for stations on the Atherton line now have to change at Wigan Wallgate on weekdays and Saturdays.

On Sundays there is an hourly service to Southport and Blackburn via Atherton and Manchester Victoria.

Preceding station	National Rail	Following station
Hoscar or Burscough Bridge	Northern Trains Manchester–Southport line	Appley Bridge

== Bibliography ==
- Grant, Donald J. (2017). Directory of the Railway Companies of Great Britain (1st ed.). Kibworth Beauchamp, Leicestershire: Troubador Publishing Ltd. ISBN 978-1-78803-768-6.
- Marshall, John (1969). The Lancashire & Yorkshire Railway. Vol. 1. Newton Abbot: David & Charles. ISBN 978-0-7153-4352-4.
- Quick, Michael (2023) [2001]. Railway passenger stations in Great Britain: a chronology (PDF). version 5.05. Railway & Canal Historical Society.
