= Burscough Bridge railway station =

Railway station in Burscough, Lancashire, England

Coordinates: 53.605°N 2.842°W

Burscough Bridge
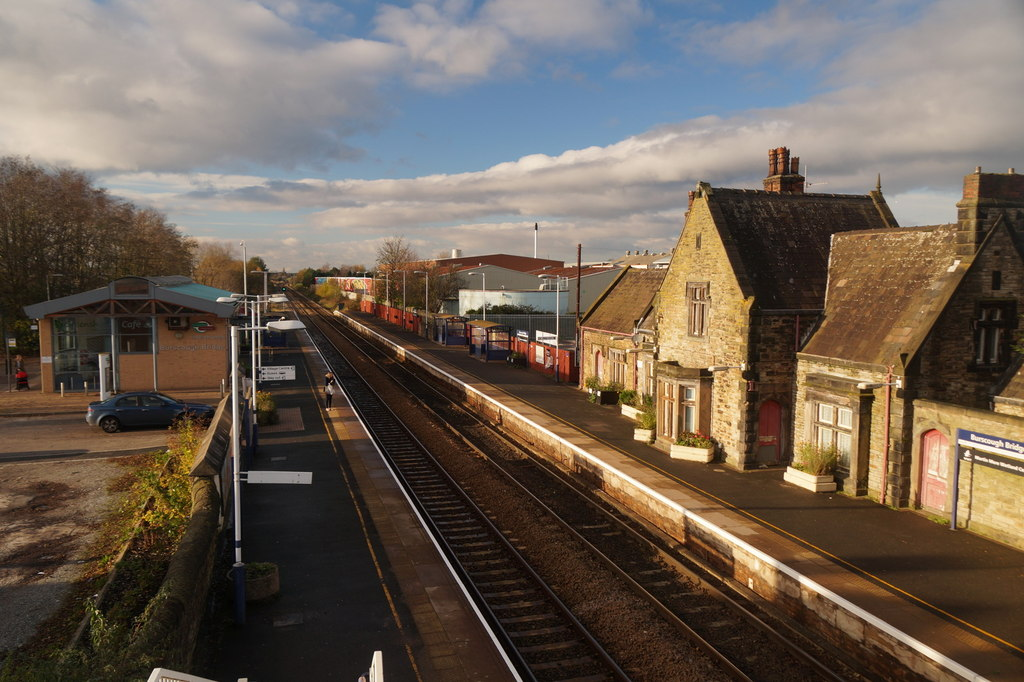
- The station seen in 2015

General information
- Location: Burscough, West Lancashire; England
- Grid reference: SD444124
- Manager: Northern Trains
- Platforms: 2

Other information
- Station code: BCB
- Classification: DfT category F1

History
- Opened: 9 April 1855
- Original company: Lancashire and Yorkshire Railway and East Lancashire Railway jointly
- Pre-grouping: Lancashire and Yorkshire Railway
- Post-grouping: London Midland and Scottish Railway

Passengers
- 2020/21: ▼51,210
- 2021/22: ▲0.141 million
- 2022/23: ▲0.165 million
- 2023/24: ▲0.167 million
- 2024/25: ▼0.166 million

Listed Building – Grade II
- Feature: Burscough Bridge Railway Station
- Designated: 1 March 1993
- Reference no.: 1196638
Location
Notes
- Passenger statistics from the Office of Rail and Road

Burscough Bridge railway station is one of two railway stations which serve the town of Burscough in Lancashire, England (the other being Burscough Junction). It lies on the Manchester-Southport Line, operated and managed by Northern Trains, and is between New Lane and Hoscar, 27 miles 58 chains (44.6 km) from Manchester Victoria (measured via Wigan Wallgate). There is a bus interchange next to the station. The station has been identified by Merseytravel as a potential interchange between the Liverpool to Ormskirk line and the Southport to Wigan line in its Liverpool City Region Long Term Rail Strategy.

Until 1962, when this passenger service was withdrawn, trains from Southport to Burscough Bridge could continue to Burscough Junction and onto Ormskirk by means of one of the two curves that linked Wigan to Southport route with the ex-East Lancashire Railway main line between Preston and Liverpool Exchange. Both connections have since been lifted, but the formations remain and there have been calls from various parties to reopen them to allow through running from Southport to both Ormskirk and Preston.

== History ==
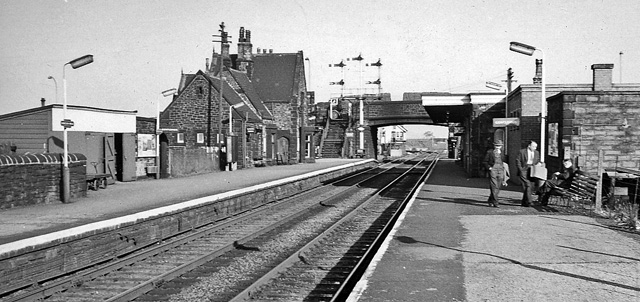
Looking towards Wigan in 1964

The station opened on 9 April 1855, when the Lancashire and Yorkshire Railway (L&YR) and the East Lancashire Railway (ELR) jointly opened the line from Wigan Wallgate to Southport London Street, the line and station had been planned, authorised and construction started by the Manchester and Southport Railway before it was acquired by the L&YR and ELR on 3 July 1854. The main stone-built station building (no longer in use) was built during this time, in the standard L&YR style which had been described as "solid, substantial, well built of stone in the Elizabethan style, neat without undue ornament".

There was a tragic incident at the station in September 1924 when a member of the public was hit while crossing the line by the staff crossing, rather than obeying the signs and using the road bridge. Alfred Rimmer, aged 55, of Burscough was caught by the first carriage of an express train, knocking him under the wheels. His body was "terribly mutilated".

The main buildings on the Wigan-bound platform still stand, but are now in private use.

== Facilities ==
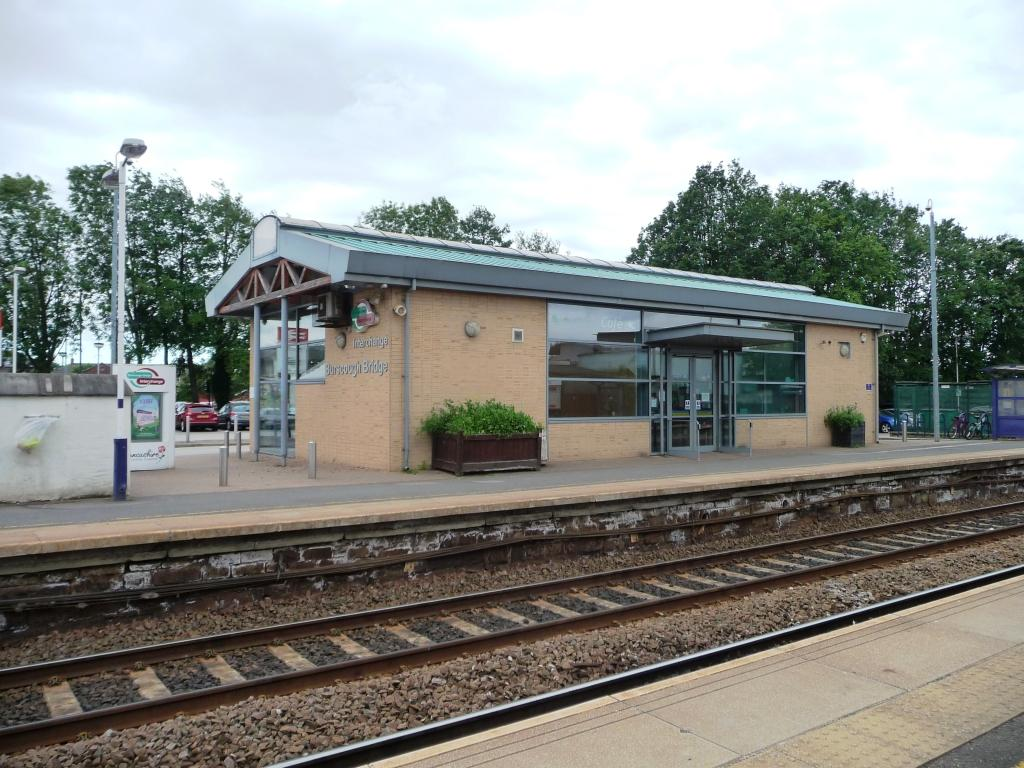
The bus interchange, including former ticket office and cafe, at Burscough Bridge

A ticket office was built within the complex; this opened in 2005, but was closed on 25 June 2016 due to council budget cuts (as it was not operated by Northern). A public notice from Lancashire County Council informs passengers that the nearest staffed station is either Ormskirk or Parbold. The ticket office was mistakenly reported as open in 2018.

There is step-free access to both platforms. There are also toilets, ticket machines, shelters, cycle storage and live departure screens.

== Passenger volume ==
Passenger volume at Burscough Bridge
	2004–05	2005–06	2006–07	2007–08	2008–09	2009–10	2010–11	2011–12	2012–13	2013–14	2014–15	2015–16	2016–17	2017–18	2018–19	2019–20	2020–21	2021–22	2022–23	2023–24	2024–25
Entries and exits	136,966	155,437	178,147	194,615	211,512	215,558	222,382	219,206	210,842	219,590	227,888	233,552	241,534	241,684	216,156	217,920	51,210	140,864	165,298	167,468	166,054

The statistics cover twelve month periods that start in April.

== Services ==
On Monday to Saturday, there are two trains an hour westbound to Southport and eastbound to Wigan. Eastbound trains now continue via Bolton to both Manchester stations. One runs to Manchester Victoria and Stalybridge and the other to Manchester Oxford Road. Passengers for Manchester Piccadilly, Stockport and points south need to change at Oxford Road. On Sundays, there is an hourly service to Southport and Blackburn via Manchester Victoria. These run via Atherton.

Preceding station	National Rail	Following station
New Lane or Meols Cop or Southport	Northern Trains; Manchester–Southport line	Hoscar or Parbold
	Disused railways	
Rufford	Lancashire and Yorkshire Railway; Burscough Curves North	Terminus
Terminus	Lancashire and Yorkshire Railway; Burscough Curves South	Burscough Junction

== Community rail ==
The station, along with all others on the line, is supported by Community Rail Lancashire, a Community Rail Partnership.

== Future proposals ==
During the rail restructuring of the 1960s and 1970s, the "Burscough Curves", which formed a link between the Ormskirk-Preston and Southport-Wigan lines were removed, although the formation survives. The North Curve was taken out of use and severed in July 1969, being lifted in 1973: it was last used for a Saturdays only empty train from Blackpool to Southport. The South Curve was singled in 1970, but remained in use to serve the extensive sidings at the MOD depot located just to the north of Burscough Junction station. It saw its last train in 1982.

The passenger service from Ormskirk to Burscough Junction and on to Southport, which used the southern curve, was withdrawn in 1962.

In June 2009, the Association of Train Operating Companies, in its Connecting Communities: Expanding Access to the Rail Network report, called for funding for the reopening of this line as part of a £500m scheme to open 33 stations on 14 lines closed in the Beeching Axe, including seven new parkway stations. The uses of the curves in a new service pattern has been identified by Network Rail, if electrified along with the through lines.

Additionally, Network Rail has identified electrification of Wigan to Southport, together with the Ormskirk to Preston Line and the Burscough Curves as a possible source of new services.

=== Battery trains as enabler to open the curves ===
The New Merseyrail Fleet A Platform For Future Innovations document, mentions regarding Ormskirk-Preston enhancements, that there is the potential to use battery powered Merseyrail units that may improve the business case for opening the curves. The document states there will be a review after the Merseyrail units have been tested for battery operation in 2020.

=== MP unification ===
In March 2020, the MPs for Southport, South Ribble, West Lancs and Preston (Damien Moore, Katherine Fletcher, Rosie Cooper and Sir Mark Hendrick) along with Lancashire County Council leader Geoff Driver united in a bid to pressure Network Rail and the Government to reinstate the curves. The bid that was put forward was seeking just £50,000 funding to look further into feasibility studies and start preparation for a formal business case. However, the Department for Transport made the decision to turn down the application.

== See also ==
- Listed buildings in Burscough

== Bibliography ==
- Grant, Donald J. (2017). Directory of the Railway Companies of Great Britain (1st ed.). Kibworth Beauchamp, Leicestershire: Troubador Publishing Ltd. ISBN 978-1-78803-768-6.
- Marshall, Geoff; Pipe, Vicki (2018). The Railway Adventures: Places, Trains, People and Stations. September Publishing. ISBN 978-1910463871.
- Marshall, John (1969). The Lancashire & Yorkshire Railway. Vol. 1. Newton Abbot: David & Charles. ISBN 978-0-7153-4352-4.
- Quick, Michael (2023) [2001]. Railway passenger stations in Great Britain: a chronology (PDF). version 5.05. Railway & Canal Historical Society.
