= Blowick =

Suburb of Southport, Merseyside, England

Coordinates: 53.63999°N 2.97307°W

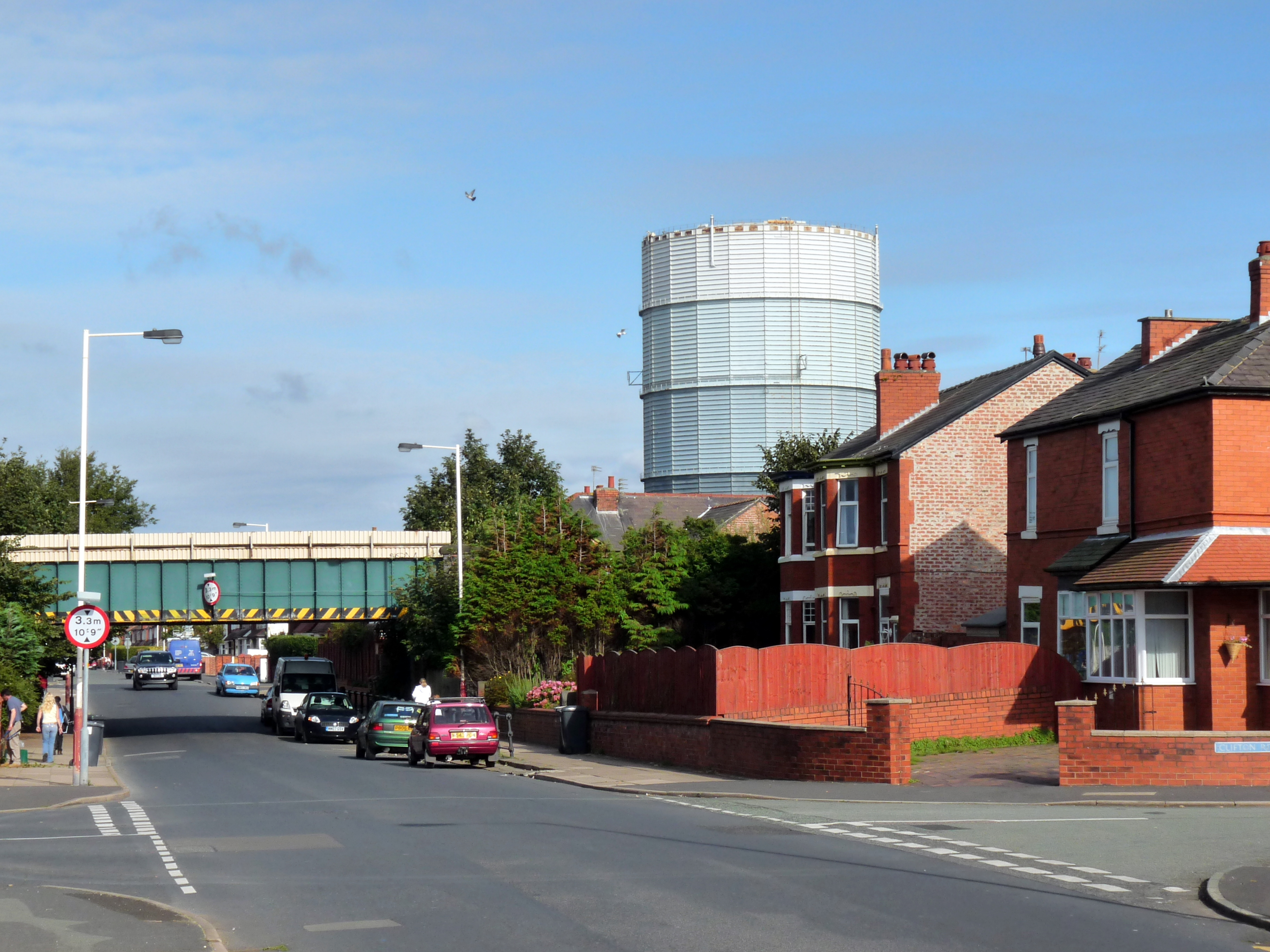
- The view down Peel Street, looking towards the gas holder on 19 September 2008

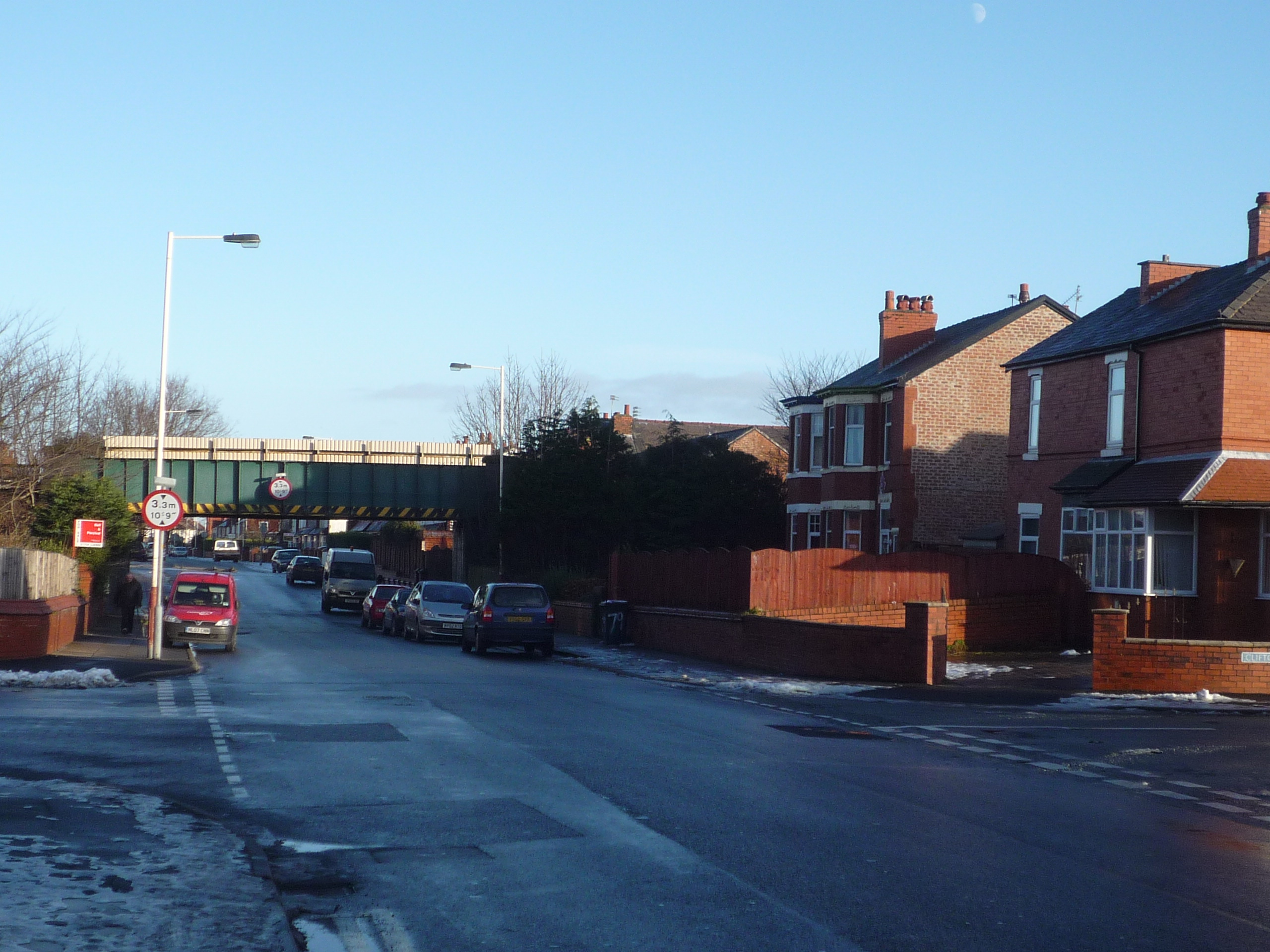
- The same view on 26 December 2009

- Location in Southport Location within Merseyside
- OS grid reference: SD357163
- Metropolitan borough: Sefton
- Metropolitan county: Merseyside
- Region: North West
- Country: England
- Sovereign state: United Kingdom
- Post town: SOUTHPORT
- Postcode district: PR8
- Dialling code: 01704
- Police: Merseyside
- Fire: Merseyside
- Ambulance: North West
- UK Parliament: Southport

Blowick is a suburb on the east side of the town of Southport, Merseyside, England.

== History and toponymy ==
Blowick is part of the ancient parish of North Meols and was formerly a detached settlement, on the northern fringe of what is now Southport.

The name derives from the Old Norse name Bla Vik meaning "dark bay" as it was located at the end of a large inlet on the ancient lake of Martin Mere called "The Wyke" which ended roughly at Crowland Street and drained into the Old Pool. There are historically two Blowicks: Higher Blowick, situated around what is now the junction of Everard Road and Southbank Road, and Lower Blowick (Butts Lane, Norwood Road, etc.), which is the area around what locals tend to refer to now as simply Blowick. The countryside on which the nearby Kew Housing Estate is built on what was known as Blowick Moss, and a local road on the estate is known as Blowick Moss Lane.

== Landmarks ==
The Southport gas holder on Crowland Street was the tallest building on the Southport skyline, visible from as far afield as Blackpool and Parbold. The largest tower was decommissioned in January 2008, due to an environmental risk posed by the storage of oil within it. In September 2008, National Grid announced that two of the three gas towers would be dismantled by August 2009, with the fate of the smallest tower remaining uncertain. The news has met with mixed reactions from local residents, though the gas holder was voted one of the North West's biggest eyesores in a competition run by the BBC.

The Thatch & Thistle is a modern thatched public house on Norwood Road built on the site of the original Blowick pub. Known for a time as The Thatch Inn, the pub closed on 21 August 2008 after Cains Brewery went into administration, but reopened the following day under new management.

Haig Avenue football stadium, the home of National League North team Southport F.C., is also located in Blowick.

The Southport Bus Depot is situated on Canning Road in Blowick and is a Victorian building with lavish architecture for a storage building and even has a clock built into the wall.

== Education ==
The area has a secondary school Meols Cop High School and a sixth form college King George V College. The former was previously a secondary modern school and the latter a grammar school.

== Transport ==
Blowick is served by Meols Cop railway station on Northern's Manchester to Southport Line. The station opened in 1887, originally as part of the Liverpool, Southport and Preston Junction Railway. In years gone by, Blowick had a further two railway stations: Butts Lane Halt (closed 1938), also on the Liverpool, Southport and Preston Junction Railway, and Blowick railway station (closed 1939) on the Manchester and Southport Railway.
