= Hoscar railway station =

Railway station in Lancashire, England

Hoscar
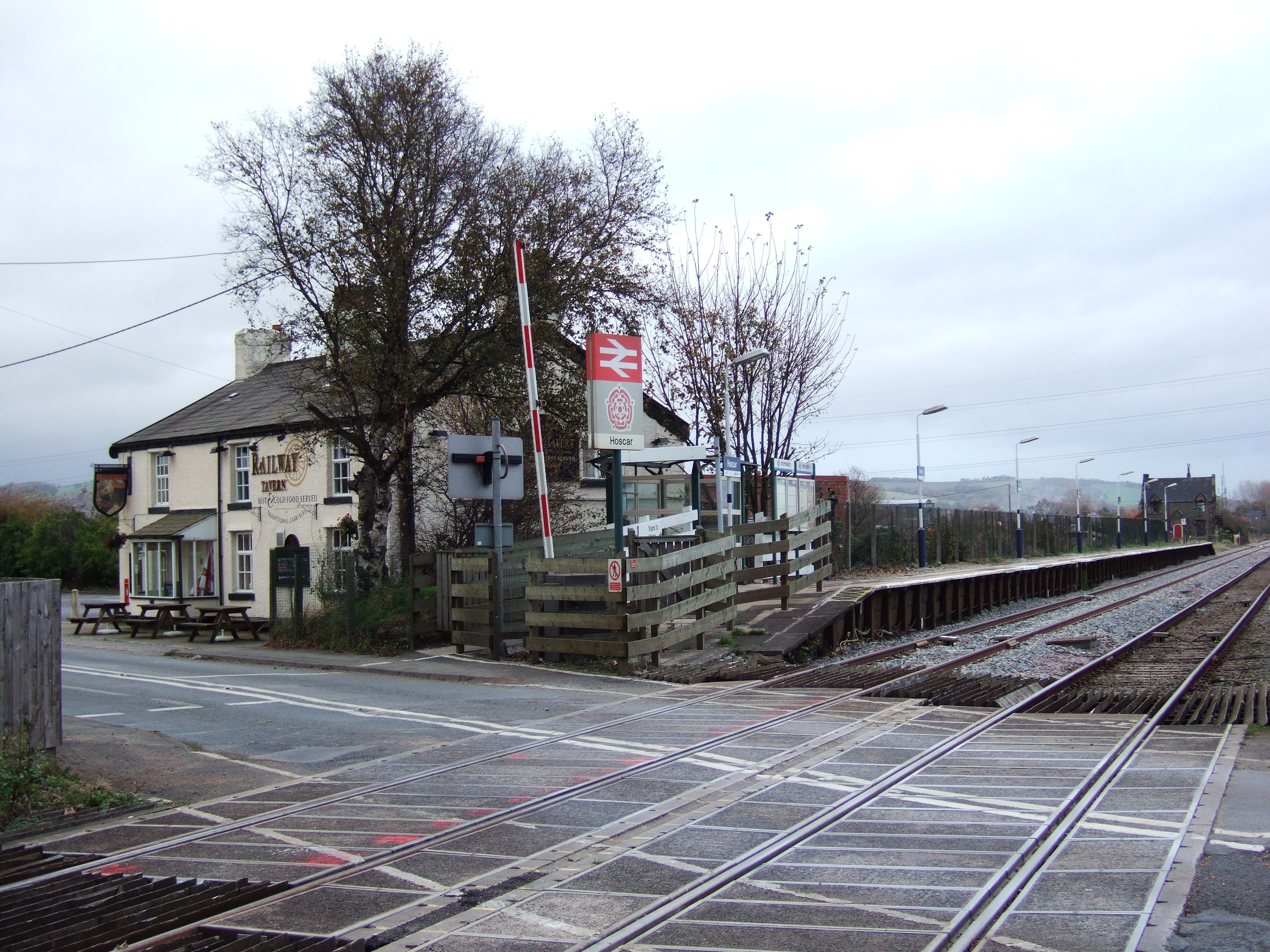

General information
- Location: Hoscar, West Lancashire; England
- Coordinates: 53.597°N 2.804°W
- Grid reference: SD469115
- Manager: Northern Trains
- Platforms: 2

Other information
- Station code: HSC
- Classification: DfT category F2

History
- Original company: Manchester and Southport Railway
- Pre-grouping: Lancashire and Yorkshire Railway
- Post-grouping: London Midland and Scottish Railway

Key dates
- 1 November 1870: Opened as Hoscar Moss
- 1 January 1900: Renamed Hoscar

Passengers
- 2021/22: ▲1,024
- 2022/23: ▼914
- 2023/24: ▼800
- 2024/25: ▲802
- 2025/26: ▲1,096
Location
Notes
- Passenger statistics from the Office of Rail and Road

Hoscar railway station serves the rural village of Hoscar in the civil parish of Lathom, near the town of Burscough, Lancashire, England. The station stands split across Hoscar Moss Road. Only 1,060 passenger journeys started or ended at Hoscar in 2014/15. Eight trains a day call on weekdays in each direction, all provided by Northern Trains, who also manage the station.

== History ==
The station was built by the Lancashire and Yorkshire Railway (L&YR) and opened on 1 November 1870, the line through the station site had been open since 1855. The L&YR amalgamated with the London and North Western Railway on 1 January 1922 and, in turn, was grouped into the London, Midland and Scottish Railway (LMS) in 1923. Nationalisation followed in 1948. When Sectorisation was introduced in the 1980s, the station was served by Regional Railways until the privatisation of British Rail.

The station once boasted a goods yard which was used by local farmers to get their crops to the markets of Wigan, Manchester and Southport quickly. The former railway tavern is now a house.

In May 2019, Network Rail installed red light safety enforcement (RLSE) cameras at the station's level crossing to catch motorists flouting the crossing when the lights are on. The cameras were installed as the level crossing is an automatic half barrier (AHB) type. This is part of an effort by Network Rail to improve the safety of such crossings across the UK.

== Facilities ==
Hoscar has similar amenities to neighbouring New Lane and Bescar Lane, with no permanent buildings other than simple shelters (the old station house is still extant but in private ownership) and staggered platforms either side of an automatic level crossing. It is unstaffed and has no ticket machine, so all tickets must be purchased on the train or before travel. Step-free access is available to both platforms, and train running information can be obtained by telephone and from timetable information posters.

== Services ==
Trains west-bound run to Southport, and trains east-bound run to Wigan Wallgate, Manchester Victoria, Stalybridge and Manchester Oxford Road (peak hours only for the latter).

The basic frequency of trains calling at Hoscar is every two hours. The day's first train is to Southport at 06:29, and the final train is to Wigan Wallgate at 22:38.

Due to these infrequent services, it has been recognized as the least used station in Lancashire, only receiving 956 entries/exits in the 2019/20 period (March 2019-April 2020).

Preceding station	National Rail	Following station
Burscough Bridge	Northern Trains Manchester–Southport line (Monday-Saturday only)	Parbold

== Popular culture ==
The station was featured in an episode of Geoff Marshall's series least used stations in 2019 as the entry for Lancashire, as at the time of recording, it was the least used station in the region by passengers numbers, as recorded by ORR statistics.
