= Listed buildings in Burscough =

Burscough is a civil parish in the West Lancashire district of Lancashire, England. It contains 38 buildings that are recorded in the National Heritage List for England as designated listed buildings. Of these, two are at Grade II*, the middle grade, and the others are at Grade II, the lowest grade. The parish contains the large village of Burscough, the rural hamlet of Tarlscough, and the surrounding countryside. Passing through the parish is the Leeds and Liverpool Canal, and the junction between the canal and its Rufford Branch is in the parish. Also passing through the parish are the railways of the Ormskirk - Preston and the Manchester-Southport Lines, which cross in the parish. The oldest listed buildings are farmhouses and farm buildings, and houses and cottages. Associated with the canal are the structures at the junction, bridges and a lock. Associated with the railways are station buildings and a bridge. The other listed buildings include churches, a war memorial, and a former mill and its offices.

== Key ==
Grade	Criteria
II*	Particularly important buildings of more than special interest
II	Buildings of national importance and special interest

== Buildings ==
Name and location	Photograph	Date	Notes	Grade
Barn, Martin Hall Farm; 53.60375°N 2.86936°W	—	Late 16th century (probable)	The barn is timber-framed, partly replaced and partly encased in sandstone, a later bay to the north is in brick, and there is an asbestos sheet roof. The original part has three bays, and there is an outshut to the east. The barn has a wagon entrance with a porch, ventilation slits, and a four-light mullioned window. Inside, part of the timber-framing contains unusual horizontal plank panelling coated in daub.	II*
Burscough Hall Farmhouse; 53.59012°N 2.84298°W	—	Early 17th century	A brick house, partly pebbledashed, with a stone=slate roof. It has an irregular plan consisting of a main range with four gabled wings to the north and a large gabled barn to the south. The doorway is approached up two steps and has a semicircular canopy. There are two low storeys, and the windows are of various types.	II
Lathom's Farmhouse; 53.61157°N 2.83046°W	—	17th century	The farmhouse is in rendered roughcast, probably on brick, with a stone-slate roof. There are two low storeys, and originally three bays, with one bay added to the right. At the rear are two later extensions. The windows are casements, and on the front is a single-storey gabled porch.	II
Barton's Farmhouse; 53.60683°N 2.83864°W	—	1665	The former farmhouse is in rendered brick on a plinth with a slate roof. It has two storeys and two bays, with a later wing added to the right. There is a single-storey gabled porch, and the windows are casements. Inside the house is an inglenook and a bressumer.	II
Crabtree Farmhouse; 53.60330°N 2.86240°W	—	Late 17th century (probable)	The farmhouse is in pebbledashed brick on a rendered plinth, and has a composition tile roof. There are two low storeys and two bays, with a kitchen wing at the rear. There is a small two-storey gabled porch with a segmental-headed doorway. The windows are casements.	II
Thatch Cottage; 53.61838°N 2.82322°W		Late 17th century (probable)	Originally a farmhouse with an attached shippon, later converted into a house. It is cruck framed, encased in brick, and rendered. The house has one storey and an attic, and four bays, the left bay originally the shippon. The roof is thatched and contains two dormers. The windows are modern, and there is a 20th-century two-storey wing at the rear. Inside there are the remains of three cruck trusses.	II
Merscar House; 53.60727°N 2.89143°W	—	Late 17th or early 18th century	A pebbledashed brick house with sandstone dressings and a composition tile roof. It has two storeys with an attic, and a symmetrical three-bay front. There is a two-storey gabled porch that has a doorway with a wedge lintel. The windows have altered glazing and rectangular lintels. Inside there is a large inglenook and a bressumer.	II
Hurst Cottage; 53.62048°N 2.82128°W	—	c. 1700	Originally a farmhouse with an attached shippon, it has been converted into a house. The building is in brick with a slate roof and has two storeys. The former farmhouse has a plinth and two Bays, with the former shippon to the left. The windows are casements with segmental heads, and on the front is a gabled porch with a round-headed doorway.	II
Barn and stable, Wood House Farm; 53.60629°N 2.86239°W	—	1701	The lower parts of the building are in sandstone, the upper parts are in brick, and there is a stone-slate roof. It has five bays, the stables having the two bays at the north end. In the barn are a wagon entrance, a doorway, a loading door, and ventilation holes. The stable has a doorway with a fanlight, windows, and a datestone. On the roof of the stable is a ventilator, and there are steps leading up to a first-floor doorway.	II
Hatherleigh; 53.59402°N 2.83610°W	—	Early to mid 18th century	A brick house on a sandstone plinth with a roof of stone-slate at the front and slate at the rear, in two storeys with an attic. The main part has two bays, and to the left is a lower one-bay extension. The main part has a doorway with a fanlight and a 20th-century canopy. To the right of the doorway is a canted bay window, the other windows on the front of the house being sashes. In the right gable wall are two sash windows, two casements, and a two-light attic window.	II
Mill Dam Lane End Farmhouse; 53.59022°N 2.85640°W	—	Early to mid 18th century	A farmhouse, later divided into two dwellings, in brick with a slate roof. It has a T-shaped plan, with a main bay block and a rear wing. There are two storeys and an attic. On the front is a doorway with a 20th-century gabled porch and casement windows. In the right gable wall are altered windows and a small attic window.	II
Wood House Farmhouse; 53.60650°N 2.86209°W	—	Mid 18th century (probable)	The farmhouse is in pebbledashed brick with a stone-slate roof. It has two storeys and attics, and a symmetrical three-bay front. In the centre is a two-storey porch that has hipped roof, and a round-headed doorway with an architrave, an open pediment, and a fanlight. There is also a small gabled porch in the left gable end. Apart from two small attic windows, the windows are casements.	II
Forshaw's Farmhouse; 53.62159°N 2.82046°W	—	Late 18th century (probable)	The farmhouse is in stuccoed brick on a rendered plinth with a stone-slate roof. It has two low storeys and a symmetrical two-bay front. In the centre of the front is a gabled porch with a square-headed doorway. The windows are sliding sashes. At the rear is a small extension with a lean-to porch in the angle.	II
Mill Heights; 53.63377°N 2.86986°W		Late 18th century (probable)	Originally a tower windmill, it was later converted into a house. It is in brick with an almost circular plan, and has six stages. There is a 20th-century porch and two doorways in the bottom stage, and segmental-headed windows in a vertical arrangement on three sides of the building. At the top is a wooden cap in the shape of a boat, with fantail supports.	II
Baldwin's Lock and Bridge; 53.61419°N 2.82011°W	—	c. 1781	The lock and accommodation bridge are on the Rufford Branch of the Leeds and Liverpool Canal and are in sandstone. The lock has wooden gates at the north end and iron gates at the south. There are cast iron bollards on both sides, and an overflow channel on the west side. The bridge has a single arch and flat wooden deck.	II
German's Lock and Bridge; 53.61163°N 2.82316°W		c. 1781	The lock and accommodation bridge are on the Rufford branch of the Leeds and Liverpool Canal. The lock is in sandstone with wooden gates, it has cast iron bollards on each side, and an overflow channel on the west side. The bridge has a single basket arch with rusticated voussoirs, a parapet with rounded coping, and terminal piers.	II
Junction Bridge, canal basin and dry dock 53.59703°N 2.83085°W		c. 1781	These are situated at the junction of the Leeds and Liverpool Canal with its Rufford Branch. The structures are in sandstone, with the basin at the entrance to the branch. The dry dock is at right-angles to it, and has an entrance of wooden beams, two flights of steps, and on the floor is a set of wooden trestles.	II
Prescott Bridge; 53.61756°N 2.81693°W		c. 1781	The bridge carries Meadow Lane over the Rufford Branch of the Leeds and Liverpool Canal. It is in sandstone, partly replaced in concrete, and consists of a single semi-elliptical arch with a humped cobbled deck. The bridge has voussoirs and terminal piers.	II
Runnel Brow Bridge; 53.59986°N 2.82809°W		c. 1781	The bridge carries School Lane over the Rufford branch of the Leeds and Liverpool Canal. It is in sandstone and has a parapet of rendered brick. It consists of a single semi-elliptical arch, with plain voussoirs, a plain band, and has plain pilasters at the ends.	II
Canal lock 53.60036°N 2.82759°W		c. 1781	The lock is to the north of Runnel Brow Bridge on the Rufford branch of the Leeds and Liverpool Canal. It is in sandstone and has wooden gates. There is a wooden footbridge over the lower entrance, and an overflow channel on the west side that is culverted at the north end.	II
Top locks; lower lock 53.59819°N 2.82983°W		1781	The lock is on the Rufford branch of the Leeds and Liverpool Canal, it is in sandstone and has wooden gates. There is a wooden footbridge over the lower entrance, and an overflow channel on the west side.	II
Top locks; upper lock 53.59736°N 2.83050°W		1781	The lock is on the Rufford branch of the Leeds and Liverpool Canal, it is in sandstone and has wooden gates. There are steps at the north end of west side, and a wooden footbridge over the lower entrance.	II
172 and 172A Liverpool Road South; 53.59203°N 2.84907°W	—	Late 18th or early 19th century (probable)	A brick house with a slate roof, in two storeys with an attic, and with a symmetrical three-bay front. There is a central doorway, and top-hung casement windows with wedge lintels imitating 12-pane sash windows. In the gable end walls are attic windows.	II
Martin Lane Bridge; 53.60446°N 2.88631°W		Late 18th or early 19th century (probable)	The bridge carries Martin Lane over the Leeds and Liverpool Canal. It is in sandstone, and consists of a single semi-elliptical arch with plain voussoirs, pilaster terminals, and parapets with flat coping.	II
Square House; 53.59357°N 2.83905°W	—	c. 1800	The house was extended in about 1830–40, and there was a later addition to the rear. It is in Georgian style, in two storeys and with five bays. The left three bays are in brick with a stone-slate roof, and the right two bays are in sandstone with a slate roof. Above the doorway is a flat canopy, and the windows are sashes.	II
Yew Tree House; 53.59235°N 2.84940°W	—	c. 1800	The house was extended and altered in about 1900. It is in brick with sandstone dressings and a slate roof. There are two storeys with an attic, and the front facing the road has two bays. The windows are 20th-century top-hung casements with wedge lintels. In the right gable wall is a round-headed doorway that has a fanlight and a wooden architrave with fluted pilasters, a dentilled cornice, and an open pediment.	II
Roman Catholic Church of St John with presbytery 53.59020°N 2.84242°W	—	1815–18	A small tower was added to the church in 1915. The church and presbytery form an L-shaped plan. They are in brick on a sandstone plinth, the south wall of both being stuccoed to make the church resemble the presbytery. The presbytery has two storeys with an attic, a round-headed doorway, and sash windows. The windows on this face of the church are blind. In the east wall of the church are three large round-headed windows. Inside the church is a gallery and a reredos with four large Corinthian half-columns.	II
Junction Bridge; 53.59694°N 2.83096°W		1816	The bridge carries the towpath of the Leeds and Liverpool Canal over its junction with the Rufford Branch. It is in sandstone, and consists of a high semi-elliptical arch with rusticated voussoirs and a keystone flanked by panels containing the date. The bridge has a parapet with rounded coping, rusticated pilasters, and oval number plates.	II
2 and 4 Merscar Lane; 53.60736°N 2.88836°W	—	1819	A pair of brick cottages with a slate roof in two storeys. No. 2 has one bay and No. 4 has two bays. Both cottages have a doorway with a wedge lintel and a gabled wooden porch. The windows are casements with wedge lintels, and above the doorway of No. 4 is a datestone.	II
Barn, Hurst Cottage; 53.62061°N 2.82115°W	—	Early 19th century	A brick barn with a slate roof. It has an L-shaped plan with a two-bay main range and a one-bay wing. The barn contains a segmental-headed wagon entrance with a keystone, a three-light window, ventilation holes is a diamond pattern, a loading doorway with a segmental head, and three other doorways. (Note: Street View in March 2009 shows that the barn has been converted for domestic use.)	II
St John's Church; 53.60455°N 2.84038°W		1829–32	A Commissioners' church, it was designed by David Stewart, the chancel was added in 1887–89 by William Waddington and Sons, and this was followed by a vestry in about 1932. The church is in sandstone and has a slate roof. The west face is gabled and has three bays and four polygonal buttresses that rise to embattled turrets. On the apex of the gable is a bellcote that has an ogival top with a crocketed pinnacle. In the centre is an arched doorway; above it and in the outer bays are blind arched windows. Along the sides of the nave are two-light windows. The chancel has corner turrets, and windows containing Perpendicular tracery. Inside the church are galleries on three sides.	II*
Barn, Forshaw's Farm; 53.62146°N 2.82056°W	—	Early to mid 19th century (probable)	A brick barn with a slate roof, in two storeys and three bays. There are opposing wagon entrances with segmental heads. At the rear there is also a leading door, and in the right gable end are two doorways and two windows. (Note: Street View in March 2009 shows that the barn has been converted for domestic use.)	II
Railway bridge 53.60059°N 2.83713°W		1848	The bridge over the Leeds and Liverpool Canal was built by the East Lancashire Railway, and altered for the Lancashire and Yorkshire Railway in the early 20th century. The abutments are in limestone. The rest of the bridge was originally all in cast iron, but the girders carrying the trains were later replaced in steel. The cast iron side girders have four inscribed panels, above which are decorative railings.	II
Cottage, Anchor Farm; 53.61749°N 2.82815°W	—	Mid 19th century (probable)	A small cottage, in the corner of a field, in rendered brick with a slate roof. It has a single storey with a linear plan, and consists of two rooms. There is a very small lean-to at the rear.	II
Ainscough's Mill; 53.60059°N 2.83757°W		c. 1855	Originally a steam-powered corn mill, it was extended in 1885 and 1894, and again in the 20th century. The mill is in brick with sandstone dressings and slate roofs, it has an irregular L-shaped plan, and is in three parts. The northeast range has three gables facing the Leeds and Liverpool Canal, it is in six storeys and has six bays, with a five-bay wing to the rear. Along the canal face is a continuous canopy. The power unit to the northwest is also L-shaped. and comprises a boiler house, a two-storey engine house, and a tall chimney. The southeast range faces the Liverpool to Preston railway line, and has a nine-storey tower and a six-storey range. The mill has been converted into apartments.	II
Burscough Bridge railway station 53.60539°N 2.84106°W		c. 1855–60	The station was built for the Manchester and Southport Railway Company and is in Elizabethan style, and is in sandstone with slate roofs. The station building has a cruciform plan; there is a two-storey range at right angles to the track and one-storey wings. At the centre is a five-sided bay window with mullioned and transomed windows, and a cross window above. On the sides are Tudor arched doorways. The wings have rectangular bay windows. On each side is a lower extension containing a Tudor-arched doorway. The entrance front has a central two-storey gabled porch.	II
Office and wall, Ainscough's Mill; 53.59975°N 2.83857°W	—	c. 1860	The office is in red brick with stone and stuccoed dressings and a hipped slate roof. It is in Italianate style, with two storeys. The building has an L-shaped plan consisting of a main block with fronts of three bays and a rear wing. The central bay on the entrance front projects forward, it has a dentilled pediment and a round-headed doorway with a fanlight. This is flanked by square bay windows. The other windows vary; some are mullioned, some are sashes, and some are casements. Attached to the office is a brick wall with ashlar coping, about 70 metres (230 ft) long, that contains two gate piers with pyramidal caps.	II
War memorial 53.59980°N 2.84437°W		1921	The war memorial stands in a Garden of Remembrance at a road junction. It is in Cornish granite, it consists of a Celtic-style wheel-head cross, and overall it is about 5 metres (16 ft) high. The memorial has a tapering oblong shaft about 3 metres (9.8 ft) high on a tapering plinth and a base of five octagonal steps. The front of the head and the shaft are decorated with carved knotwork. The plinth and the shaft carry inscriptions and the names of those lost in both World Wars, and on each of the steps is inscribed one of the years of the First World War.	II

== Notes and references ==
=== Sources ===
- Pollard, Richard; Pevsner, Nikolaus (2006), Lancashire: Liverpool and the South-West, The Buildings of England, New Haven and London: Yale University Press, ISBN 0-300-10910-5
- Historic England, "Barn approximately 100 metres southwest of Martin Hall Farmhouse (not included), Burscough (1196636)", National Heritage List for England
- Historic England, "Burscough Hall Farmhouse, Burscough (1220368)", National Heritage List for England
- Historic England, "Lathom's Farmhouse, Burscough (1196634)", National Heritage List for England
- Historic England, "Barton's Farmhouse, Burscough (1297520)", National Heritage List for England
- Historic England, "Crabtree Farmhouse, Burscough (1297518)", National Heritage List for England
- Historic England, "Thatch Cottage, Burscough (1196635)", National Heritage List for England
- Historic England, "Merscar House, Burscough (1196668)", National Heritage List for England
- Historic England, "Hurst Cottage, Burscough (1196632)", National Heritage List for England
- Historic England, "Barn approximately 15 metres south of Wood House Farmhouse, Burscough (1220485)", National Heritage List for England
- Historic England, "Hatherleigh, Burscough (1196665)", National Heritage List for England
- Historic England, "Mill Dam Lane End Farmhouse, Burscough (1196666)", National Heritage List for England
- Historic England, "Wood House Farmhouse, Burscough (1196637)", National Heritage List for England
- Historic England, "Forshaw's Farmhouse, Burscough (1297541)", National Heritage List for England
- Historic England, "Mill Heights, Burscough (1220390)", National Heritage List for England
- Historic England, "Baldwin's Lock and Bridge, Burscough (1220418)", National Heritage List for England
- Historic England, "German's Lock and Bridge, Burscough (1297542)", National Heritage List for England
- Historic England, "Junction Bridge canal basin and former dry dock, Top Locks, Burscough (1297530)", National Heritage List for England
- Historic England, "Prescott Bridge, Burscough (1297519)", National Heritage List for England
- Historic England, "Runnel Brow Bridge (that part in Burscough CP) (1196640)", National Heritage List for England
- Historic England, "Canal lock approximately 50 metres north of Runnel Brow Bridge (that part in Burscough CP) (1220547)", National Heritage List for England
- Historic England, "Top Locks, lower lock (that part in Burscough CP) (1196609)", National Heritage List for England
- Historic England, "Top Locks, upper lock (that part in Burscough CP) (1297531)", National Heritage List for England
- Historic England, "Nos. 172 and 172A Liverpool Road South, Burscough (1196667)", National Heritage List for England
- Historic England, "Martin Lane Bridge, Burscough (1291002)", National Heritage List for England
- Historic England, "Square House, Burscough (1220491)", National Heritage List for England
- Historic England, "Yew Tree House, Burscough (1291001)", National Heritage List for England
- Historic England, "Roman Catholic church of St John with presbytery, Burscough (1220384)", National Heritage List for England
- Historic England, "Junction Bridge at Top Locks, Burscough (1297511)", National Heritage List for England
- Historic England, "Nos. 2 and 4 Merscar Lane, Burscough (1220405)", National Heritage List for England
- Historic England, "Barn approximately 5 metres north of Hurst Cottage, Burscough (1196633)", National Heritage List for England
- Historic England, "Church of St John, Burscough (1220393)", National Heritage List for England
- Historic England, "Barn approximately 10 metres south of Forshaw's Farmhouse, Burscough (1196631)", National Heritage List for England
- Historic England, "Railway Bridge over Leeds and Liverpool Canal at Ainscough's Mill, Burscough (1380271)", National Heritage List for England
- Historic England, "Cottage in field approximately 300m northwest of Anchor Farmhouse (not included), Burscough (1196630)", National Heritage List for England
- Historic England, "Ainscough's Mill, Burscough (1033375)", National Heritage List for England
- Historic England, "Burscough Bridge Railway Station building on north side of track, Burscough (1196638)", National Heritage List for England
- Historic England, "Office at Ainscough's Mill and attached boundary wall, Burscough (1067397)", National Heritage List for England
- Historic England, "Lathom and Burscough War Memorial, Burscough (1438967)", National Heritage List for England
- Historic England, Listed Buildings
