= New Lane railway station =

Railway station in Lancashire, England

New Lane
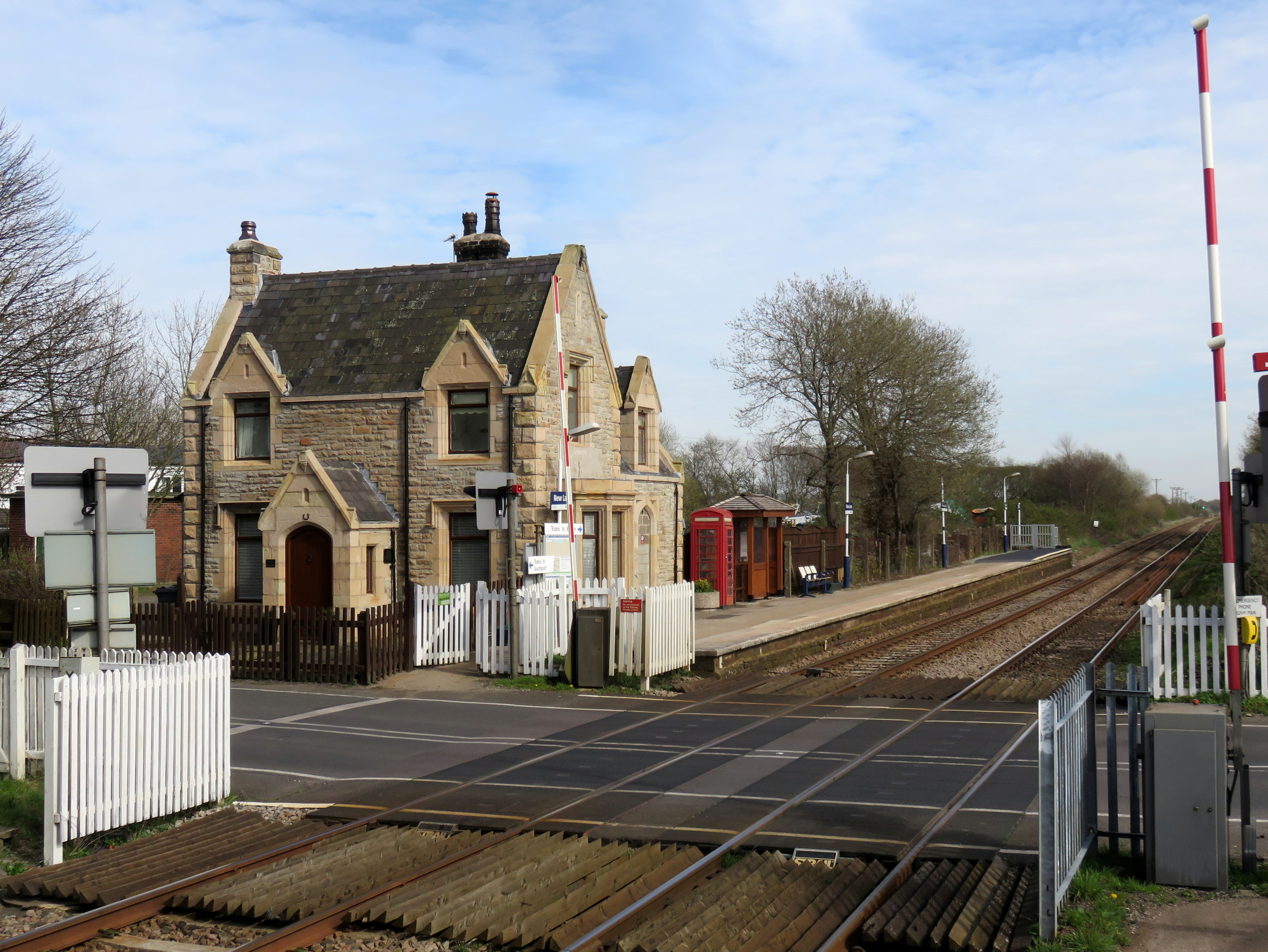
- New Lane railway station in 2015.

General information
- Location: Burscough, West Lancashire; England
- Coordinates: 53.611°N 2.868°W
- Grid reference: SD427131
- Manager: Northern Trains
- Platforms: 2

Other information
- Station code: NLN
- Classification: DfT category F2

History
- Opened: 9 April 1855
- Original company: Lancashire and Yorkshire Railway and East Lancashire Railway jointly
- Pre-grouping: Lancashire and Yorkshire Railway
- Post-grouping: London Midland and Scottish Railway

Passengers
- 2021/22: ▲1,814
- 2022/23: ▲2,188
- 2023/24: ▼1,866
- 2024/25: ▲2,140
- 2025/26: ▲3,028
Location
Notes
- Passenger statistics from the Office of Rail and Road

New Lane railway station serves the town of Burscough in West Lancashire, in England. It is served and managed by Northern Trains and is situated near the Martin Mere bird sanctuary, which can be reached by a 1-mile walk.

The main stone-built station building survives adjacent to the Wigan-bound platform, but is now in use for non-railway purposes (as a private house), modest shelters now being provided on both platforms for rail travellers.

== History ==
The station opened on 9 April 1855 when the Lancashire and Yorkshire Railway (L&YR) and the East Lancashire Railway (ELR) jointly opened the line from Wigan Wallgate to Southport London Street, the line and station had been planned, authorised and construction started by the Manchester and Southport Railway before it was acquired by the L&YR and ELR on 3 July 1854. The main stone-built station building (no longer in use) was built during this time, in the standard L&YR style (albeit on a smaller scale compared with Burscough Bridge]) which had been described as "solid, substantial, well built of stone in the Elizabethan style, neat without undue ornament". The L&YR amalgamated with the London and North Western Railway on 1 January 1922 and in turn was grouped into the London, Midland and Scottish Railway (LMS) in 1923. Nationalisation followed in 1948. When Sectorisation was introduced in the 1980s, the station was served by Regional Railways until the privatisation of British Rail. Like neighbouring Bescar Lane, the station here formerly had its level crossing manually operated from a nearby signal box and both platforms on the same side of the crossing. The present staggered arrangement was introduced when the box was abolished and automatic half barriers installed in the early 1990s.

== Facilities ==
The station is unstaffed and has a ticket machine, tickets can be purchased on the train or prior to travel. Timetable posters and a telephone are provided to give train running information. Step-free access is available to both platforms.

== Services ==
Trains run to Southport and Manchester Victoria via Wigan Wallgate every two hours (with some peak extras). Most eastbound trains continue to Stalybridge.

The last service to Southport is at 21:24 hours with the last service towards Wigan Wallgate and Manchester stations being at 22:32. There is no Sunday service, though a normal service operates on most bank holidays.

== Bibliography ==
- Grant, Donald J. (2017). Directory of the Railway Companies of Great Britain (1st ed.). Kibworth Beauchamp, Leicestershire: Troubador Publishing Ltd. ISBN 978-1-78803-768-6.
- Marshall, John (1969). The Lancashire & Yorkshire Railway. Vol. 1. Newton Abbot: David & Charles. ISBN 978-0-7153-4352-4.
- Quick, Michael (2023) [2001]. Railway passenger stations in Great Britain: a chronology (PDF). version 5.05. Railway & Canal Historical Society.

Preceding station	National Rail	Following station
Bescar Lane	Northern Trains; Manchester–Southport line	Burscough Bridge
