= Bescar Lane railway station =

Railway station in Lancashire, England

Coordinates: 53.624°N 2.915°W

Bescar Lane
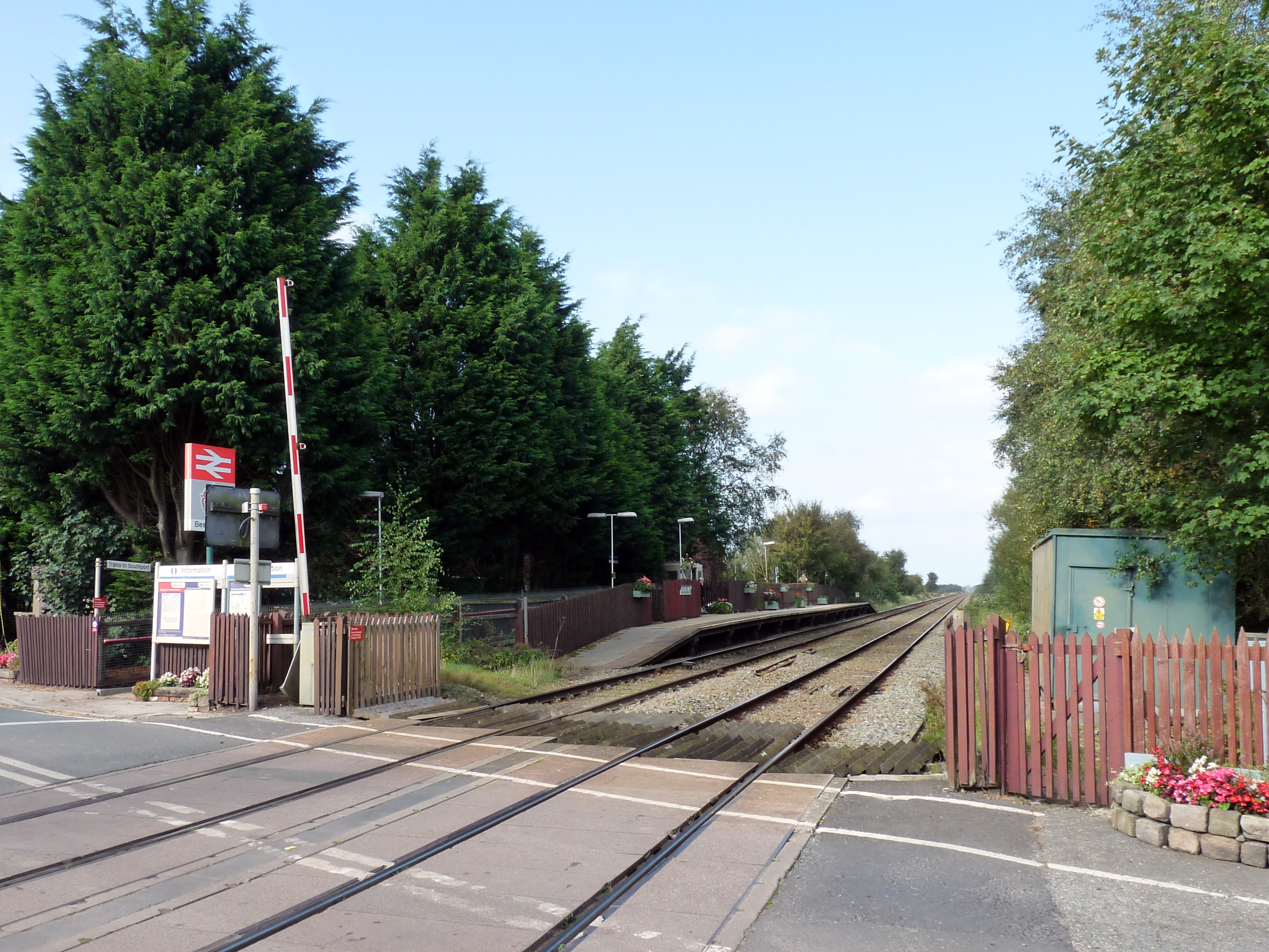

General information
- Location: Scarisbrick, West Lancashire; England
- Grid reference: SD396145
- Manager: Northern Trains
- Platforms: 2

Other information
- Station code: BES
- Classification: DfT category F2

History
- Opened: 9 April 1855
- Original company: Lancashire and Yorkshire Railway and East Lancashire Railway jointly
- Pre-grouping: Lancashire and Yorkshire Railway

Passengers
- 2021/22: ▲2,516
- 2022/23: ▼2,190
- 2023/24: ▲2,304
- 2024/25: ▲2,442
- 2025/26: ▲3,074
Location
Notes
- Passenger statistics from the Office of Rail and Road

Bescar Lane railway station is on the Manchester to Southport Line, 4 1/2 miles (7.2 km) east of Southport in the village of Scarisbrick. Bescar Lane is an old cottage-style station, operated by Northern Trains. Its remote location, some distance from the centre of Scarisbrick Parish, is considered to be "problematic".

== History ==
The station opened on 9 April 1855 when the Lancashire and Yorkshire Railway (L&YR) and the East Lancashire Railway (ELR) jointly opened the line from Wigan Wallgate to Southport London Street, the line and station had been planned, authorised and construction started by the Manchester and Southport Railway before it was acquired by the L&YR and ELR on 3 July 1854. The main stone-built station building was built during this time, in the standard L&YR style which had been described as "solid, substantial, well built of stone in the Elizabethan style, neat without undue ornament".The station had the distinction of being the lowest station on that network, situated 12 feet 6 inches (3.8 m) above sea-level. The L&YR amalgamated with the London and North Western Railway on 1 January 1922 and in turn was grouped into the London, Midland and Scottish Railway (LMS) in 1923. Nationalisation followed in 1948. Part of the line running from Bescar Lane directly to Southport through Blowick and St Luke's closed in 1965, in order to enable the closure of the level crossing on a busy road at Blowick, causing trains to divert through Meols Cop on a section of the old Liverpool, Southport and Preston Junction Railway. When Sectorisation was introduced in the 1980s, the station was served by Regional Railways until the privatisation of British Rail.

The station's level crossing was controlled by a signal box until the early 1990s, but this was closed and demolished after automatic barriers were installed and the fixed signals removed. The platform layout has also been altered, with the westbound platform moved to the opposite side of the crossing – previously both platforms were sited on the eastern side (the redundant one can still be seen).

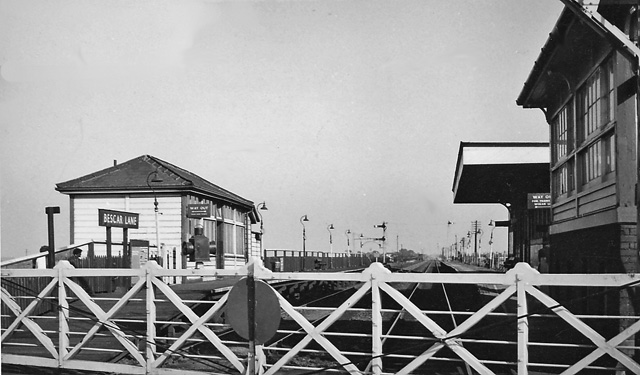
Bescar Lane railway station in 1966

== Facilities ==
The station is unstaffed and has no ticket machine, so all tickets must be purchased in advance or on the train. There are shelters on each platform, but no other permanent buildings. Train running information can be obtained from timetable posters or by telephone. Step-free access is available on both platforms.

== Services ==
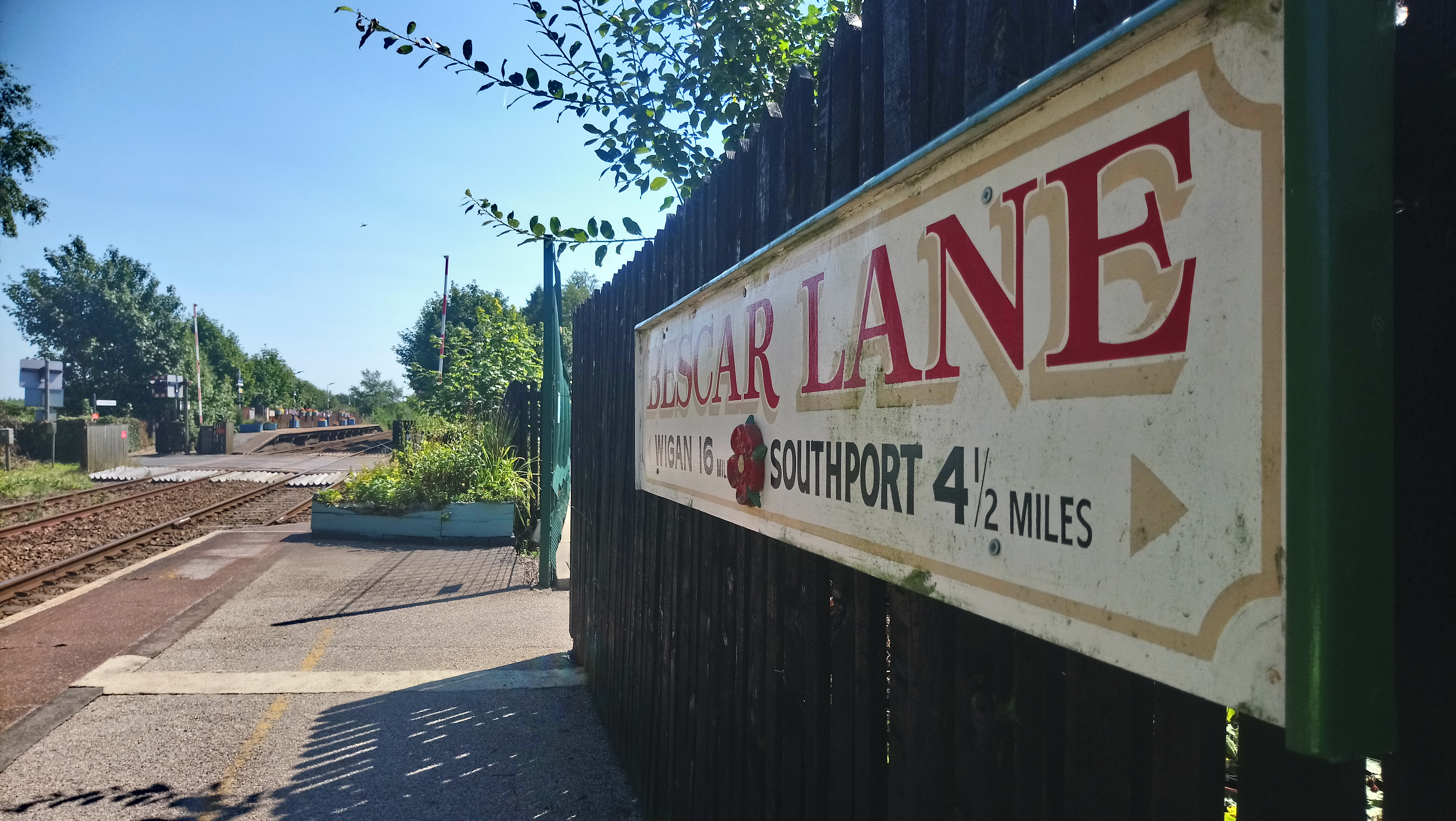
Bescar Lane Railway Station in Lancashire

Monday to Saturdays there is generally a two-hourly service to Southport westbound and Manchester Victoria via Wigan Wallgate and Bolton eastbound. Most of these continue to Stalybridge.

The last service to Southport is at 21:29 and the last service towards Wigan Wallgate and Manchester stations is at 22:28. There is no Sunday service, though a normal service operates on most Bank Holidays.

== Bibliography ==
- Grant, Donald J. (2017). Directory of the Railway Companies of Great Britain (1st ed.). Kibworth Beauchamp, Leicestershire: Troubador Publishing Ltd. ISBN 978-1-78803-768-6.
- Marshall, John (1969). The Lancashire & Yorkshire Railway. Vol. 1. Newton Abbot: David & Charles. ISBN 978-0-7153-4352-4.
- Quick, Michael (2023) [2001]. Railway passenger stations in Great Britain: a chronology (PDF). version 5.05. Railway & Canal Historical Society.

Preceding station	National Rail	Following station
Meols Cop	Northern Trains; Manchester–Southport line	New Lane
	Disused railways	
Blowick; Line and station closed	Lancashire and Yorkshire Railway; Manchester and Southport Railway	New Lane; Line and station open
