= Hoscar =

Village in Lancashire, England

Coordinates: 53.602°N 2.808°W

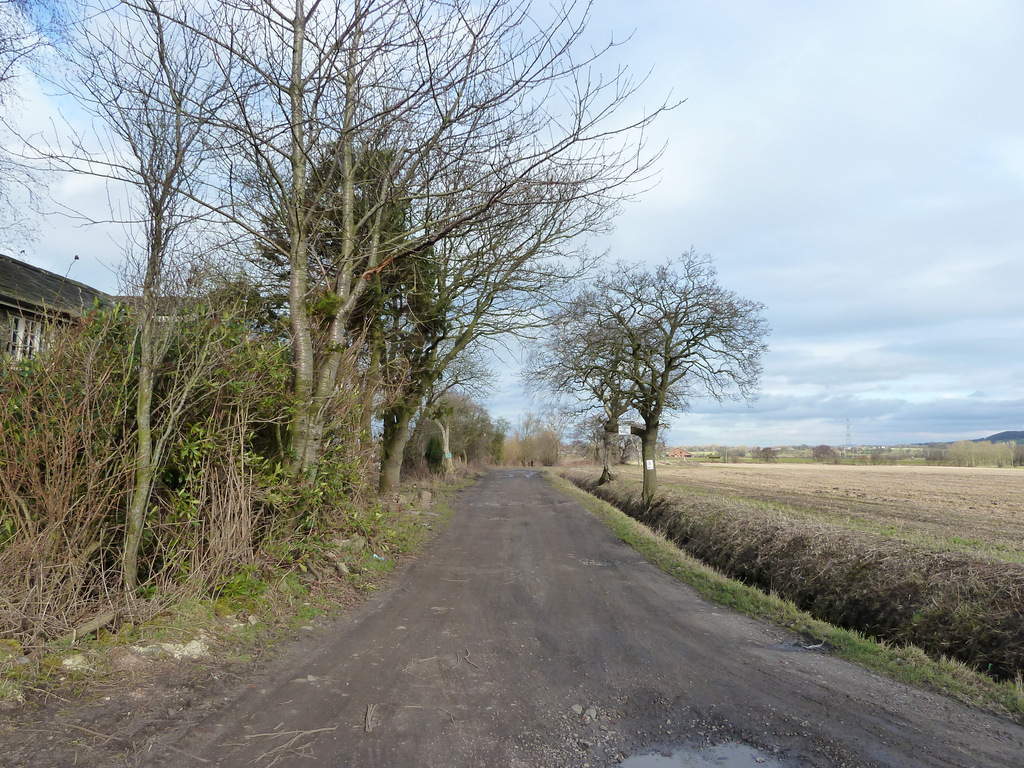
- Path at the end of Bleak Lane

- Location in West Lancashire Location within Lancashire
- OS grid reference: SD465120
- Civil parish: Lathom
- District: West Lancashire
- Shire county: Lancashire
- Region: North West
- Country: England
- Sovereign state: United Kingdom
- Post town: ORMSKIRK
- Postcode district: L40
- Dialling code: 01704
- Police: Lancashire
- Fire: Lancashire
- Ambulance: North West
- UK Parliament: West Lancashire

Hoscar is a small village in Lancashire, England. It is located 1¼ miles (2 km) east of the larger village of Burscough.

== Toponymy ==
The name Hoscar is derived from the Old Norse hross or Old English hors and kjarr (marshland), again from the Old Norse. An early recorded form is Horsecarr (1347).

== Geography ==
The village is bounded to the north east by the River Douglas, and to the south is the Leeds and Liverpool Canal. To the north west is the moss from which the village derives its name. Parts of the moss are only 20 feet above sea level.

== Worship ==
St Cyprian's Mission Church, built in 1767, is located on Hoscar Moss Road and is open for services. It is a mission church for St John the Baptist, Burscough. There is also a former Wesleyan Methodist chapel, founded before 1892 that is now a private house, also located on Hoscar Moss Road.

== Farming and agriculture ==
Many different methods of agriculture have been practiced in Hoscar and its surrounding areas. These include; turf cultivation, arable crops and grazing for both cattle and sheep.

Farms

- Bleak Hall Farm
- Tyrer's Farm
- Hoscar Hall Farm
- Sandyway's Farm
- Moss Grove Farm - formerly a poultry farm, now renamed Moss Grove Cottage and since 2012 derelict.
- Stock's Farm
- Snipe Hall Farm - most notably featured in the English land law case 'Smith and Snipes Hall Farm Ltd v River Douglas Catchment Board'

== Transport ==
The village is served by Hoscar railway station. The station once boasted a goods yard which was used by local farmers to get their crops to the markets of Wigan, Manchester and Southport quickly.
