= Southport gas holder =

Structure in Southport, England

Coordinates: 53.642°N 2.965°W

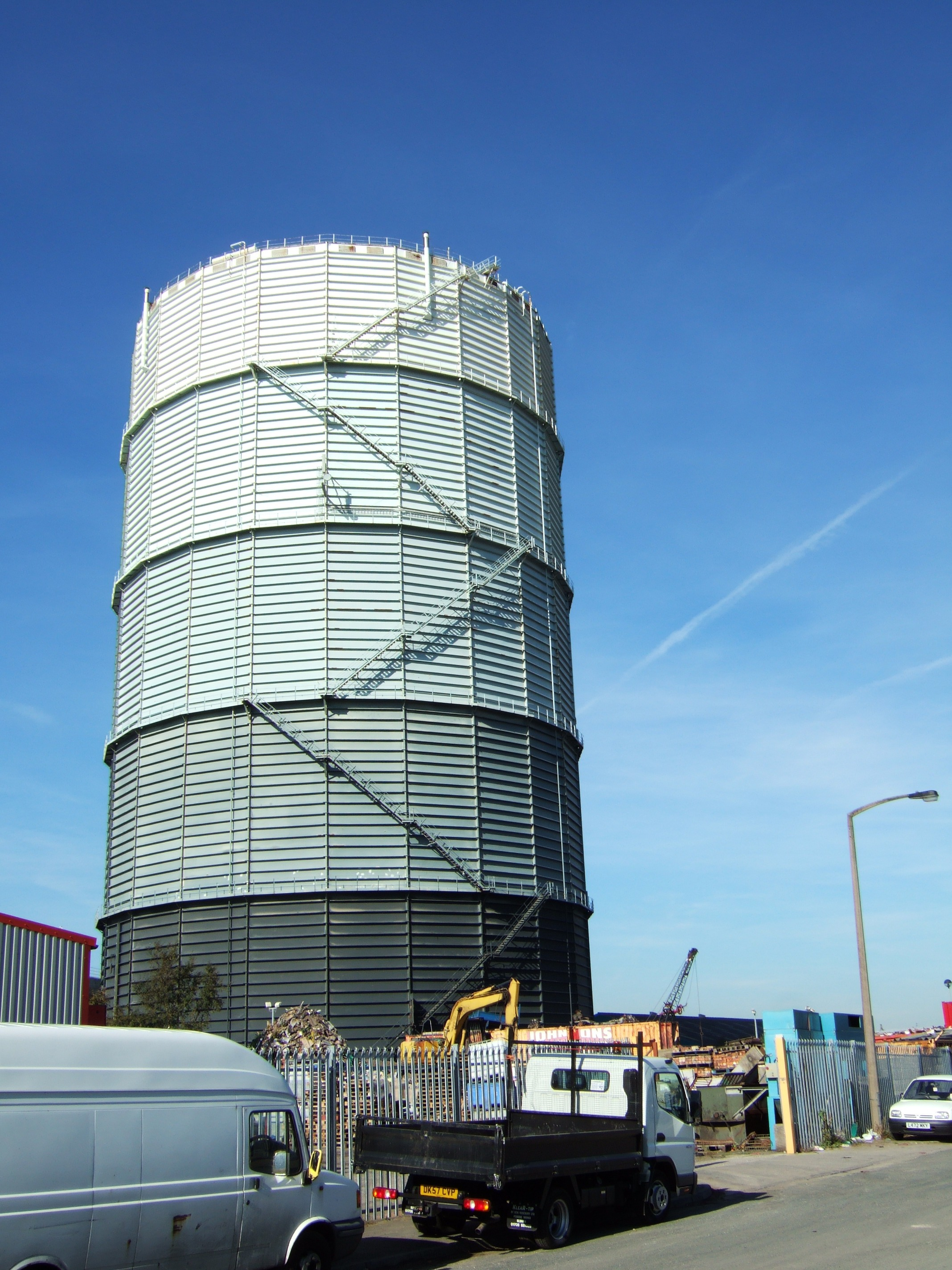
10 October 2007

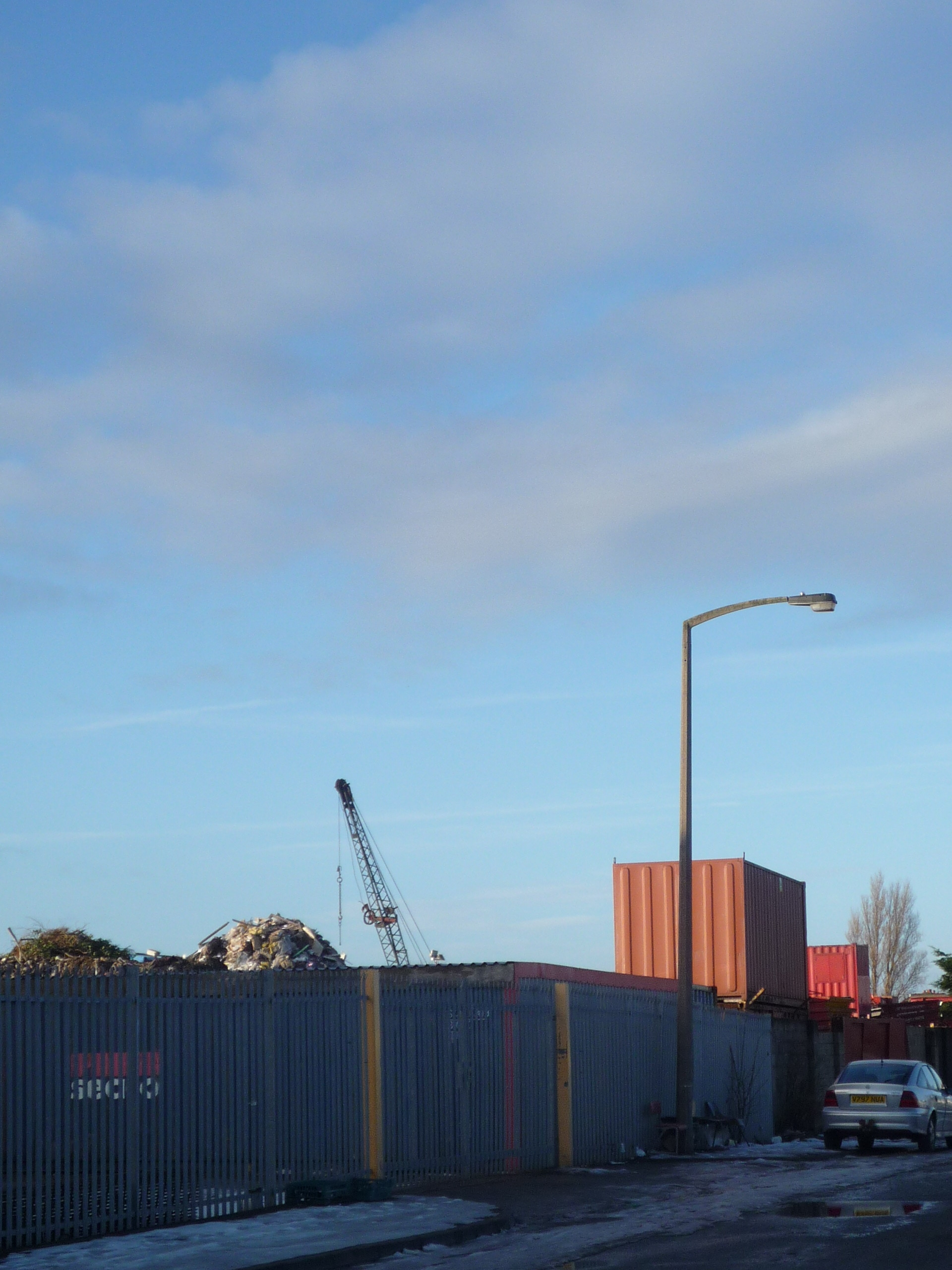
26 December 2009

Southport Gas Holder was once the tallest structure in the northern town of Southport, England for 40 years. The 84.5 m (277 ft) high structure could be seen from miles around, for example from Blackpool and Winter Hill. To some people of the local area it was an instantly recognisable symbol of home coming after being away for weeks. It was built in 1969 in the Blowick area of Southport (1.7 miles from the town centre) – grid reference SD362167. It acted as a storage unit guaranteeing the town's gas supply. Similar structures were built across the country when town gas was generated from coal and before the construction of a high pressure gas grid.

== Decommission and destruction ==
The largest tower was decommissioned in January 2008, due to an environmental risk posed by the storage of oil within it. Discussions soon came as it was decommissioned and just weeks later it was decided by National Grid plc, that two out of the three gas holders (including the largest) would be completely demolished as soon as mid-2009. This sparked mixed reviews. Some people thought that the tower was a symbol of Southport, and should not be destroyed. Others however (mostly those who lived directly in the shadow of the tower) disagreed and could not wait to see the back of it. The tower caused problems for local residents such as poor TV reception.

On Tuesday 14 April, demolition men arrived to start dismantling the 1,100 tonne structure. The second largest crane in Britain came to dismantle the iconic structure and in less than seven weeks it was gone from the Southport skyline forever. The gas holder may be the largest structure the town will ever see.

== The future ==
After the destruction of the tower there was a mixed reaction from the local residents, some felt they had lost an icon while others felt the tower was an eyesore, and the removal may even affect house prices. The future of the third holder is still uncertain due to costs of removal. 'Ground Zero', how some people like to call the site where the gas tower once was, has yet to be developed but it is said it will be either housing and/or for business use. Some people have suggested that there should be something to remember the gas tower, but this idea has not yet been agreed on.
