= St John the Baptist Church, Burscough =

Coordinates: 53.6045°N 2.8403°W

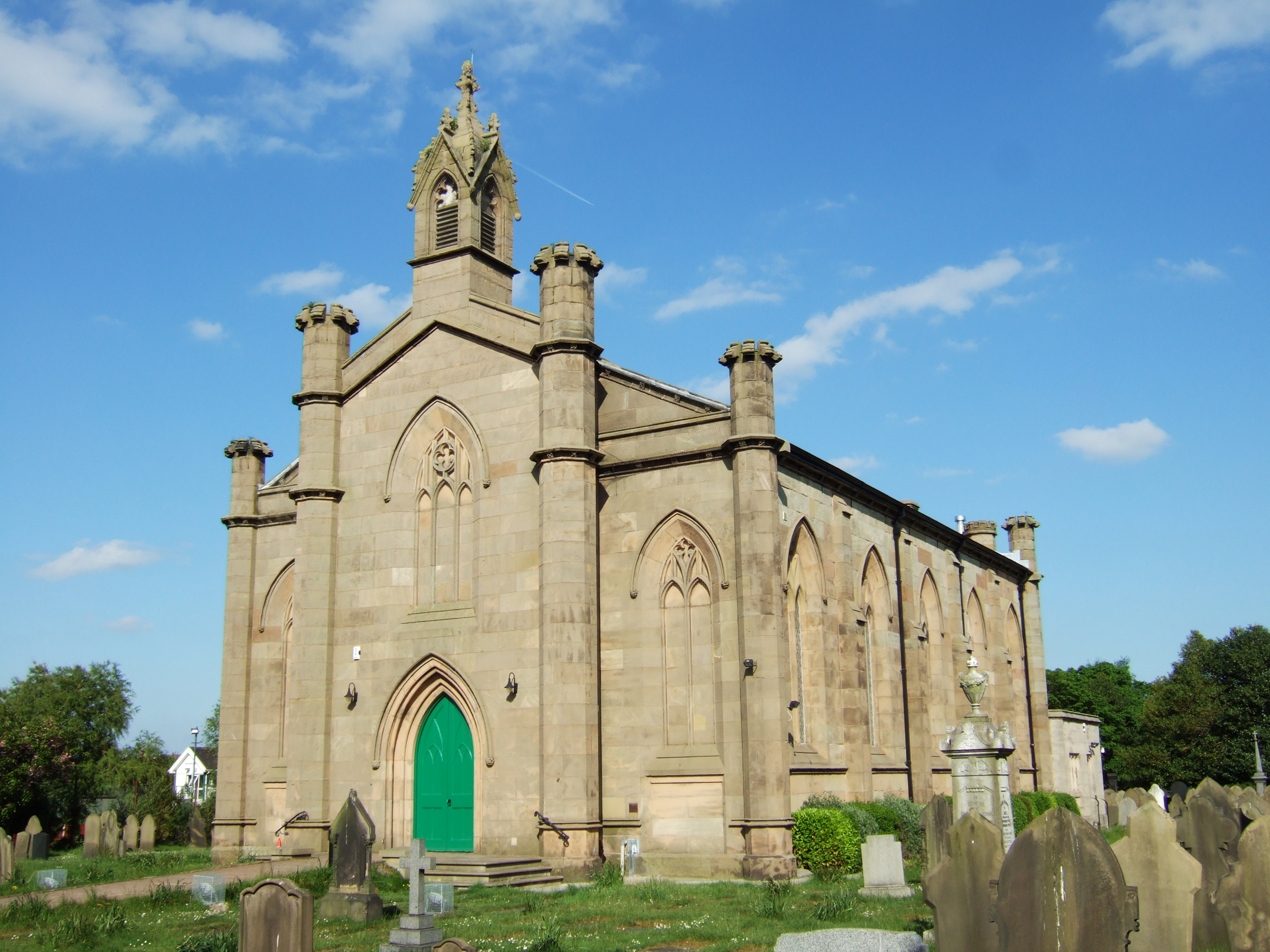
- St John the Baptist Church, Burscough, from the northwest

- Location in West Lancashire
- OS grid reference: SD 445 123
- Location: Liverpool Road North, Burscough, Lancashire
- Country: England
- Denomination: Anglican
- Website: St John the Baptist

History
- Status: Parish church

Architecture
- Functional status: Active
- Heritage designation: Grade II*
- Designated: 11 August 1972
- Architect(s): Daniel Stewart; William Waddington and Sons
- Architectural type: Church
- Style: Gothic Revival
- Groundbreaking: 1829
- Completed: c. 1932
- Construction cost: £3,440 (£330,000 in 2025)

Specifications
- Materials: Sandstone, slate roofs

Administration
- Province: York
- Diocese: Liverpool
- Archdeaconry: Warrington
- Deanery: Ormskirk
- Parish: St John, Burscough Bridge

Clergy
- Vicar: Revd Elliott Ireton

St John the Baptist Church is in Liverpool Road North, Burscough, Lancashire, England. It is an active Anglican parish church in the deanery of Ormskirk, the archdeaconry of Warrington, and the diocese of Liverpool. Its benefice has been united with those of St Andrew, Burscough Bridge, St Cyprian, Burscough Bridge, and Oaks, Burscough Bridge. The church is recorded in the National Heritage List for England as a designated Grade II* listed building. It was a Commissioners' church, having received a grant towards its construction from the Church Building Commission.

== History ==
The church was built between 1829 and 1832 to a design by Daniel Stewart. A grant of £3,040 (equivalent to £290,000 in 2025) was given towards its construction by the Church Building Commission. The total cost of its construction of the church was £3,440. Galleries were inserted on three sides in 1857. In 1887–89 the chancel was added by William Waddington and Sons, and in about 1932 the south vestry was built.

== Architecture ==
St John's is constructed in ashlar sandstone, with a slate roof. Its architectural style is Gothic Revival. The plan consists of a five-bay nave, and a chancel with a vestry to the south. The west front is gabled, and is divided into three bays by four polygonal buttresses that rise to octagonal embattled turrets. On the apex of the gable is a bellcote with louvred bell openings over which are gablets. It has an ogival top surmounted by a crocketed pinnacle. In the centre bay is an arched doorway, above which is a blind three-light window. In each lateral bay is a blind two-light window. The bays along the sides of the church are divided by buttresses, and each contains a two-light window. On the corners of the chancel are turrets, its side windows have two lights, and the east window has five lights.

== See also ==
- Grade II* listed buildings in Lancashire
- Listed buildings in Burscough
- List of Commissioners' churches in Northeast and Northwest England
