= Blowick railway station =

Disused railway station in Blowick, Merseyside

Coordinates: 53.63851°N 2.97151°W

Blowick
- Blowick railway station circa 1910.

General information
- Location: Blowick, Sefton; England
- Grid reference: SD358162
- Platforms: 2

Other information
- Status: Disused

History
- Original company: Manchester and Southport Railway
- Pre-grouping: Lancashire and Yorkshire Railway
- Post-grouping: London, Midland and Scottish Railway

Key dates
- early 1871: Opened as Cop End
- 1 October 1871: Renamed Blowick
- 25 September 1939: Closed
Location

Blowick railway station was on the Manchester and Southport Railway in the Blowick suburb of Southport, Merseyside. Situated on a level crossing on Meols Cop Road (B5276), the station opened as Cop End in early 1871, and was renamed Blowick on 1 October 1871. The station closed on 25 September 1939, and this section of the line closed on 14 June 1965, forcing trains to divert through Meols Cop on a section of the old Liverpool, Southport and Preston Junction Railway.

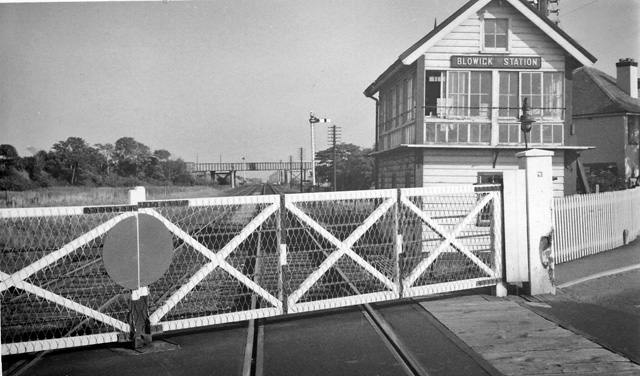
Site of Blowick railway station in 1964.

Preceding station	Disused railways	Following station
Southport Chapel Street until 1883; Line closed, station open	Lancashire and Yorkshire Railway; Manchester and Southport Railway	Bescar Lane; Line closed, station open
St Luke's from 1883; Line and station closed	Lancashire and Yorkshire Railway; Manchester and Southport Railway	Bescar Lane; Line closed, station open
