= Manchester and Southport Railway =

Early British railway company

Overview
- Locale: Greater Manchester; Lancashire; Merseyside; North West England
- Dates of operation: 22 July 1847–3 July 1854

Technical
- Track gauge: 1,435 mm (4 ft 8 1/2 in) standard gauge

Manchester and Southport Railway Act 1847
- Act of Parliament
- Parliament of the United Kingdom
- Long title: An Act for making a Railway from Southport through Wigan to Pendleton near Manchester, with several Branches, to be called "The Manchester and Southport Railway."
- Citation: 10 & 11 Vict. c. ccxxi

Dates
- Royal assent: 22 July 1847

Text of statute as originally enacted

The Manchester and Southport Railway in England was formed by the Manchester and Southport Railway Act 1847 (10 & 11 Vict. c. ccxxi) of 22 July 1847 to link Manchester and Southport. (Note: An Act for making a Railway from Southport through Wigan to Pendleton near Manchester, with several Branches, to be called "The Manchester and Southport Railway.") Before the line opened it was acquired jointly by the Lancashire and Yorkshire Railway (L&YR) and the East Lancashire Railway (ELR) on 3 July 1854. (Note: An Act for vesting in the East Lancashire Railway Company jointly with the Lancashire and Yorkshire Railway Company certain Parts of the Manchester and Southport Railway and of the Lancashire and Yorkshire Railway; and for other Purposes.)

== Wigan area ==
The line was opened in several sections. The first 3 miles (4.8 km) were constructed in Wigan when on 20 November 1848 the L&YR opened its line from Walton Junction (in north Liverpool) to Lostock Junction on the L&YR line between Salford and Preston. (Note: This line had been planned and construction started by Liverpool and Bury Railway before it was acquired by the Manchester and Leeds Railway in 1846 which in turn merged with others to become the L&YR in 1847.) There were two stations on this section, Wigan and Hindley. Another station was opened later, on 1 June 1863, at Ince.

== Southport end ==
The second section of line to open was on 9 April 1855 from Wigan to Southport London Street, the first part of this line to Burscough Bridge was wholly owned by the L&YR, the remainder was jointly owned by the L&YR and the East Lancashire Railway (ELR). The delay in opening this section was due to L&YR finding itself in "severe financial difficulties" and it took the issue of a mandamus to spur the L&YR into action.

There were six stations on this section, described as "solid, substantial, well built of stone in the Elizabethan style, neat without undue ornament", on this section, Gathurst, Appley Bridge, Newburgh (which became Parbold), Burscough Bridge, New Lane and Bescar Lane.

The line terminated at the ELR Southport London Street station which was still under construction at the time. Operations were transferred to Southport Chapel Street in 1857 with London Street station firstly becoming a 'repairing shed' (according to the 1894 Ordnance Survey), then becoming a goods station and ultimately being absorbed into Chapel Street station when it was rebuilt in 1914. Other stations were opened later, Cop End (which became Blowick) on 1 April 1870 and Hoscar Moss on 1 November 1870. Finally Barton Street opened on 1 July 1883, this station became St Luke's and sometimes St Luke's Road. (Note: Barton Street had two sets of platforms one set on the lines to Wigan and another set almost at right-angles on the West Lancashire Railway line to Preston Fishergate Hill.)

== Manchester end ==
The route utilised some existing infrastructure at its Manchester end. The line from Manchester Victoria to Salford Central was opened in 1844, prior to that the Manchester, Bolton and Bury Canal Company had opened a line in 1838 from Salford Central to Bolton Trinity Street and this line was utilised as far as Windsor Bridge, near the site of the present day Salford Crescent station.

A new line was constructed from Windsor Bridge junction to Hindley where it joined the existing line to Bolton and Bury, the former Liverpool and Bury Railway. This line opened in sections, firstly on 13 June 1887 from Windsor Bridge to Swinton with stations at Pendleton Broad Street, Pendlebury and Swinton, Irlams o' th' Height was opened later in 1901.

The next section opened a year later on 2 July 1888, it ran as far as Atherton Central with stations at Moorside and Wardley, Walkden and Atherton Central.

The final section of line from Atherton Central to Crow Nest Junction, just before Hindley station opened on 1 October 1888, there were stations at Hag Fold and Daisy Hill.

== Subsequent ownership ==
The ELR was acquired by the L&YR on 13 August 1859 and from then the whole line was owned by the L&YR. (Note: An Act for the Amalgamation of the East Lancashire Railway Company with the Lancashire and Yorkshire Railway Company, and for other Purposes.)

The route is still in use to day as Northern's Manchester to Southport Line.

== Acts of Parliament ==
=== Line of railway ===
And be it enacted, That the Railways to be made under the Authority of this Act shall be the following; that is to say,

- Firstly, a Railway commencing on the South-easterly Side of Chapel Street, and within the Distance of One hundred and fifty Yards from London Street in the Town of Southport in the Township of North Meols in the Parish of North Meols in the County of Lancaster, and terminating at and by a Junction with the Part of the Manchester and Leeds Railway heretofore called or known by the Name of the Manchester, Bolton, and Bury Railway in a Field belonging to Her Majesty the Queen in right of Her Duchy of Lancaster in the Township of Pendleton in the Parish of Eccles and said County of Lancaster on the Southerly Side of and at the Distance of Twenty Yards from the Two-and-a-Quarter-Mile Post from the Salford Terminus of the said Manchester, Bolton, and Bury Railway:
- Secondly, a Branch Railway commencing and diverging from and out of the proposed Railway firstly herein-before described in a Field in the said Township of Lathom and Parish of Ormskirk in the County of Lancaster occupied by John Hesketh, and abutting on the Westerly Side thereof to the Turnpike Road from Liverpool to Preston, and on Part of the Southerly Side thereof to Saint John's Churchyard in the said Township of Lathom, and terminating at and by a Junction with the proposed Railway now or heretofore called the Liverpool, Ormskirk, and Preston Railway at the Point of Intersection by the said Liverpool, Ormskirk, and Preston Railway of the Leeds and Liverpool Canal and Towing Path in the said Township of Lathom and Parish of Ormskirk and County of Lancaster, and another Branch Railway commencing and diverging from and out of the proposed Railway firstly herein-before described in the said Field in the Township of Lathom and Parish of Ormskirk in the County of Lancaster occupied by the said John Hesketh, and terminating at and by a Junction with the said Liverpool, Ormskirk, and Preston Railway in a Field in the said Township of Lathom numbered 250 in the said Township of Lathom on the original Plan of the said Liverpool, Ormskirk, and Preston Railway deposited with the Clerk of the Peace for the County of Lancaster in the Year One thousand eight hundred and forty-five, and on or before the Thirtieth Day of November in such Year:
- Thirdly, a Branch Railway diverging from or out of the proposed Railway firstly herein-before described in a Field of which John Walmesley Esquire is the Owner, and John Thompson Lessee or Tenant, and occupied by John Caldwell, situate in the Township of Wigan and Parish of Wigan in the County of Lancaster, and on the South-westerly Side of and adjoining the North Union Railway at the Point between the Wallgate and Frog Lane in Wigan where the proposed Railway firstly herein-before described will cross or intersect the Line of the said North Union Railway there, and terminating at and by a Junction with the Portion of the Manchester and Leeds Railway heretofore called the Liverpool and Bury Railway in a Field in the Township of Pemberton in the Parish of Wigan in the County of Lancaster occupied by Ann Ackers, and numbered 100 in the said Township of Pemberton on the original Plan of the said Liverpool and Bury Railway (on such Plan called the Bolton, Wigan, and Liverpool Railway,) deposited with the Clerk of the Peace for the County of Lancaster in the Year One thousand eight hundred and forty-four:
- Fourthly, a Branch Railway diverging from or out of the proposed Railway firstly herein-before described on the South-easterly Side of the Town of Wigan at the River Douglas in the Township and Parish of Wigan and County of Lancaster, numbered 13 in the said Township of Wigan on the original Plan of the Wigan Branch Railway (now incorporated into and forming Part of the North Union Railway) deposited with the Clerk of the Peace of the County of Lancaster, and terminating at and by a Junction with the Part of the North Union Railway formerly called the Wigan Branch Railway opposite the Wigan Goods or Merchandize Station of the North Union Railway in a Field numbered 12 in the said Township of Wigan on the said original Plan of the said Wigan Branch Railway so deposited as aforesaid:
- Fifthly, a Branch Railway diverging out of or from the proposed Railway firstly herein-before described in a Field in the Township of Ince-in-Makerfield in the Parish of Wigan in the County of Lancaster of which William Gidlow is the Owner and Occupier, on the South-easterly Side of and adjoining to the New Springs Branch of the North Union Railway at the Point where the proposed Railway will cross or intersect the said New Springs Branch Railway, and terminating at and by a Junction with the Portion of the Manchester and Leeds Railway now or heretofore called the Liverpool and Bury Railway on Amberswood Common in the Township of Ince-in-Makerfield in the Parish of Wigan in the County of Lancaster, numbered 57 in the said Township of Ince-in-Makerfield on the said original Plan of the said last-mentioned Railway deposited with the Clerk of the Peace for the County of Lancaster, and on the South-westerly Side of and at the Distance of One hundred Yards from the Turnpike Road over the said Common:
- Sixthly, a Branch Railway commencing by a Junction with the proposed Railway firstly herein-before described in a Field called the Crabtree Hey in the Township of Hindley in the Parish of Wigan and County of Lancaster, occupied by Elizabeth Dorning, and terminating at and by a Junction with the Part of the North Union Railway formerly called the Wigan Branch Railway near the Leigh Branch of the Leeds and Liverpool Canal in a Field in the Township of Ince-in-Makerfield in the Parish of Wigan and County of Lancaster numbered 66 in the said Township of Ince-in-Makerfield on the said original Plan of the said Wigan Branch Railway so deposited as aforesaid:
- Seventhly, a Branch Railway diverging from or out of the proposed Railway firstly herein-before described in a Field in the said Township of Hindley occupied by Timothy Ogden near to the Point of Intersection by such proposed Railway of the Boundary between the Township of Hindley in the Parish of Wigan and the Township of Westhoughton in the Parish of Dean, all in the County of Lancaster, and terminating on the North-westerly Side of a Lane called Pungle Lane situate in the Township of Westhoughton in the Parish of Dean in the County of Lancaster in a Field in the said Township of Westhoughton occupied by Ellen Gregory, and known by the Name of Boggart Housefield:
- Eighthly, a Branch Railway diverging from or out of the proposed Railway firstly herein-before described in a Field in the Township of Atherton in the Parish of Leigh in the County of Lancaster, now or lately occupied by James Higson, abutting on the North-easterly Side thereof to Premises in Atherton aforesaid, of which the Executors of the late Alexander Hay are Lessees, and on the South-easterly Side thereof to the Bolton and Saint Helen's Turnpike Road in the Township of Atherton, and terminating at and by a Junction with the Portion of the London and North-western Railway heretofore called the Bolton and Leigh Railway at the Bag Lane Station of such last-mentioned Railway in the Township of Atherton in the Parish of Leigh and County of Lancaster:
- Ninthly, a Branch Railway diverging out of or from the proposed Railway firstly herein-before described within the Curtilege of Three Cottages and Gardens in the several Occupations of Stanley Kaye, James Green, and Peter Cunliffe, situate in the Township of Shackerley otherwise Tyldesley-cum-Shackerley in the Parish of Leigh in the County of Lancaster, and terminating at and by a Junction with the Portion of the London and North-western Railway heretofore called the Liverpool and Manchester Railway on the Easterly Side of and at the Distance of Twenty Chains from the Barton Moss Station of such last-mentioned Railway on Barton Moss in the Township of Barton-upon-Irwell in the Parish of Eccles in the County of Lancaster:
- Tenthly, a Branch Railway diverging from or out of the proposed Branch Railway lastly herein-before described in a Field called the Well Field occupied by David Grundy, situate in the Township of Tyldesley otherwise Tyldesley-cum-Shackerley in the Parish of Leigh in the County of Lancaster, and terminating in a certain Field called the Berry Field occupied by Malcolm Nugent Ross Esquire, situate in the said Township of Tyldesley otherwise Tyldesley-cum-Shackerley in the Parish of Leigh in the County of Lancaster:
- Eleventhly, a Branch Railway commencing at and by a Junction with the proposed Railway firstly herein-before described on the Little Common in the said Township of Tyldesley otherwise Tyldesley-cum-Shackerley and Parish of Leigh, and on the South-westerly Side of and near to the Carriage Road leading over the said Common from the Village of Tyldesley to Shackerley Hall, and terminating in a Field called the Marled Field, Part of the Moss Farm, situate in the Township of Middle Hulton in the Parish of Dean in the County of Lancaster, occupied by the Trustees of the late Duke of Bridgewater; and a Spur or Branch Railway diverging therefrom or thereout in a Field called the Great Meadow, Part of the Paddiham Farm, situate in the Township of Shackerley otherwise Tyldesley-cum-Shackerley in the Parish of Leigh in the County of Lancaster, adjoining the Wash Lane there, and occupied by Henry Smith, and terminating in a Field called the Hill, occupied by William Ford Hulton Esquire, situate on the Westerly Side of and adjoining to the Bolton and Saint Helen's Turnpike Road, and in the Township of Over Hulton in the Parish of Dean in the County of Lancaster:
- Twelfthly, a Branch Railway commencing at and by a Junction by means of a Fork with the proposed Railway firstly hereinbefore described in a Field called the Longcroft in the Township of Worsley in the Parish of Eccles and County of Lancaster, occupied by Elizabeth Smith, near to a Coal Pit called Sanderson's Pit, and (after crossing over such proposed Railway) terminating in a Field called Moreton Moss, Part of the Wardley Hall Estate in the Township of Worsley in the Parish of Eccles and County of Lancaster, occupied by Peter Nightingale.

— Section 15, Manchester and Southport Railway Act 1847 (10 & 11 Vict. c. ccxxi)

== Bibliography ==
- Brown, Joe (2021). Liverpool & Manchester Railway Atlas. Manchester: Crécy Publishing. ISBN 9780860936879. OCLC 1112373294.
- Grant, Donald J. (2017). Directory of the Railway Companies of Great Britain (1st ed.). Kibworth Beauchamp, Leicestershire: Troubador Publishing Ltd. ISBN 978-1-78803-768-6.
- Greville, M. D. (1981). Chronology of the Railways of Lancashire and Cheshire (Revised and Combined ed.). Railway & Canal Historical Society. ISBN 0-901461-30-X.
- Marshall, John (1969). The Lancashire & Yorkshire Railway. Vol. 1. Newton Abbot: David & Charles. ISBN 978-0-7153-4352-4.
- Marshall, John (1970). The Lancashire & Yorkshire Railway. Vol. 2. Newton Abbot: David & Charles. ISBN 978-0-7153-4906-9.
- Quick, Michael (2023) [2001]. Railway passenger stations in Great Britain: a chronology (PDF). version 5.05. Railway & Canal Historical Society.
