= Meols Cop High School =

Coordinates: 53.639°N 2.974°W

- Meols Cop Road; Southport, Merseyside, PR8 6JS; England

Information
- Type: Academy
- Motto: Brokering Aspirations
- Established: 1941
- Local authority: Sefton
- Trust: Southport Learning Trust
- Department for Education URN: 149828 Tables
- Ofsted: Reports
- Head teacher: Martin Davis
- Gender: Coeducational
- Age: 11 to 16
- Enrolment: 901 as of March 2023
- Website: https://www.meolscophighschool.co.uk/

Meols Cop High School (often abbreviated to MCHS) is a coeducational secondary school located in Southport, Merseyside, England. The school was opened in 1941 and originally consisted of two separate single sex secondary modern schools. One half of the building accommodated the girls and one half the boys – the hall was shared.

In 1979 the two schools amalgamated to form Meols Cop High School under the leadership of Alan Hall, the boy's secondary modern head teacher. The school now has over 900 students and the current head teacher is Mr M Davis as of January 2024.

The school subjects consist of Maths, English, Science, History, Geography, Religious education, Physical education, Personal social development, Business studies, Art, Food Technology, Design Technology, Computing, Resistant Materials, Dance, Drama, Music, and Spanish.

In the most recent Ofsted report of February 2023. The school was found to be 'Good' in all areas. In 2012, Ofsted reported the school as being 'Outstanding' in all areas.

As of 2017, Meols Cop High School is a member of the Education Endowment Foundation's Research Schools Network.

Previously a community school administered by Sefton Metropolitan Borough Council, in April 2023 Meols Cop High School converted to academy status. The school is now sponsored by the Southport Learning Trust.
