= Southport London Street railway station =

Former railway station in Merseyside

Southport London Street

General information
- Location: Southport, Metropolitan Borough of Sefton; England
- Coordinates: 53.6454°N 2.9999°W
- Grid reference: SD339170

Other information
- Status: Disused

History
- Opened: 9 April 1855
- Closed: 1 April 1857
- Original company: East Lancashire Railway
- Pre-grouping: Lancashire and Yorkshire Railway
- Post-grouping: London Midland and Scottish Railway
Location

Southport London Street was a railway station in Southport, Merseyside.

== History ==
It opened on 9 April 1855 as the East Lancashire Railway's terminus for the Manchester and Southport Railway, a line that it had acquired and jointly operated with the Lancashire and Yorkshire Railway.

The station closed on 1 April 1857, with all services transferred to the adjacent Southport Chapel Street, though the station buildings remained in use as a 'repairing shed' (according to the 1894 Ordnance Survey).

An expansion of Chapel Street in 1914 swallowed the site completely, though its name was preserved with platforms 12 and 13 dubbed the "London Street Excursion Platforms". When Chapel Street was rebuilt in the early 1970s, the excursion platforms were filled in to make space for a car park.

== Bibliography ==
- Gell, Rob (1986). An Illustrated Survey of Railway Stations Between Southport & Liverpool 1848-1986. Heyday Publishing Company. ISBN 0-947562-04-4. (No page numbers.)
- Marshall, John (1969). The Lancashire & Yorkshire Railway. Vol. 1. Newton Abbot: David & Charles. ISBN 978-0-7153-4352-4.
- Quick, Michael (2023) [2001]. Railway passenger stations in Great Britain: a chronology (PDF). version 5.05. Railway & Canal Historical Society.

=== Further reading ===
- Gahan, John W. (1985). Seaport to Seaside. Countywise Limited. pp. 91–93. ISBN 0-907768-07-5., and Avon Anglia Publications, ISBN 0-905466-73-X.

| Preceding station | Disused railways | Following station |
|---|---|---|
| Bescar Lane | East Lancashire Railway; Manchester and Southport Railway | Terminus |
