= John Marshall (railway historian) =

Railway historian

John Marshall (1 May 1922 – 12 November 2008) was an English railway historian. He is best known for his three-volume history of the Lancashire and Yorkshire Railway 'which he greatly disliked being described as "definitive"' and for compiling The Guinness Railway Book 'which, in its six editions, is arguably the best selling railway book of all time.'

== Life ==
Born in Nottingham, John Marshall was conscripted into the Royal Air Force, serving as a wireless mechanic in India. After World War II he trained as a teacher at Loughborough, where he met his wife, Ann, going on to teach woodwork in Bolton. He retired to Bewdley where he worked as a volunteer on the Severn Valley Railway. His sons, Simon and Andrew, and his daughter Jennifer inherited his enthusiasm for railways.

He wrote many articles and books on railway history, his history of the L&YR being published by David & Charles in 1969–72, also travelling very widely in pursuit of his interest, as witnessed by his work on the metre gauge railways of Switzerland and his compendia of international railway facts for Guinness Publishing.

== Selected publications by John Marshall ==
- Marshall, John (2003). A Biographical Dictionary of Railway Engineers (2nd ed.). Oxford: Railway and Canal Historical Society. ISBN 0-901461-22-9.
- —— (1982). The Cromford & High Peak Railway. Newton Abbot: David & Charles. ISBN 0-7153-8128-8.
- —— (1982). Forgotten Railways: North West England. Newton Abbot: David & Charles. ISBN 0-7153-8003-6.
- —— (1971). The Guinness Book of Rail Facts and Feats. Enfield: Guinness Superlatives. ISBN 0-900424-08-7. Preface dated 1972.
- —— (1989). The Guinness Railway Book (2nd ed.). Enfield: Guinness Publishing. ISBN 0-85112-359-7.
- —— (1969). The Lancashire & Yorkshire Railway, vol. 1. Newton Abbot: David & Charles. ISBN 0-7153-4352-1.
- —— (1970). The Lancashire & Yorkshire Railway, vol. 2. Newton Abbot: David & Charles. ISBN 0-7153-4906-6.
- —— (1972). The Lancashire & Yorkshire Railway, vol. 3. Newton Abbot: David & Charles. ISBN 0-7153-5320-9.
- —— (1974). Metre Gauge Railways in South and East Switzerland. Newton Abbot: David & Charles. ISBN 0-7153-6408-1.
- —— (1977). Railway History in Pictures: The Lancashire & Yorkshire Railway. Newton Abbot: David & Charles. ISBN 0-7153-7478-8.
- —— (1989). The Severn Valley Railway. Newton Abbot: David St John Thomas. ISBN 0-946537-45-3.
