= FLI =

FLI may refer to:

- Fli, other name for the Vlie
- Atlantic Airways, a Faroese airline
- Fali of Mubi, a language of Nigeria
- Five Little Indians, an Indian rock band
- Flia, an Albanian dish
- FLIC (file format), an animation storage format
- FLII, a gene
- Flixton railway station in England
- Friedrich Loeffler Institute, a German veterinary research centre
- Future and Freedom (Italian: Futuro e Libertà per l'Italia), Italian political grouping
- Future of Life Institute, a research institute and outreach organization working to mitigate existential risks facing humanity
