= Flis =

Flis may refer to:

- Dmitry Flis (born 1984), Russian basketball player
- Jesse Flis (1933–2026), Canadian politician
- Marcin Flis (born 1994), Polish footballer
- Sylvester Flis (born 1974), American ice sledge hockey player
- Flis (opera)

== See also ==
- FLI (disambiguation)
