= Castlefield corridor =

Rail corridor in Greater Manchester, England

Coordinates: 53.4739°N 2.2468°W

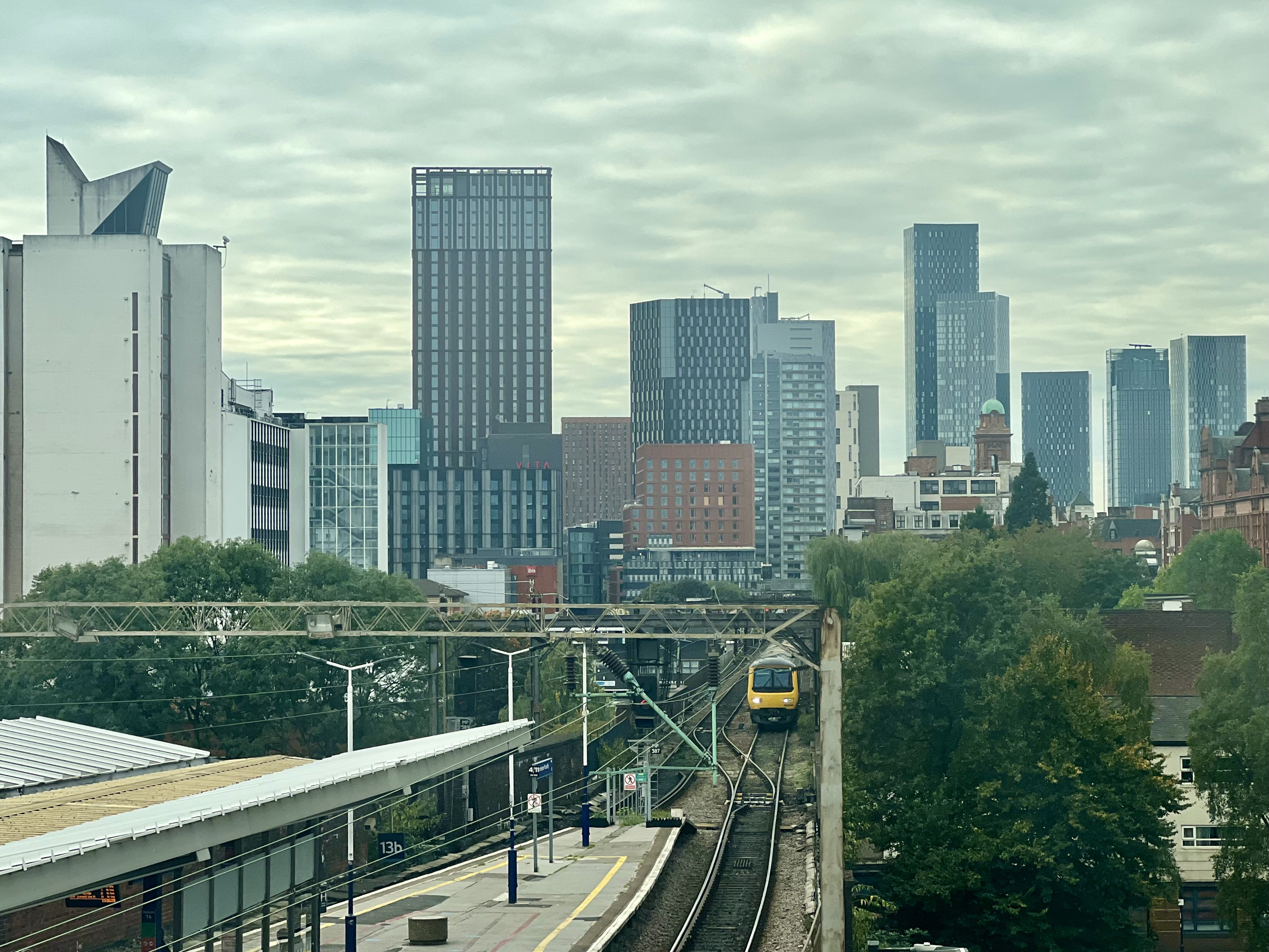
The Castlefield Corridor from Manchester Piccadilly station. 40 million passengers travel through Piccadilly, Oxford Road and Deansgate in Manchester city centre on only one track per-direction.

The Castlefield corridor (also known as the Deansgate corridor) is a railway corridor between Castlefield junction and Fairfield Street junction in Greater Manchester, England. The corridor forms the eastern end of both of the Liverpool–Manchester lines.

The route is recognised as a significant bottleneck, magnified further by the opening of the Ordsall Chord in 2017 and timetable change in May 2018 which increased the number of services through Manchester city centre from 12 to 15 trains per hour. This uplift in services had a detrimental impact on punctuality and reliability, ultimately playing a major factor in the failure of the Arriva Rail North franchise in 2020. As of August 2021, 12 trains per hour pass through the Castlefield corridor.

== Route ==
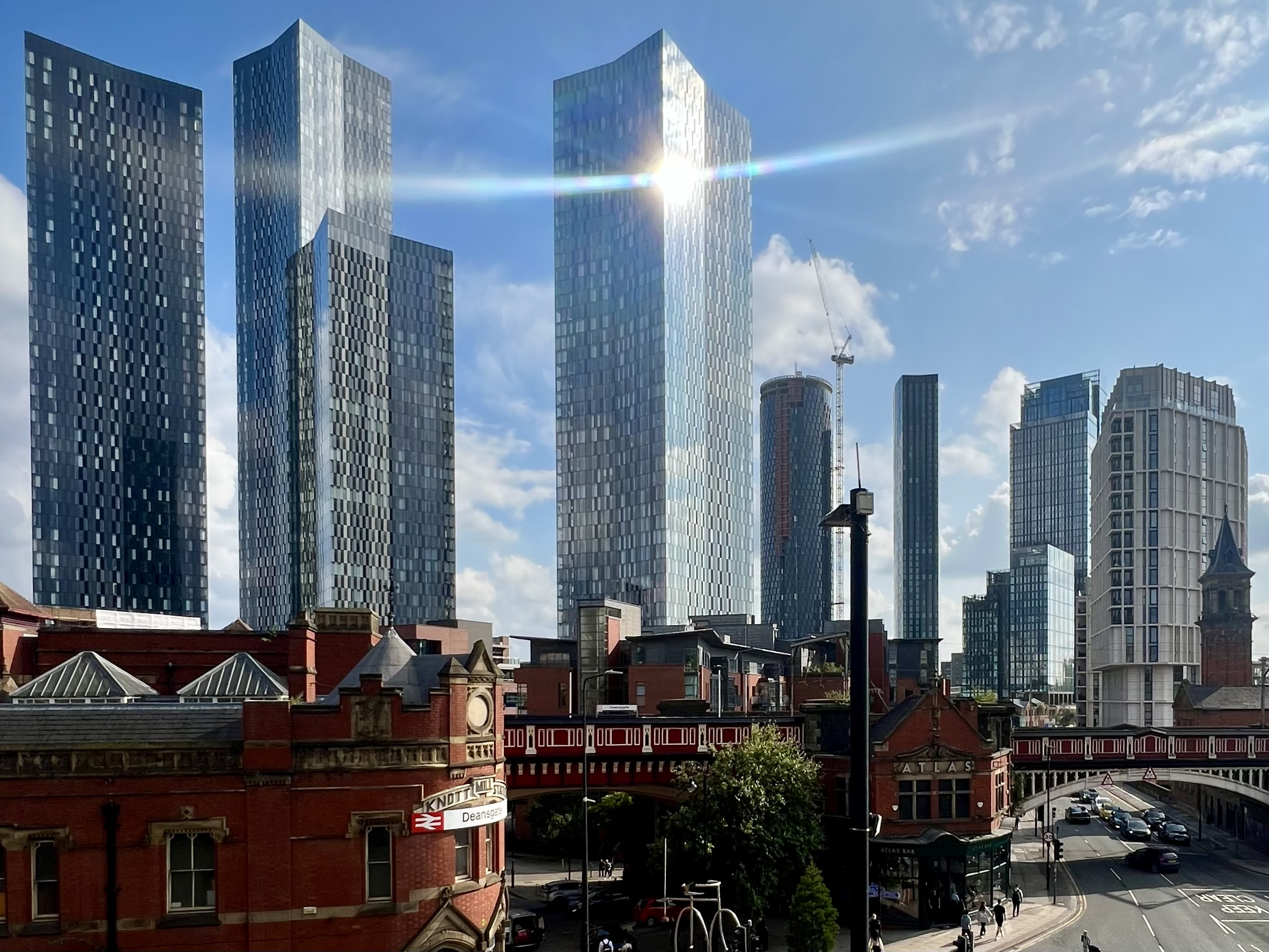
High density residential development around the western end of the Castlefield Corridor in the Deansgate Area. As seen from Deansgate-Castlefield tram stop.

The twin-track corridor extends from Castlefield junction to the west of Deansgate, through Manchester Oxford Road and Manchester Piccadilly, to Fairfield Street junction just beyond Piccadilly station. Oxford Road station is the only point on the route where there are four through lines. At the western end of the corridor, lines from Trafford Park, Eccles, Salford Crescent and Manchester Victoria converge. Lines from Ardwick, Levenshulme and Mauldeth Road converge at the east.

The corridor is on a 1.5-mile-long (2.4 km) viaduct, built by the Manchester, South Junction and Altrincham Railway in the late 1840s as a near continuous series of red brick vaulted arches, interspersed with iron or steel bridges. The structure is Grade II listed from the River Irwell to Piccadilly station.

The route carries a mixture of local and long-distance passenger trains, as well as intermodal freight from the Trafford Park container terminal.

== Current congestion ==
The corridor is a significant bottleneck to rail traffic; it is one of three officially recognised congested infrastructure rail hotspots in the United Kingdom, and is uniquely still in need of major investment. In an attempt to obligate the Department for Transport to provide funding for the Oxford Road upgrade to improve punctuality, Network Rail declared the Castlefield corridor 'congested' in September 2019.

During the COVID-19 pandemic, services on the line were scaled back in line with a 90% reduction in demand, as the United Kingdom went into a lockdown in March 2020. Since the partial return from that lockdown, services were steadily increased. However, the phased recovery process enabled both Northern and TransPennine Express to achieve a higher percentage of reliability and service than in the period immediately before the lockdown. Throughout 2020, there was a limit of 12 trains per hour (12 tph) rather than the previous 15 tph.

== Proposed improvements ==
As a trade-off, a temporary reduction in the number of passenger services using the corridor has been suggested, as a short-term measure to improve service reliability.

In 2010, a study for the Manchester Hub ruled out quad-tracking the corridor with a new viaduct. A rail tunnel has been proposed for the corridor, as part of the Greater Manchester Transport Strategy 2040.

UK rail advocacy group Railfuture has noted that the reinstatement of the Glazebrook East Junction–Skelton Junction line, along with its former branch to Carrington Power Station and an extension of the branch to Flixton, would help to relieve the Castlefield corridor of freight traffic to and from Trafford Park.

A conceptual proposal by un-funded think tank NorthOnTrack was put forward to solve the issue, along with a re-imagining of the integration of Northern Powerhouse Rail, opening up the possibility for the Castlefield Corridor to be freed of long-distance services to become a dedicated S-Bahn-style core for Manchester's commuter services.
