= Irlam railway station =

Railway station in Greater Manchester, England

Irlam
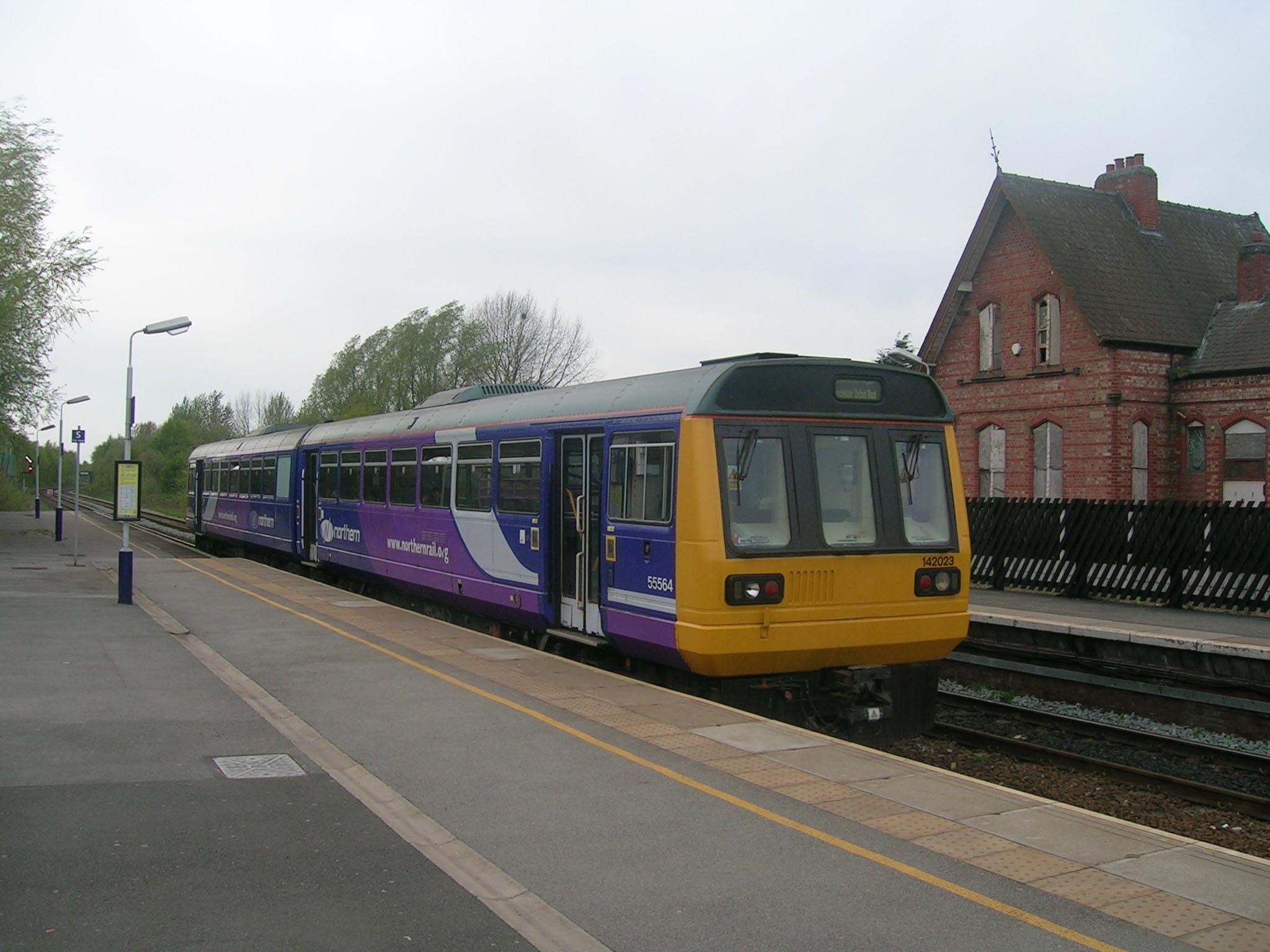
- A Northern Rail Class 142 Pacer on a service to Manchester Oxford Road calls at the station in 2008

General information
- Location: Irlam, Salford; England
- Coordinates: 53.4343°N 2.4341°W
- Grid reference: SJ713931
- Managed by: Northern Trains
- Transit authority: Greater Manchester
- Platforms: 2

Other information
- Station code: IRL
- Classification: DfT category F1

History
- Opened: 1873
- Original company: Cheshire Lines Committee
- Pre-grouping: CLC
- Post-grouping: CLC

Key dates
- 2 September 1873: Original station opened as Irlam
- 1 August 1879: Renamed Irlam and Cadishead
- 26 March 1893: Station resited at higher level
- August 1954: Renamed Irlam for Cadishead
- 6 May 1974: Renamed Irlam

Passengers
- 2020/21: ▼81,978
- 2021/22: ▲0.215 million
- 2022/23: ▲0.230 million
- 2023/24: ▲0.237 million
- 2024/25: ▲0.262 million
Location
Notes
- Passenger statistics from the Office of Rail and Road

Irlam railway station in Irlam, Greater Manchester, England, is 8 3/4 miles (14.1 km) west of Manchester Oxford Road on the Manchester to Liverpool Line, and is operated by Northern Trains.

== History ==
The original station, named Irlam, was opened by the Cheshire Lines Committee on 2 September 1873, on their route between Manchester Central and Liverpool Central. The station was renamed Irlam and Cadishead on 1 August 1879.

The construction of the Manchester Ship Canal, which opened on 1 January 1894, required the railway line to be raised in order to provide clearance for shipping, so a new line was built parallel but at a higher level. The new line was used by goods trains from 9 January 1893, and on 26 March 1893 passenger trains were also transferred to the deviation, the original station being closed and replaced by the present station.

In August 1954, the station was renamed Irlam for Cadishead, reverting to Irlam on 6 May 1974.

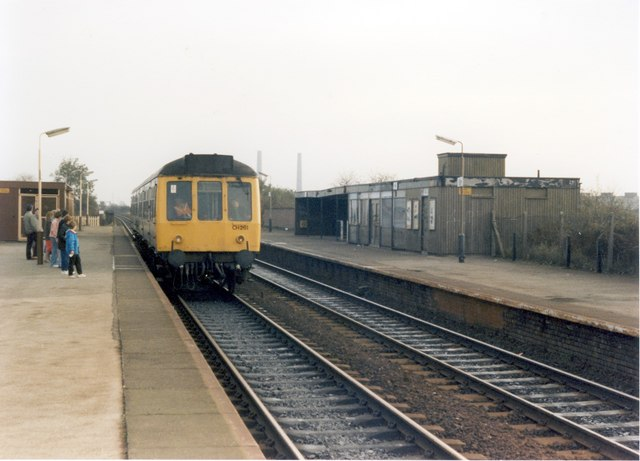
Irlam railway station in 1988

== Facilities ==
The station is unstaffed, despite being used by over 350,000 passengers a year. The next station on the line, Flixton, is at least partially staffed although its usage is much less. A ticket machine is now available for use, both for purchasing tickets and collecting ones bought in advance. Shelters, digital information screens and timetable poster boards are provided on both platforms. Step-free access is available only on the eastbound side.

After lying derelict for nearly twenty-five years, the station building was renovated and reopened in March 2015. It now serves as a railway-themed cafe, with toilets, a cycle hub, and 60-space car park. A 1942 built Peckett & Sons No 2027 0-4-0ST named Irlam belonging to the Friends of Irlam Station together with some wagons is located on a small stretch of line to the north-east of the station's platforms.

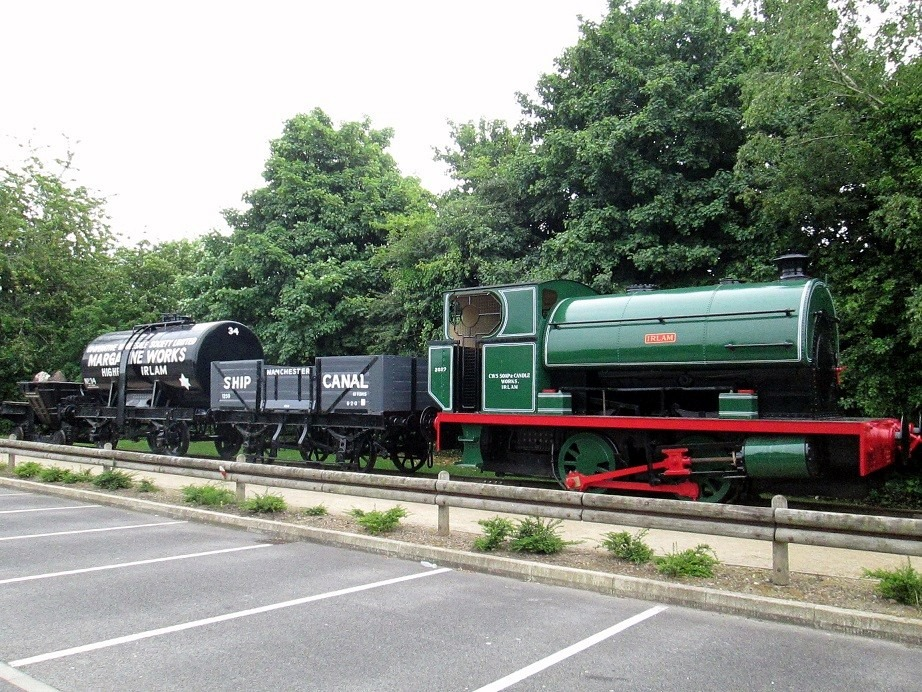
No 2027 Irlam and a few wagons

Irlam station is unusual in that the track and platform is the wrong side of the station building on the Manchester side. This is due to the deviation of the line in 1893.

== Services ==
Monday to Saturday services are provided by Northern Trains and TransPennine Express, both on a basic hourly frequency. Northern local services run to Liverpool Lime Street and Manchester Oxford Road (though a few terminate at Warrington Central at peak times and in the evening), whilst TransPennine Express services run to Liverpool and Cleethorpes via Manchester Piccadilly, Sheffield and Doncaster. The latter service was introduced at the December 2022 timetable change, replacing the former Northern Connect service to/from Manchester Airport.

Trains have served the station on Sundays since December 2006. This is the first Sunday service at this station in over twenty years, with an hourly stopping service operating in both directions to Liverpool and Manchester Oxford Road.

Preceding station	National Rail	Following station
Glazebrook	Northern Trains; Manchester to Liverpool Line	Flixton
Birchwood on Sundays	Northern Trains; Manchester to Liverpool Line	Flixton
Birchwood	TransPennine Express; South Route	Urmston
