= Chassen Road railway station =

Railway station in Greater Manchester, England

Chassen Road
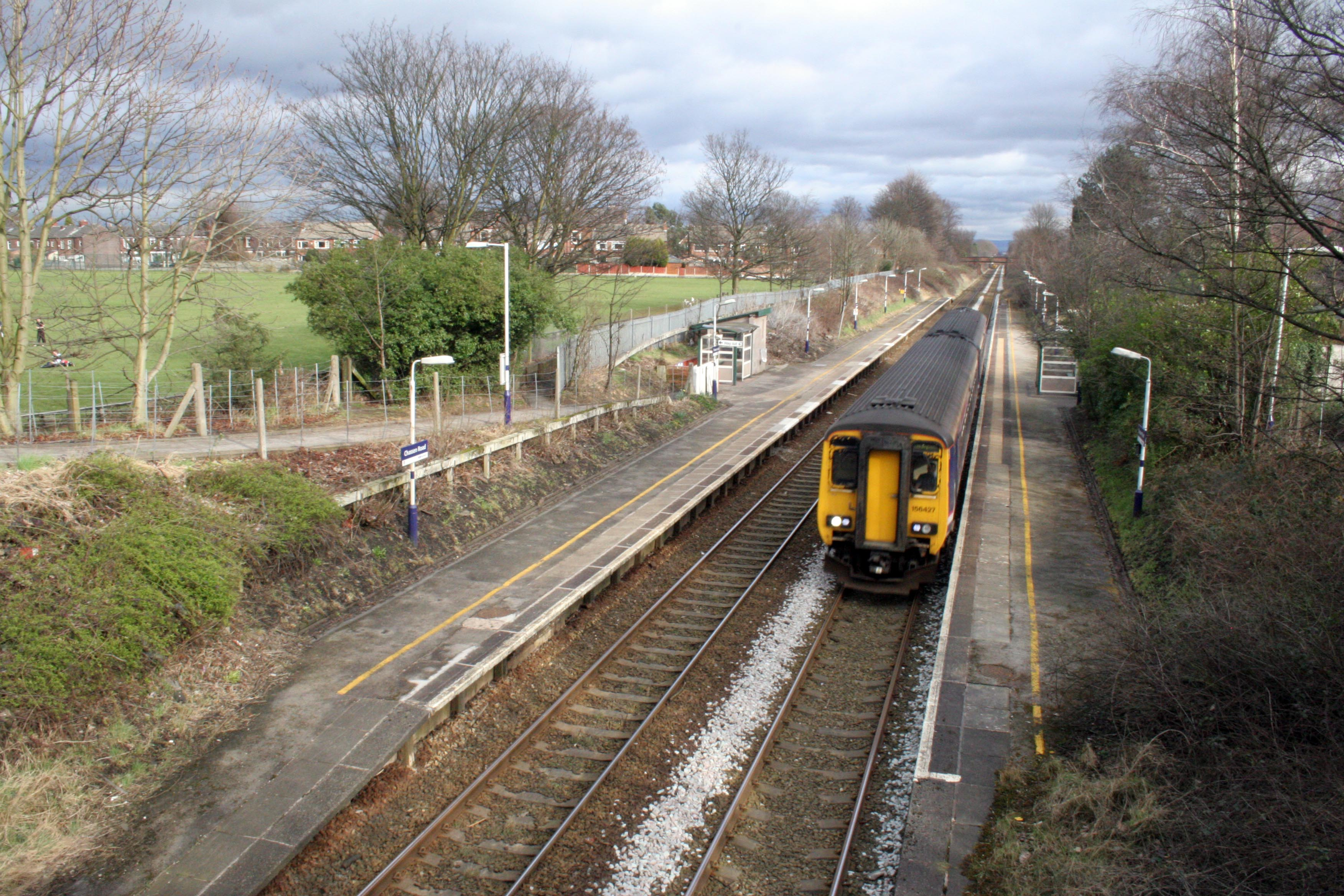

General information
- Location: Urmston, Trafford; England
- Coordinates: 53.4461°N 2.3681°W
- Grid reference: SJ756944
- Manager: Northern Trains
- Platforms: 2

Other information
- Station code: CSR
- Classification: DfT category E

History
- Original company: Cheshire Lines Committee
- Post-grouping: Cheshire Lines Committee

Key dates
- 10 September 1934: Station opened

Passengers
- 2021/22: ▲26,166
- 2022/23: ▲32,830
- 2023/24: ▲34,446
- 2024/25: ▲42,472
- 2025/26: ▲45,438
Location
Notes
- Passenger statistics from the Office of Rail and Road

Chassen Road railway station is in the Trafford metropolitan borough of Greater Manchester in the north west of England. The station was opened by the Cheshire Lines Committee on 10 September 1934. The station, and all services calling there, is operated by Northern Trains. The station is 6.2 miles (10 km) west of Manchester Oxford Road on the southern route of the two Manchester to Liverpool Lines, formerly known as the Cheshire Lines Committee line.

== Facilities ==
The station has a very small ticket office on the Manchester-bound platform which is open on weekday mornings only (06:55 to 10:00). Tickets must be purchased on the train or in advance at all other times.

Each platform has a small covered waiting area and step-free access from the road via ramps. Train running information is provided by timetable posters and telephone.

== Services ==
Services are every two hours in each direction, towards Flixton and Liverpool Lime Street to the west and towards Urmston and Manchester Oxford Road in the east. Extra services call at this station during the peak-hours, however the station is closed on Sundays.

Preceding station	National Rail	Following station
Flixton	Northern Trains; Liverpool to Manchester Line; Mondays-Saturdays only	Urmston
