= Birchwood railway station =

Railway station in Cheshire, England

Birchwood
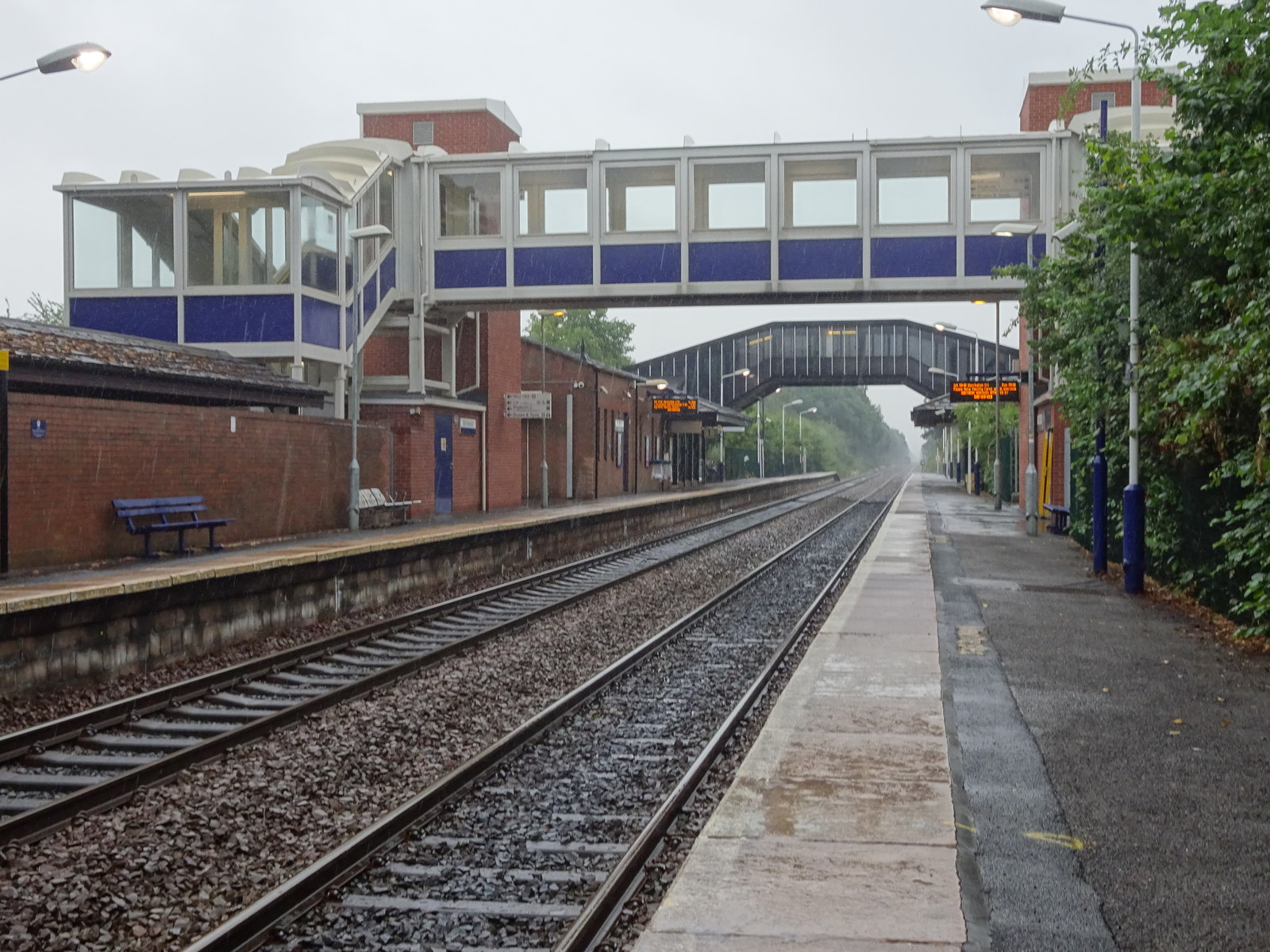
- Birchwood railway station, July 2018

General information
- Location: Birchwood, Warrington; England
- Coordinates: 53.4124°N 2.5253°W
- Grid reference: SJ651908
- Managed by: Northern Trains
- Platforms: 2

Other information
- Station code: BWD
- Classification: DfT category D

History
- Opened: July 1981

Passengers
- 2020/21: ▼0.120 million
- 2021/22: ▲0.330 million
- 2022/23: ▲0.359 million
- 2023/24: ▲0.372 million
- 2024/25: ▲0.437 million
Location
Notes
- Passenger statistics from the Office of Rail and Road

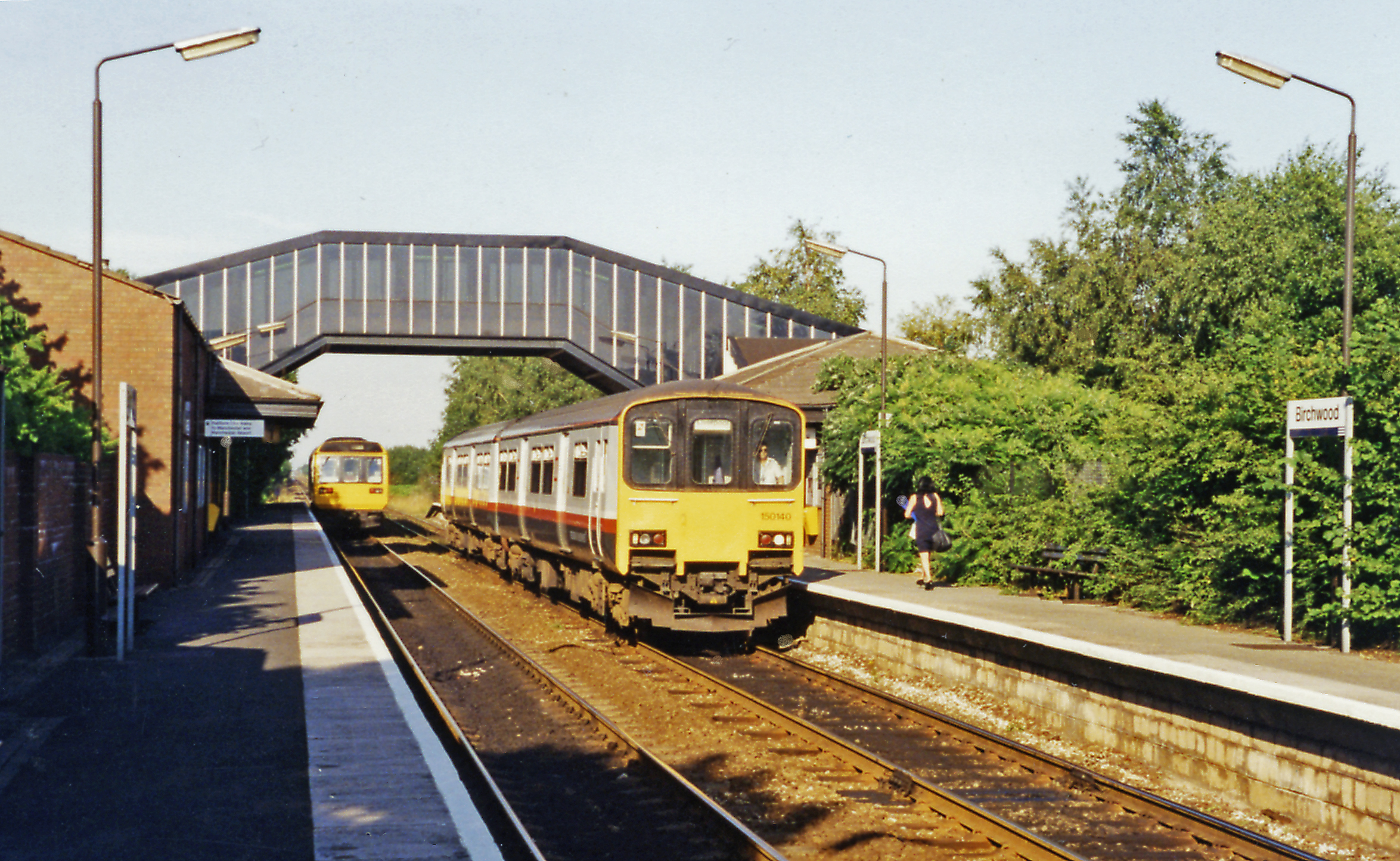
Birchwood station in August 1995

Birchwood railway station is a railway station serving the town of Birchwood, Cheshire, England. The station is 24 1/4 miles (39.0 km) east of Liverpool Lime Street and 13 1/4 miles (21.3 km) west of Manchester Piccadilly on the Liverpool-Manchester line.

The station is operated by Northern Trains and is on the southern route of the Liverpool–Manchester Line. It is staffed full-time (between 06:10 and 23:45 Mondays–Saturdays and 08:25 and 23:20 on Sundays).

== Facilities ==
There is sheltered seating on both platforms, with a ticket office with seating on the Manchester-bound platform. A footbridge connects the two platforms. Outside the station there is a bus stop and the station is close to the Birchwood shopping mall.

The ticket office is open until 22:00, though it does occasionally close during the day whilst staff carry out other duties. During the daytime there are three staff members on the station (station clerk, kiosk and a cleaner), and two of an evening (station clerk and a security guard). When the ticket office is closed there are two ticket machines in the station building on platform 1 and one in the waiting room on platform 2. Train running information is provided by automated announcements, digital information screens and timetable posters. Step-free access is available via lifts on both platforms (commissioned in the autumn of 2014).

== Services ==
The station sees a general frequency of three to four trains per hour in each direction. As of December 2022, services are provided by Northern Trains and TransPennine Express, with limited East Midlands Railway calls at certain points of the day.

=== Northern ===
- One train per hour to Manchester Oxford Road via Irlam (serving most local stations)
- One train per hour to Liverpool Lime Street via Warrington Central (stopping only at some local stations en route)

Most stopping trains originating from Liverpool Lime Street now terminate at Warrington Central.

=== TransPennine Express ===
- One train per hour to Cleethorpes via Manchester Piccadilly, Sheffield and Doncaster.
- One fast train per hour to Liverpool Lime Street, stopping only at Warrington Central and Liverpool South Parkway, with limited calls at Warrington West railway station.

=== East Midlands Railway ===
- Two morning peak trains to Norwich
- One train per day to Liverpool Lime Street

The TPE service replaces the former Northern Connect one to Manchester Airport, which was withdrawn in December 2022 as part of plans to alleviate congestion in the "Castlefield Corridor" section of route through the centre of Manchester. This has also seen the number of Northern local trains to Manchester Oxford Road cut from two per hour to one (though there is still a half-hourly service at peak times).

== History ==
The station was officially opened by British Rail Chairman Sir Peter Parker on 31 July 1981. Constructed at a cost of £750,000, it was the result of cooperation between British Rail, Warrington New Town Development Corporation, Warrington Borough Council and local bus companies. Bus interchange facilities were provided at the station, which served a developing residential and commercial area. The initial service provision was fifty trains per day.

Preceding station	National Rail	Following station
Padgate	Northern Trains Liverpool-Manchester Line	Glazebrook
Warrington Central	East Midlands Railway Liverpool-Norwich Peak Hours only	Manchester Oxford Road
Warrington Central	Northern Trains Liverpool-Manchester Airport	Manchester Oxford Road
Warrington Central	TransPennine Express; South TransPennine	Irlam
Warrington Central	TransPennine Express; South TransPennine	Manchester Oxford Road
