= Urmston railway station =

Railway station in Greater Manchester, England

Urmston
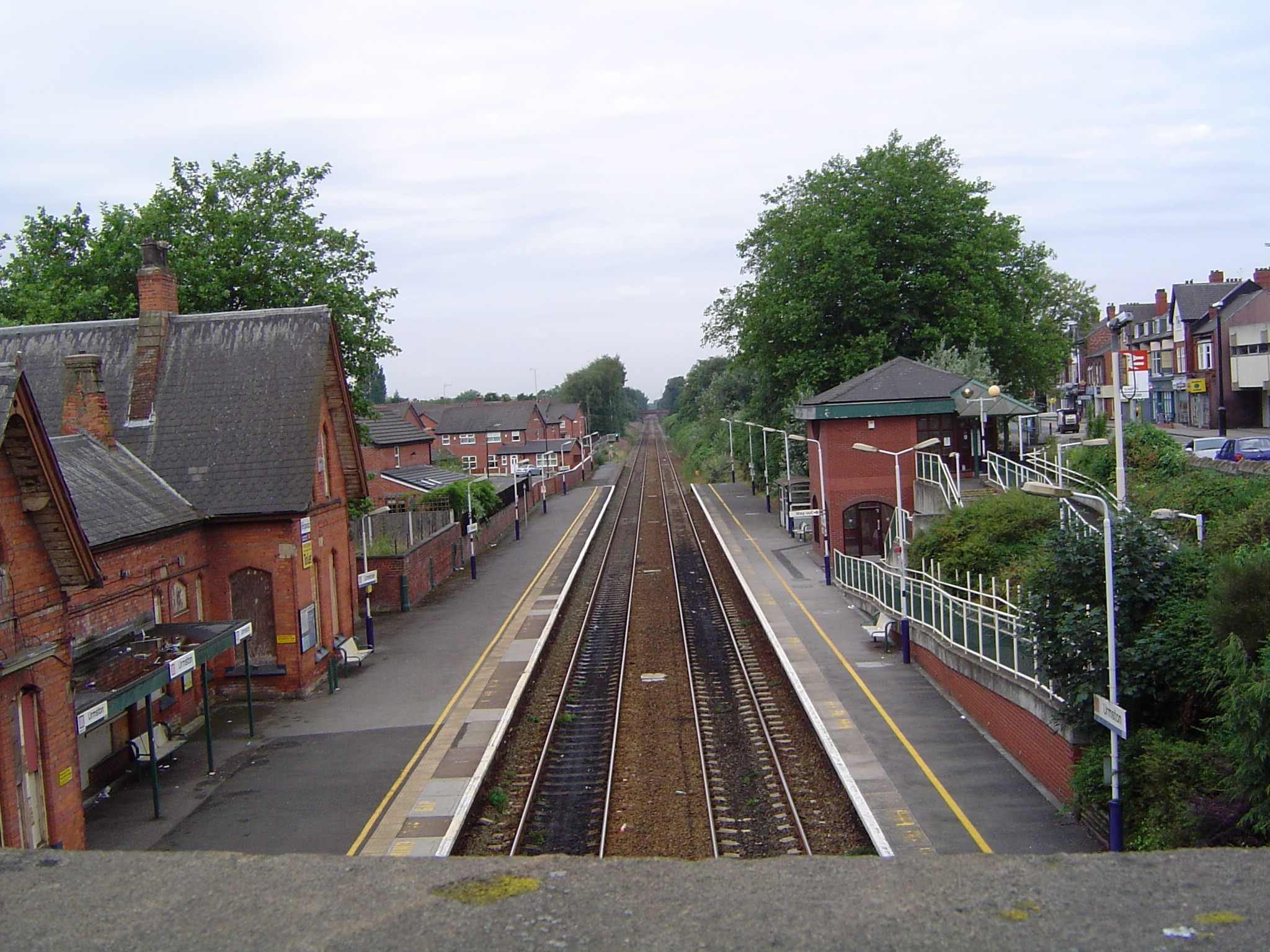
- Urmston Railway Station

General information
- Location: Urmston, Trafford; England
- Coordinates: 53.4483°N 2.3536°W
- Grid reference: SJ766946
- Manager: Northern Trains
- Transit authority: Greater Manchester
- Platforms: 2

Other information
- Station code: URM
- Classification: DfT category E

History
- Original company: Cheshire Lines Committee
- Pre-grouping: Cheshire Lines Committee
- Post-grouping: Cheshire Lines Committee

Key dates
- 2 September 1873: Station opened

Passengers
- 2020/21: ▼81,628
- 2021/22: ▲0.255 million
- 2022/23: ▲0.275 million
- 2023/24: ▲0.292 million
- 2024/25: ▲0.371 million
Location
Notes
- Passenger statistics from the Office of Rail and Road

Urmston railway station is a railway station serving the town of Urmston in Greater Manchester, England. It is 5 1/2 miles (8.9 km) west of Manchester Oxford Road on the Manchester-Liverpool Line. It is managed by Northern Trains.

== History ==
The station was opened by the Cheshire Lines Committee on 2 September 1873.

== Facilities ==
The Victorian ticket office is now The Auld Chimp, a pub/restaurant

A new building on the Manchester-bound platform houses the ticket office and a waiting room. The main station building on the Liverpool-bound platform was disused for many years in the 1990s, but was re-opened as a pub/restaurant in June 2008. The station is staffed part-time (06:15 to 12:45 weekdays, 07:00 to 13:30 Saturdays, closed Sundays) - outside these times, tickets must be bought in advance or on the train. Train running details are provided by telephone, automated announcements and timetable posters. Step-free access is available to both platforms.

== Services ==
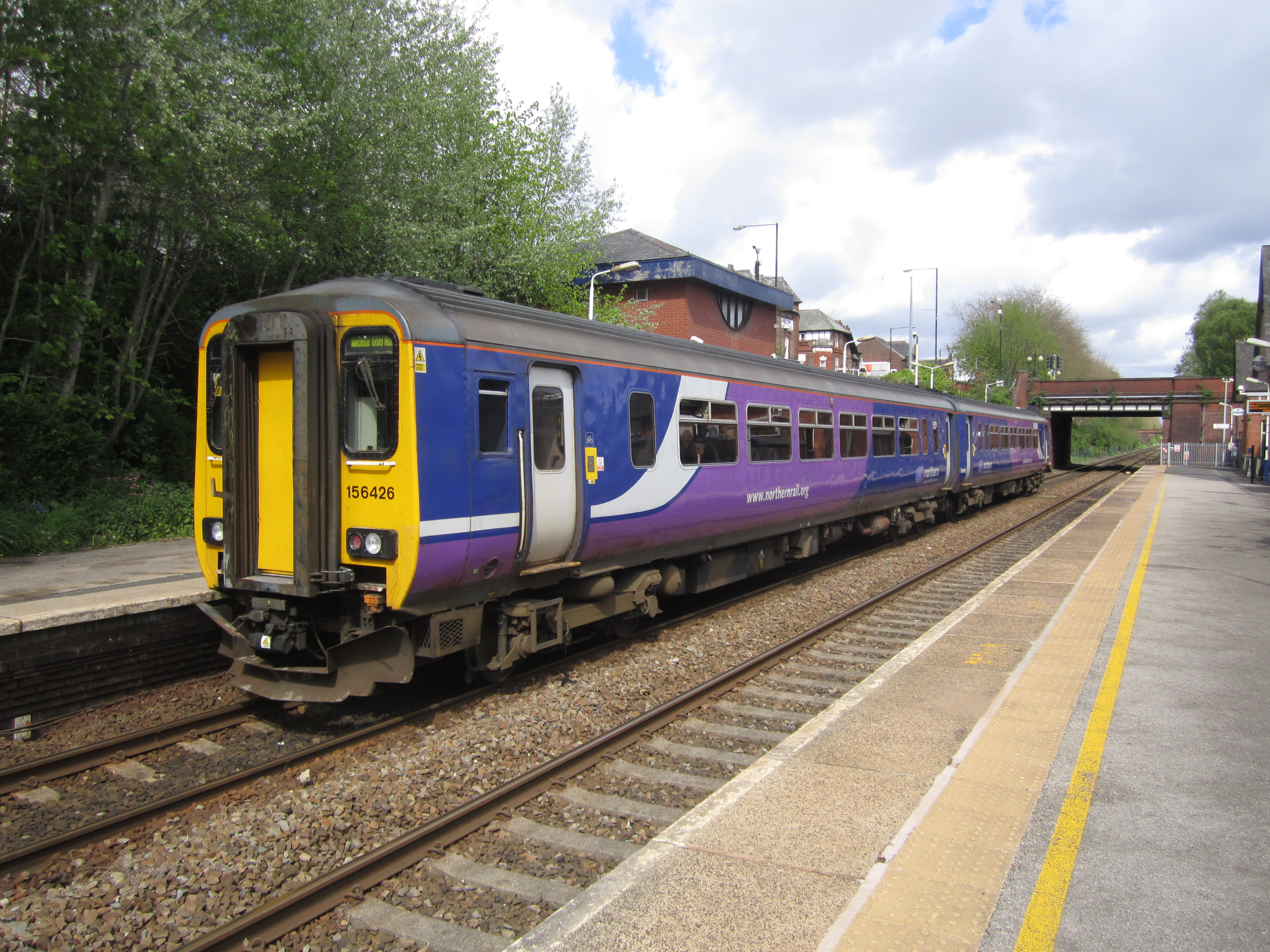
Northern Rail British Rail Class 156 at Urmston, bound for Manchester Oxford Road

Urmston has one local (Northern Trains) and one fast (TransPennine Express) service each hour in each direction on weekdays and Saturdays. The TransPennine Express service runs between Liverpool Lime Street and Cleethorpes and calls at Irlam, Birchwood, Warrington Central and Liverpool South Parkway westbound, whilst running through to Manchester Piccadilly, Stockport, Sheffield and Doncaster eastbound. The stopping service runs between Lime Street and Manchester Oxford Road only, but there are additional trains at peak times (some of which start/terminate at Warrington Central).

Only the Northern local service calls here on Sundays, hourly in each direction.

Preceding station	National Rail	Following station
Chassen Road; Flixton on Sundays	Northern Trains; Manchester to Liverpool Line	Humphrey Park; Deansgate on Sundays
Irlam	TransPennine Express; South TransPennine	Manchester Oxford Road
