= TRAF interacting protein =

Protein-coding gene in the species Homo sapiens

TRAIP

Identifiers
- Aliases: TRAIP, RNF206, TRIP, SCKL9, TRAF interacting protein
- External IDs: OMIM: 605958; MGI: 1096377; GeneCards: TRAIP
Available structures
PDB	Ortholog search: PDBe RCSB
PDB	List of PDB id codes 4ZTD
Enzyme activity
EC #	BRENDA	ExPASy	KEGG	MetaCyc
2.3.2.27	↗	↗	↗	↗

Gene location (Human)
Chr.	Chromosome 3 (human)
Band	3p21.31	Start	49,828,601 bp
Band	3p21.31	End	49,856,574 bp

Gene location (Mouse)
Chr.	Chromosome 9 (mouse)
Band	9 F1|9 59.07 cM	Start	107,827,335 bp
Band	9 F1|9 59.07 cM	End	107,849,469 bp
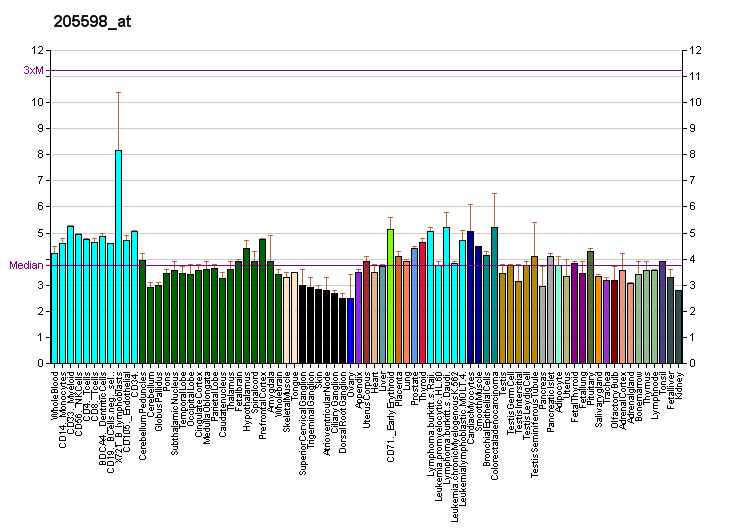
RNA expression pattern
Bgee	Human / Mouse (ortholog); Top expressed in: testicle; gonad; ventricular zone; ganglionic eminence; mucosa of transverse colon; left testis; right testis; stromal cell of endometrium; rectum; nucleus accumbens / Top expressed in: tail of embryo; gastrula; genital tubercle; fetal liver hematopoietic progenitor cell; morula; morula; otic placode; zygote; yolk sac; embryo; More reference expression data
BioGPS	More reference expression data
Gene ontology
Molecular function	ubiquitin-protein transferase activity; protein binding; metal ion binding; ubiquitin protein ligase activity; transferase activity; zinc ion binding
Cellular component	cytoplasm; perinuclear region of cytoplasm; nucleolus; nucleus
Biological process	cell population proliferation; protein ubiquitination; negative regulation of interferon-beta production; signal transduction; negative regulation of tumor necrosis factor-mediated signaling pathway; apoptotic process; negative regulation of NF-kappaB transcription factor activity
Sources:Amigo / QuickGO
Orthologs
Databases	NCBI: entry; OMA: entry
Species	Human	Mouse
Entrez	10293	22036
Ensembl	ENSG00000183763	ENSMUSG00000032586
UniProt	Q9BWF2	Q8VIG6
RefSeq (mRNA)	NM_005879	NM_011634
RefSeq (protein)	NP_005870	NP_035764
Location (UCSC)	Chr 3: 49.83 – 49.86 Mb	Chr 9: 107.83 – 107.85 Mb
PubMed search
- Wikidata
View/Edit Human	View/Edit Mouse

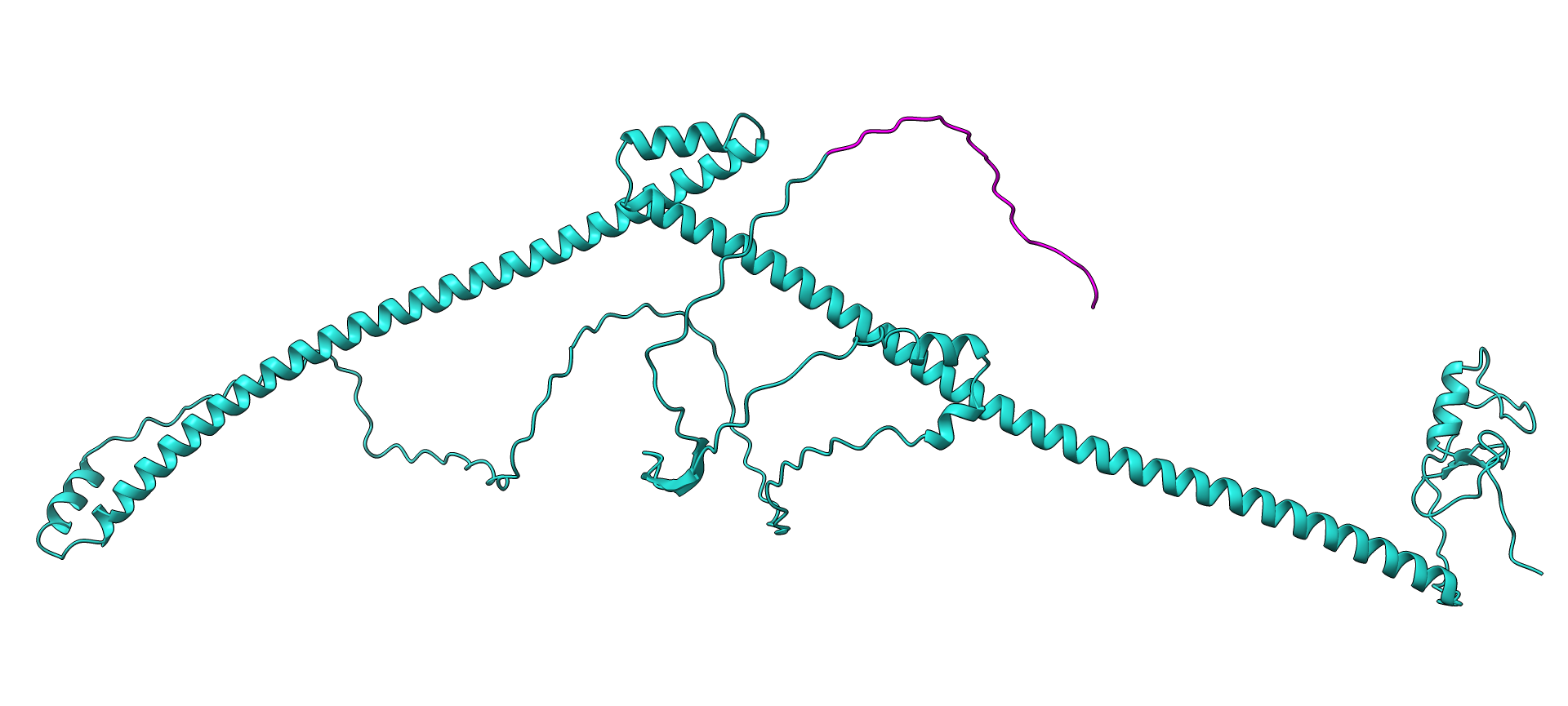
The AlphaFold predicted structure of the TRAIP protein Q9BWF2. The highlighted region has been found to bind to the PCNA PIP box. This image was generated using ChimeraX version 1.7.1.

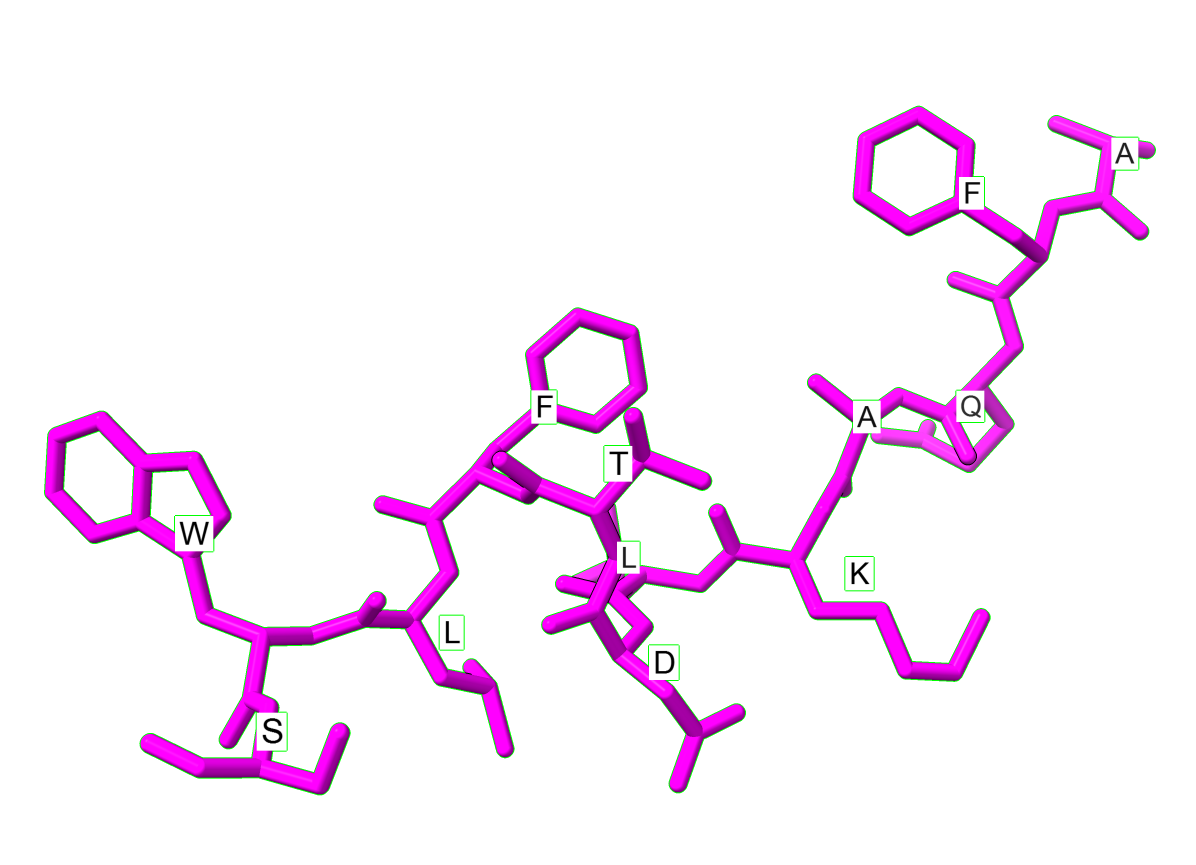
Detailed view of residue sequence 447-469 of the TRAIP protein in its binding conformation with the PCNA PIP box. This This image was generated using ChimeraX version 1.7.1.

TRAF-interacting protein is a protein that in humans is encoded by the TRAIP gene.

This gene encodes a protein that contains an N-terminal RING finger motif and a putative coiled-coil domain. A similar murine protein interacts with TNFR-associated factor 1 (TRAF1), TNFR-associated factor 2 (TRAF2), and cylindromatosis. The interaction with TRAF2 inhibits TRAF2-mediated nuclear factor kappa-B, subunit 1 activation that is required for cell activation and protection against apoptosis.

== Interactions ==
TRAF interacting protein has been shown to interact with FLII, TRAF1 and TRAF2.

== Role in mitotic DNA synthesis ==
Mitotic DNA synthesis (MiDAS) is thought to be a DNA repair mechanism to salvage DNA that has not finished replication during S phase, which may be due to DNA replication stress (RS). Intrinsic sources of RS include transcription-replication conflicts and “difficult-to-replicate’’ regions. Extrinsic RS includes exposure to genotoxic agents, depletion of dNTPs, and premature S phase activity which can occur in precancerous cells after oncogene activation. Some MiDAS pathways require the TRAIP protein to disassemble the replication complex at the stalled replication fork in cases where RS causes the fork to stall during replication.
