= LRRFIP1 =

Protein-coding gene in the species Homo sapiens

Identifiers
- Aliases: LRRFIP1, FLAP-1, FLAP1, FLIIAP1, GCF-2, GCF2, HUFI-1, TRIP, leucine rich repeat (in FLII) interacting protein 1, LRR binding FLII interacting protein 1
- External IDs: OMIM: 603256; MGI: 1342770; GeneCards: LRRFIP1
Available structures
PDB	Ortholog search: PDBe RCSB
PDB	List of PDB id codes 4H22

Gene location (Human)
Chr.	Chromosome 2 (human)
Band	2q37.3	Start	237,627,587 bp
Band	2q37.3	End	237,813,682 bp

Gene location (Mouse)
Chr.	Chromosome 1 (mouse)
Band	1|1 D	Start	90,998,737 bp
Band	1|1 D	End	91,128,944 bp
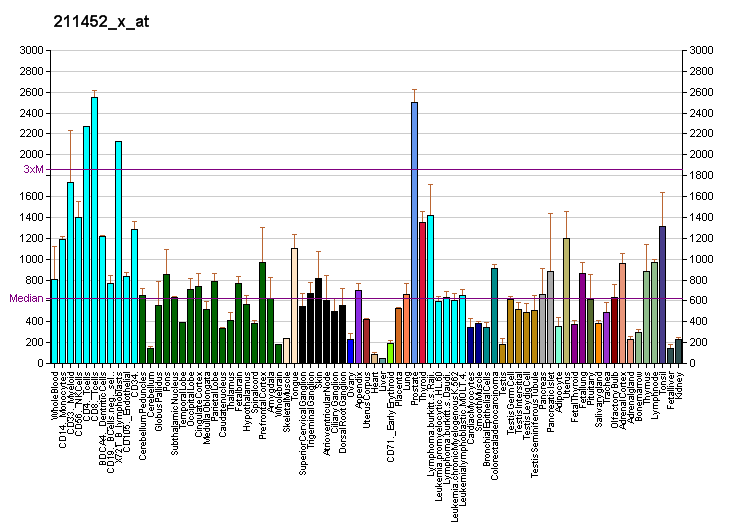

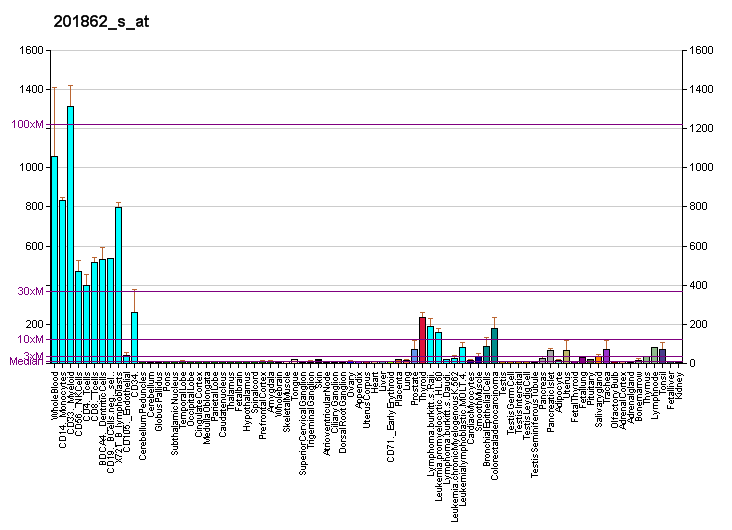

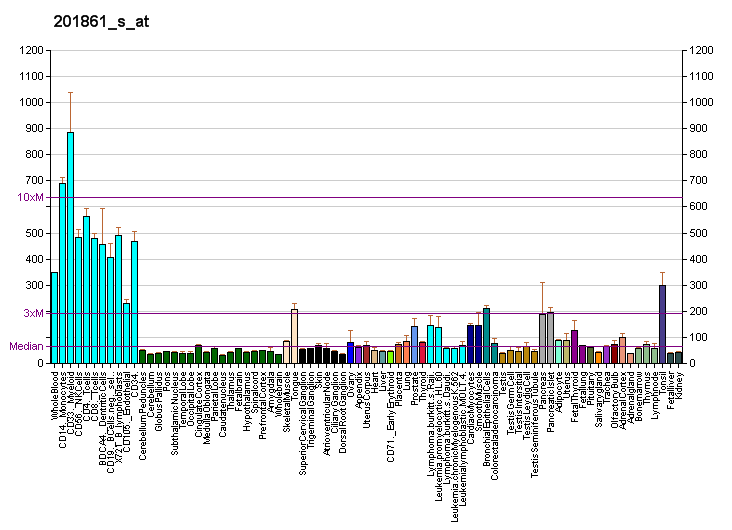
RNA expression pattern
Bgee	Human / Mouse (ortholog); Top expressed in: renal medulla; endothelial cell; cardia; nipple; pylorus; visceral pleura; superior surface of tongue; buccal mucosa cell; mucosa of pharynx; pericardium / Top expressed in: secondary oocyte; zygote; endothelial cell of lymphatic vessel; conjunctival fornix; granulocyte; primary oocyte; urothelium; hair follicle; transitional epithelium of urinary bladder; lacrimal gland; More reference expression data
BioGPS	More reference expression data
Gene ontology
Molecular function	DNA binding; double-stranded RNA binding; protein binding; protein homodimerization activity; cadherin binding; RNA polymerase II cis-regulatory region sequence-specific DNA binding; DNA-binding transcription repressor activity, RNA polymerase II-specific; DNA-binding transcription factor activity, RNA polymerase II-specific
Cellular component	plasma membrane; cytoskeleton; nucleus; cytoplasm; cytosol
Biological process	regulation of transcription by RNA polymerase II; negative regulation of transcription, DNA-templated; regulation of transcription, DNA-templated; positive regulation of type I interferon production; transcription, DNA-templated; negative regulation of transcription by RNA polymerase II; positive regulation of NF-kappaB transcription factor activity
Sources:Amigo / QuickGO
Orthologs
Databases	NCBI: entry; OMA: entry
Species	Human	Mouse
Entrez	9208	16978
Ensembl	ENSG00000124831	ENSMUSG00000026305
UniProt	Q32MZ4	Q3UZ39
RefSeq (mRNA)	NM_001137550; NM_001137551; NM_001137552; NM_001137553; NM_004735	NM_001111311; NM_001111312; NM_008515; NM_001310732
RefSeq (protein)	NP_001131022; NP_001131023; NP_001131024; NP_001131025; NP_004726	NP_001104781; NP_001104782; NP_001297661; NP_032541
Location (UCSC)	Chr 2: 237.63 – 237.81 Mb	Chr 1: 91 – 91.13 Mb
PubMed search
- Wikidata
View/Edit Human	View/Edit Mouse

Leucine-rich repeat flightless-interacting protein 1 is a protein that in humans is encoded by the LRRFIP1 gene.

== Interactions ==
LRRFIP1 has been shown to interact with FLII.
