= FLII =

Protein-coding gene in the species Homo sapiens

Identifiers
- Aliases: FLII, FLI, FLIL, Fli1, actin remodeling protein, FLII actin remodeling protein
- External IDs: OMIM: 600362; MGI: 1342286; GeneCards: FLII

Gene location (Human)
Chr.	Chromosome 17 (human)
Band	17p11.2	Start	18,244,815 bp
Band	17p11.2	End	18,258,738 bp

Gene location (Mouse)
Chr.	Chromosome 11 (mouse)
Band	11 B2|11 37.81 cM	Start	60,604,949 bp
Band	11 B2|11 37.81 cM	End	60,618,089 bp
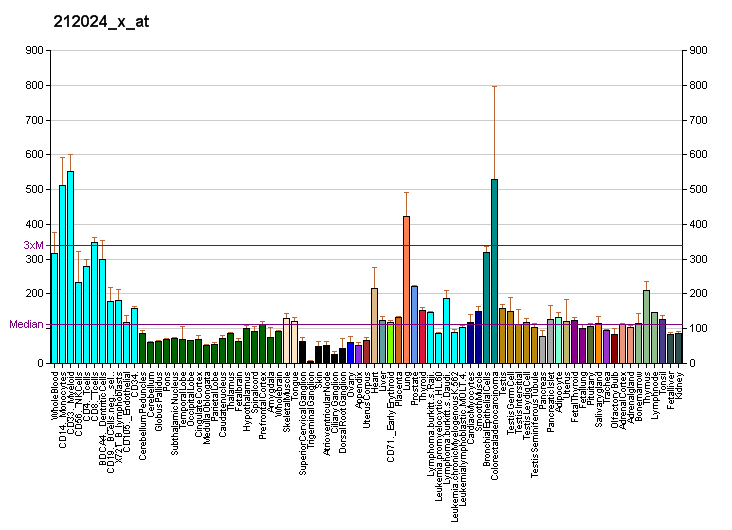

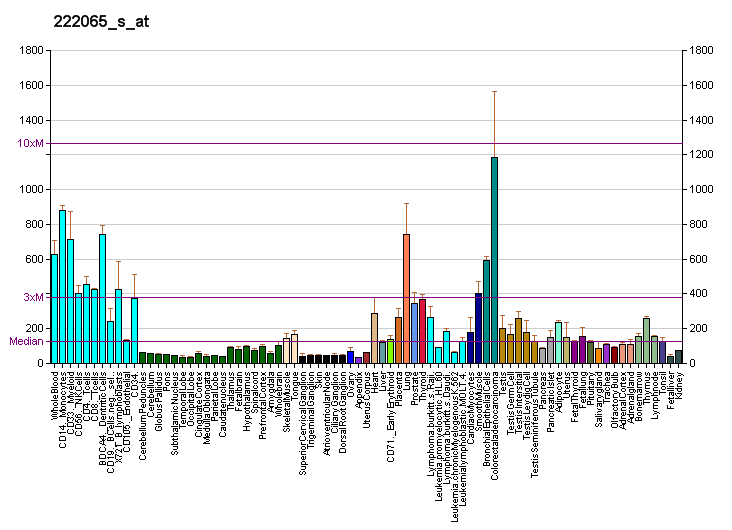

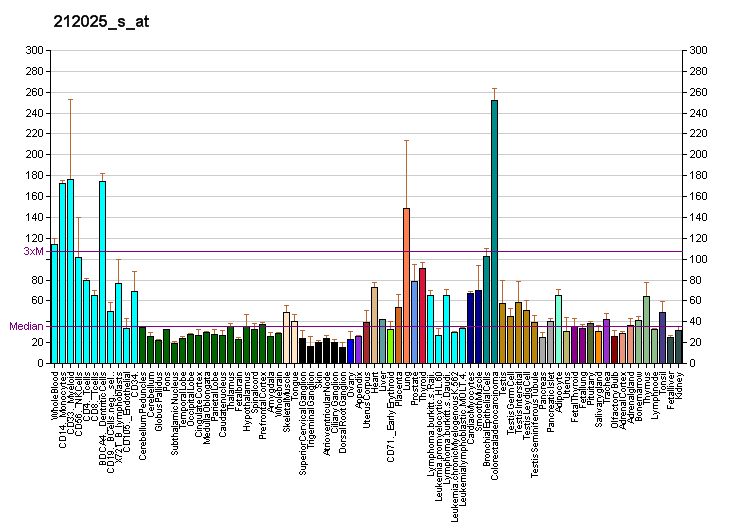
RNA expression pattern
Bgee	Human / Mouse (ortholog); Top expressed in: apex of heart; muscle of thigh; gastrocnemius muscle; skeletal muscle tissue; spleen; mucosa of transverse colon; pituitary gland; anterior pituitary; minor salivary glands; right lobe of thyroid gland / Top expressed in: Ileal epithelium; choroid plexus of fourth ventricle; granulocyte; cardiac muscle tissue of left ventricle; lactiferous gland; tracheobronchial tree; internal carotid artery; mesenteric lymph nodes; right lung lobe; muscle of thigh; More reference expression data
BioGPS	More reference expression data
Gene ontology
Molecular function	actin binding; protein binding; actin filament binding
Cellular component	cell junction; cytoskeleton; brush border; nucleus; focal adhesion; nucleoplasm; microtubule organizing center; cytoplasm; cytosol
Biological process	multicellular organism development; actin filament severing; regulation of transcription, DNA-templated; actin cytoskeleton organization; transcription, DNA-templated
Sources:Amigo / QuickGO
Orthologs
Databases	NCBI: entry; OMA: entry
Species	Human	Mouse
Entrez	2314	14248
Ensembl	ENSG00000177731; ENSG00000284571	ENSMUSG00000002812
UniProt	Q13045	Q9JJ28
RefSeq (mRNA)	NM_001256264; NM_001256265; NM_002018	NM_022009; NM_001302207
RefSeq (protein)	NP_001243193; NP_001243194; NP_002009	NP_001289136; NP_071292
Location (UCSC)	Chr 17: 18.24 – 18.26 Mb	Chr 11: 60.6 – 60.62 Mb
PubMed search
- Wikidata
View/Edit Human	View/Edit Mouse

Protein flightless-1 homolog is a protein that in humans is encoded by the FLII gene.

This gene encodes a protein with a gelsolin-like actin binding domain and an N-terminal leucine-rich repeat-protein protein interaction domain. The protein is similar to a Drosophila protein involved in early embryogenesis and the structural organization of indirect flight muscle. The gene is located within the Smith-Magenis syndrome region on chromosome 17.

== Interactions ==
FLII has been shown to interact with LRRFIP1 and TRAF interacting protein.
