= Flixton railway station =

Railway station in Greater Manchester, England

Flixton
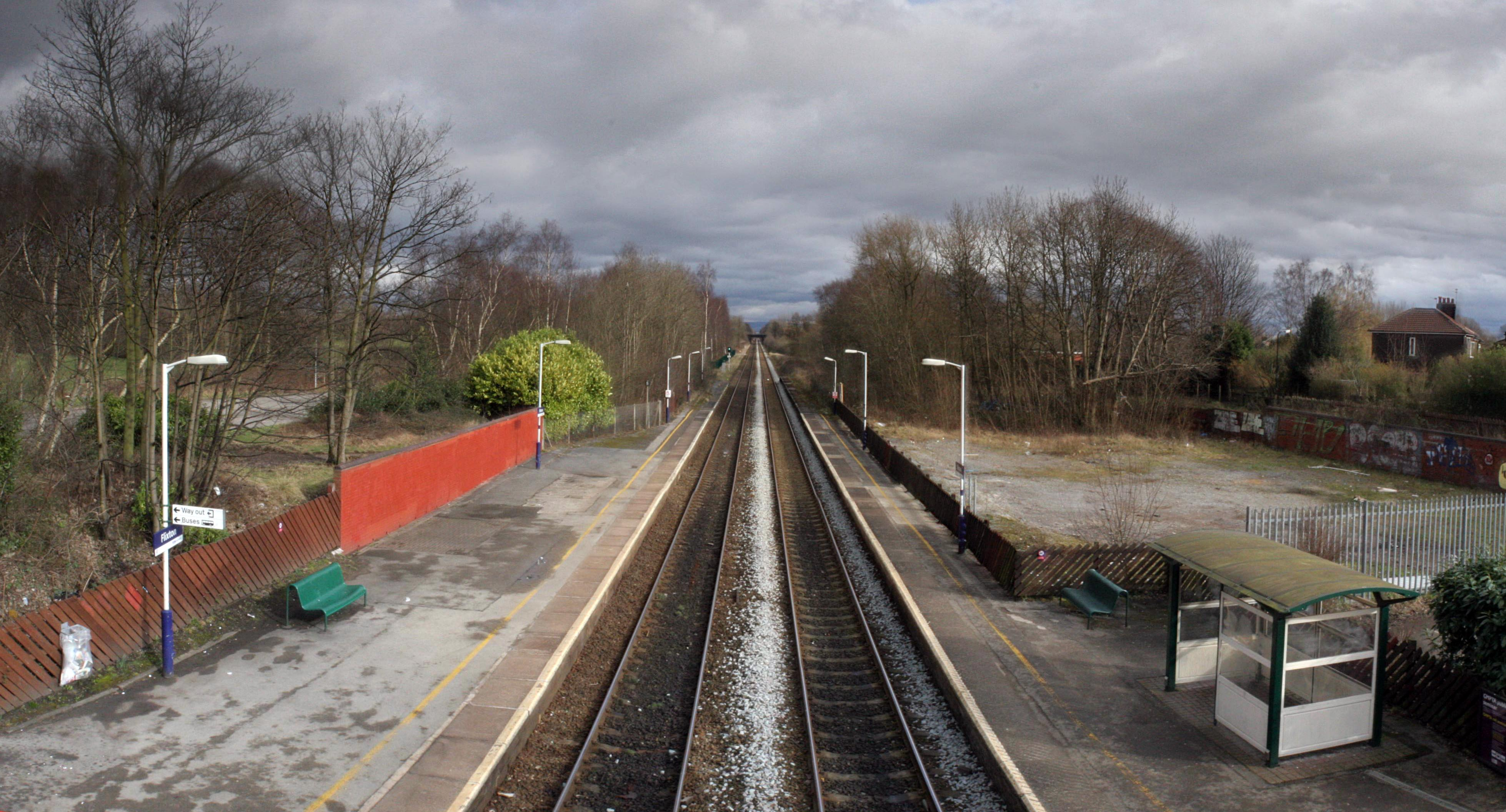

General information
- Location: Flixton, Trafford; England
- Coordinates: 53.4439°N 2.3833°W
- Grid reference: SJ746941
- Managed by: Northern Trains
- Platforms: 2

Other information
- Station code: FLI
- Classification: DfT category E

History
- Original company: Cheshire Lines Committee
- Pre-grouping: Cheshire Lines Committee
- Post-grouping: Cheshire Lines Committee

Key dates
- 1 October 1873: Station opened

Passengers
- 2020/21: ▼25,754
- 2021/22: ▲75,970
- 2022/23: ▲90,120
- 2023/24: ▲0.102 million
- 2024/25: ▲0.119 million
Location
Notes
- Passenger statistics from the Office of Rail and Road

Flixton railway station is in Flixton, Greater Manchester, in the North West of England. The station, and all services calling there, are operated by Northern Trains. It is 6 1/2 miles (10.5 km) west of Manchester Oxford Road on the Manchester to Liverpool Line.

== History ==
The station once had a small goods yard on the northern side of the main line, the bay platform for which still exists although it is no longer in use. The goods yard itself is now a car park. All the track relating to the goods yard has been removed.

In the 1990s, the station building was converted into a Henry's Table pub and restaurant and then into a nightclub and bar called Brunel's. It was destroyed by fire in 1998 and was demolished in 2001.

== Facilities ==
The ticket office on Flixton Road bridge, a portable building installed to replace the demolished station building, is staffed Monday-Friday between 06:20-12:50. At other times, tickets are purchased from the conductor on the train or from a machine on the Manchester bound platform.

The original footbridge remains and is still in use. A small "bus stop" style shelter on the down platform also survives from the original station building. Train running information is provide by timetable posters and information boards. Step-free access is available to both platforms.

== Services ==
Services are roughly hourly in each direction seven days per week, towards Irlam and Liverpool Lime Street to the west, and towards Urmston and Manchester Oxford Road to the east. Extra services call at the station during peak-hours, when some services terminate at Warrington Central.

Preceding station	National Rail	Following station
Irlam	Northern Trains; Liverpool–Manchester lines Southern Route (Cheshire Lines)	Chassen Road
