= Manchester Oxford Road railway station =

Railway station in Manchester, England

Manchester Oxford Road
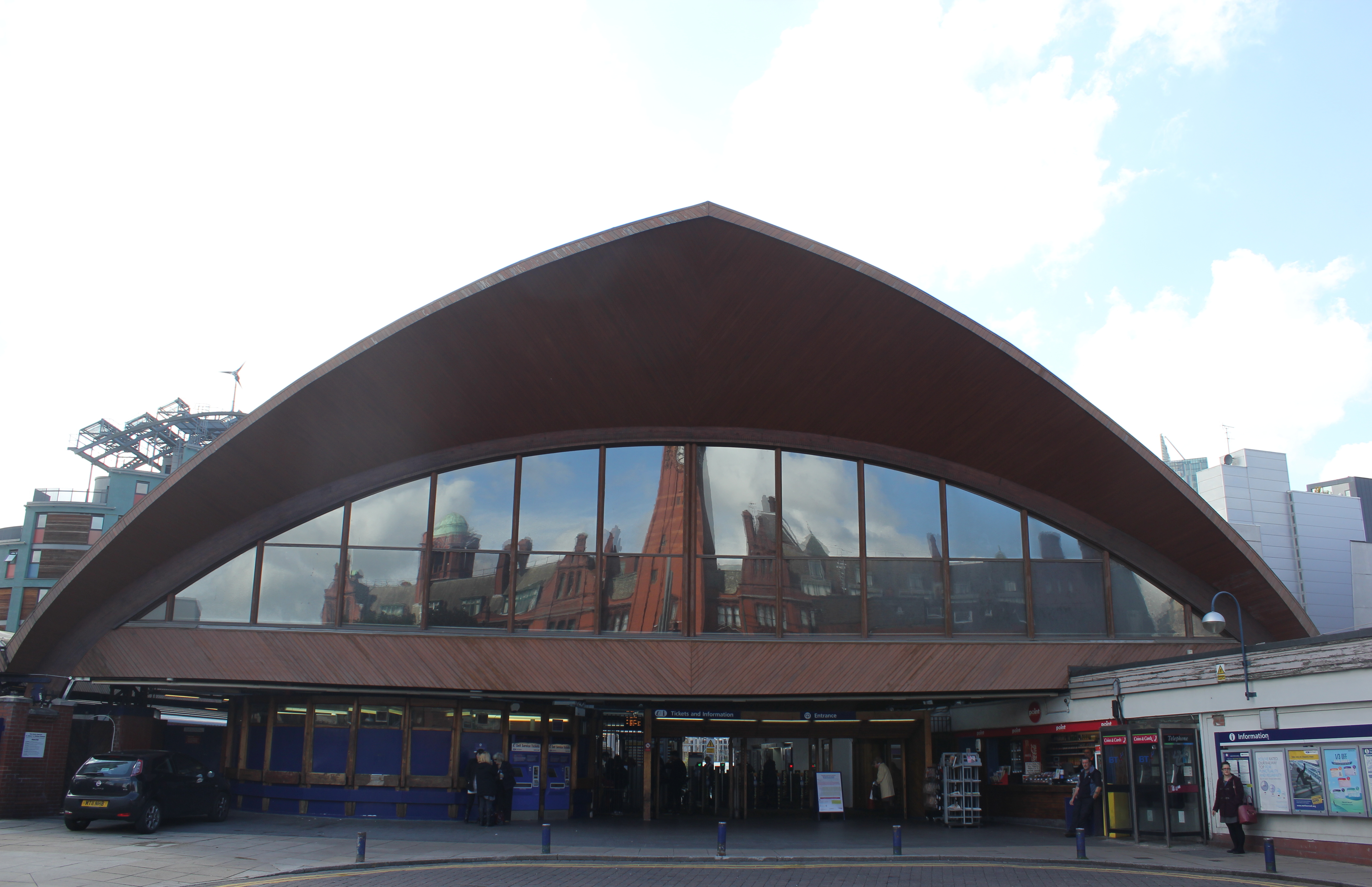
- The Grade-II listed timber facade of the station

General information
- Location: Manchester city centre, City of Manchester; England
- Coordinates: 53.4739°N 2.2422°W
- Grid reference: SJ840974
- Manager: Northern Trains
- Transit authority: Greater Manchester
- Platforms: 5

Other information
- Station code: MCO
- Classification: DfT category C1

History
- Original company: Manchester, South Junction and Altrincham Railway
- Pre-grouping: Manchester, South Junction and Altrincham Railway
- Post-grouping: Manchester, South Junction and Altrincham Railway

Key dates
- 20 July 1849: Opened
- 12 September 1960: Rebuilt and reopened

Passengers
- 2021/22: ▲3.872 million
- Interchange: ▲0.684 million
- 2022/23: ▲4.658 million
- Interchange: ▲0.816 million
- 2023/24: ▲5.096 million
- Interchange: ▲0.899 million
- 2024/25: ▲6.393 million
- Interchange: ▲0.958 million
- 2025/26: ▲7.135 million
- Interchange: ▲0.977 million

Listed Building – Grade II
- Feature: Manchester Oxford Road station (including platform structures)
- Designated: 24 November 1995
- Reference no.: 1255053
Location
Notes
- Passenger statistics from the Office of Rail and Road

Manchester Oxford Road is a railway station in Manchester, England, at the junction of Whitworth Street West and Oxford Street. It opened in 1849 and was rebuilt in 1960. It is the third busiest of the four stations in Manchester city centre.

The station serves the southern part of Manchester city centre, the University of Manchester and Manchester Metropolitan University, on the line from Manchester Piccadilly westwards towards Warrington Central, Chester, Llandudno, Liverpool, Preston and Blackpool North. Eastbound trains continue beyond Piccadilly to Crewe, Leeds, Sheffield, Nottingham, Peterborough and Norwich. The station consists of four through platforms and one terminating bay platform.

The station lies on a Grade II listed viaduct, which was built in 1839 as part of the Manchester, South Junction and Altrincham Railway. To reduce load on this viaduct, the station unusually utilises laminated wood structures as opposed to masonry, concrete, iron or steel. English Heritage describes it as a "building of outstanding architectural quality and technological interest; one of the most dramatic stations in England." It was Grade II listed in 1995. Architectural critic Nikolaus Pevsner described the station as "one of the most remarkable and unusual stations in the country".

It has long been envisaged, since the Manchester Hub plan in 2009, that the station will be upgraded; in October 2016, a Transport and Works Act 1992 application was submitted to extend platforms at the station as part of the wider Manchester Piccadilly and Manchester Oxford Road Capacity Scheme. As of 2019, this application remains active but has not been approved by government. As a key transition node for both north–south and east–west transpennine routes, it is a recognised bottleneck and is the most delayed major station in the United Kingdom according to a Which? study in 2018 with over three quarters of services failing to depart on time during peak hours. In an attempt to obligate the DfT to provide funding for the Oxford Road upgrade to improve punctuality, Network Rail declared the Castlefield Corridor "congested" in September 2019.

== History ==
The station opened as Oxford Road on 20 July 1849 and was the headquarters of the Manchester, South Junction and Altrincham Railway (MSJAR) until 1904. The station was built on the site of 'Little Ireland', a slum "of a worse character than St Giles", in which about four thousand people had lived in "measureless filth and stench" (according to Friedrich Engels in The Condition of the Working Class in England) and of a gasworks which was relocated to the west. The station buildings, which were temporary wooden structures, were accessed by an inclined esplanade winding to the right from Gloucester Street (now Whitworth Street West) to reach their north front.

There was a single platform on the north side of the line through to Manchester London Road and a second platform on a west-facing siding. To allow for extra trains in connection with the Manchester Art Treasures Exhibition in 1857, extra platforms and sidings were built, but removed afterwards. A meeting of MSJAR contract ticket holders in 1863 included in its list of complaints the want of punctuality "especially as at Oxford Road station there is only one platform used for both passengers and milk".

From 1854 onwards, Oxford Road served as the terminus for a service to Liverpool, independent of the London and North Western Railway(LNWR) (one of the joint owners of MSJAR). The rail service went no further than Garston, with the final leg of the journey being made by steamer, but it alerted the LNWR to the possible use of the MSJAR by its co-owner, the Manchester, Sheffield and Lincolnshire Railway (MS&LR) to reach areas west of Manchester. Consequently, in 1857, when the MSJAR began (the decision being taken on the casting vote of the board's chairman, by rotation) running an Oxford Road – London Road service, the LNWR took strenuous measures to discourage it. Every train of the service was flagged down just short of the London Road platform and not allowed to proceed further, passengers being told they were liable to prosecution for trespass if they got out.

Goods going beyond the MSJAR were not handled at Oxford Road between March and July 1865 whilst some enlargement (and widening) work was carried out.

The MS&LR pressed ahead with the joint lines to give it direct and independent rail access to Liverpool, but the LNWR blocked any matching improvement to the MSJAR and to Oxford Road, only offering to let these go ahead when the scheme for Manchester Central station was brought forward. To defeat the bill for the scheme, the LNWR then promised to cooperate with the MS&LR in widening the MSJAR and enlarging Oxford Road.

However, Edward Watkin, chairman of the MS&LR, later complained that the LNWR had ensured no improvement took place before the MS&LR had its route to Liverpool. In October 1874, with Liverpool Central railway station now open, a letter to the press complained that with the additional services over the Cheshire Lines now using Oxford Road it was dangerously overcrowded. In the two and a half hours from 8 am, thirty-seven trains were booked to call at Oxford Road: this was far too many considering there was but one platform. Frequently, passengers were compelled to alight outside the station, sometimes on the siding rails, at risk of personal injury, because of "the blocked-up state" of the station. Furthermore, it was rumoured that the LNWR was planning to run a competing service (via Broadheath and Warrington) between Oxford Road and Liverpool Lime Street: if this were true, then it would further worsen the congestion, and the Board of Trade should forbid it.

In 1876, about £12,000 was spent on enlarging the station facilities, including the provision of a refreshment room; the station was then said to be handling about a hundred thousand passengers a week. Train-handling congestion was eased when Manchester Central station came into use, and in 1892 the MSJAR, under pressure to greatly improve Knott Mill, rejected the suggestion of Manchester Corporation that it could kill two birds with one stone by replacing its two existing unsatisfactory stations with a single new, thoroughly satisfactory, station somewhere between them. The MSJAR offered instead a limited reconstruction of the waiting rooms and booking hall; it also rejected the council's offer of assistance with providing a more suitable approach to the station only to accept it two years later.

Press articles on the golden jubilee of the line in 1899 noted that the platform layout was still that of 1849 and somewhat of a museum piece: "if the station were to be designed today... it would have a platform on each side of the main line, an advantage which its frequenters know it does not possess..." and better use would be made of the space currently taken up by the terminal platform, used principally for special trains, mostly those serving Old Trafford during the cricket season.

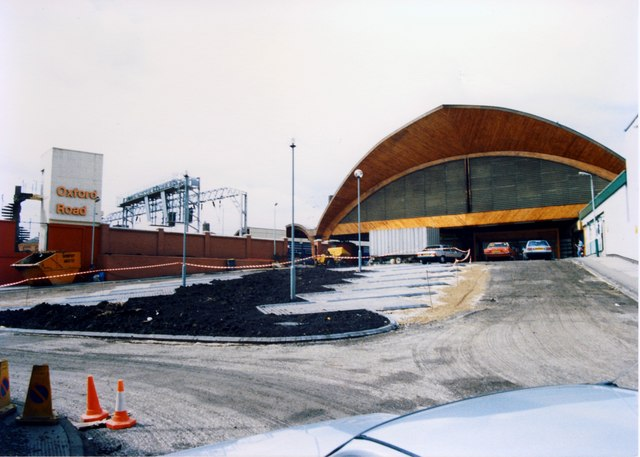
Following the construction of the Windsor Link, the station was refurbished in 1988 to cope with increased patronage

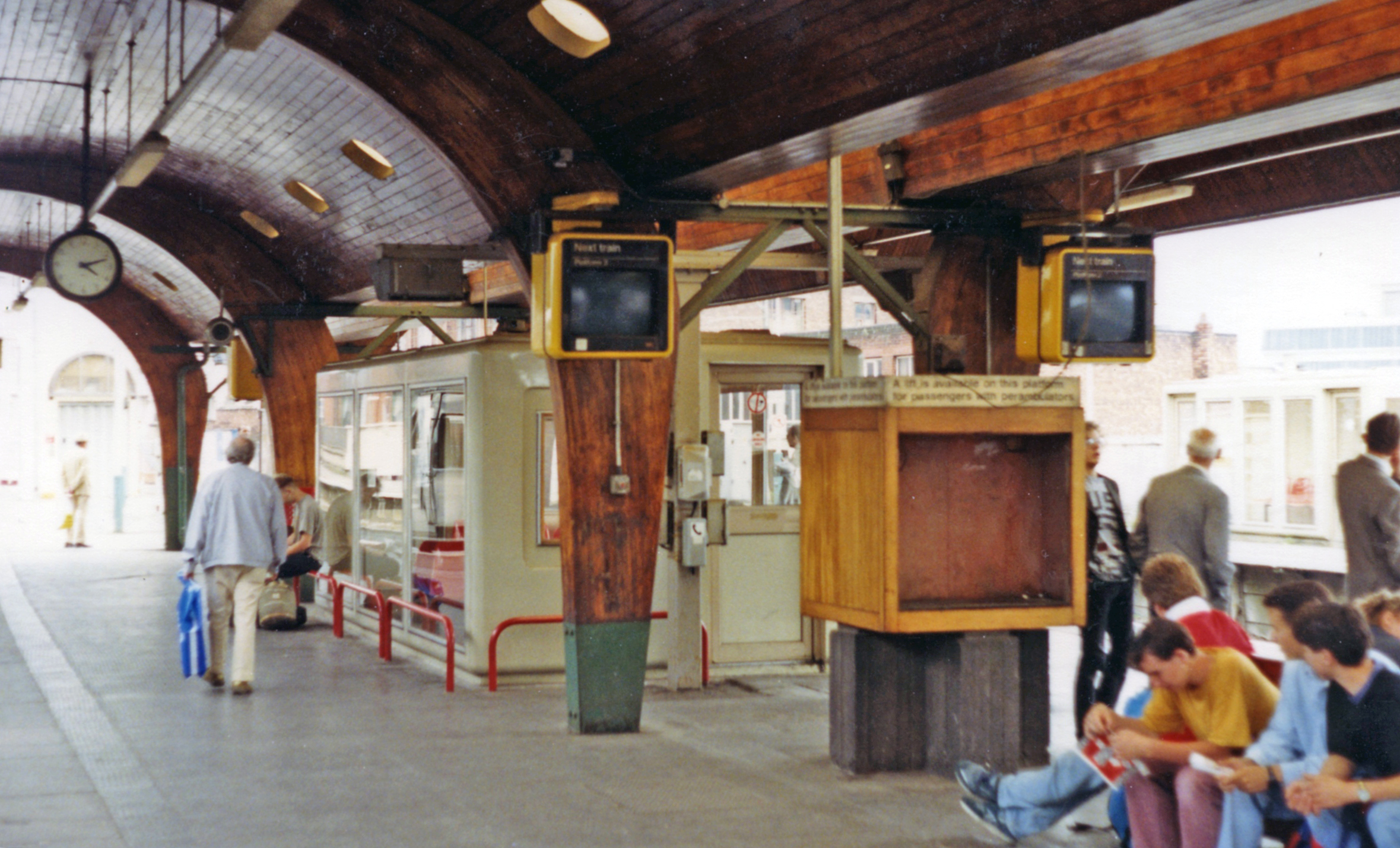
Oxford Road platforms 2 and 3 in 1992

Reconstruction took place during 1903–04. The approach was further improved, the ticket office and the refreshment room were expanded, and the MSJAR offices were removed. They were to have been moved to an adjacent building, but this proved unnecessary: the 78-year-old manager and secretary retired at the end of 1903, and administration of the line was taken over by an LNWR District Superintendent based at Manchester Exchange railway station: An island platform was added on the through lines, coming into use in November 1904.

From 1931, it was served by the MSJAR's 1500 V DC electric trains between Altrincham and Manchester Piccadilly. From July 1959, Altrincham electric trains were cut back from Piccadilly to terminate at Oxford Road in two new bay platforms. The station's other lines were re-electrified at 25 kV AC. The whole station was again rebuilt and reopened on 12 September 1960, to a design by W. R. Headley and Max Clendinning of British Rail's London Midland region, encompassing three overlapping cones for the main structure. The station's location on a viaduct running through the city centre required its load to be lightened, which the architects achieved by using wood for the station structure and platform canopies.

When Manchester Central station closed in 1969, further rebuilding took place: one of the bay platforms was taken out of use and a new through platform provided (platform 1), the others being renumbered accordingly. In 1971, the Altrincham line was re-electrified at 25 kV AC and the 1930s DC trains withdrawn; from then on, local trains from Altrincham ran through to Piccadilly and on to Crewe. Oxford Road thus, once again, became predominantly a through station.

Use of the station increased in 1988 when the Windsor Link between Deansgate and Salford Crescent opened, connecting lines to the north and south of Manchester. This led to further investment in the station, including the installation of computer screens.

In 1992, the Altrincham line stopping service was converted to light rail operation for the Manchester Metrolink. Oxford Road, once served almost entirely by suburban stopping trains, has now returned to having many more longer-distance services.

The station, a Grade II listed structure, requires frequent maintenance. In 2004, the station roof was partially refurbished to prevent leaking. In 2011, the platform shelters, seats and toilets were refurbished at a cost of £500,000. In 2013, the station received a £1.8 million renovation to improve access, including lifts and an emergency exit.

On 10 December 2017, with the opening of the Ordsall Chord, it became possible for trains to run from Manchester Piccadilly to Manchester Victoria. Initially an hourly Northern service operated to the Calder Valley but, from May 2018, the TransPennine Express (TPE) Manchester Airport to Newcastle and Middlesbrough services were rerouted through the station.

=== Future ===
In the Northern Hub plans, the platforms will be extended to allow use by longer trains. The bay platform will be removed to allow the other platforms to be extended. Under controversial plans much of the nearby area's Victorian character will be razed, including the Salisbury pub, and the group of streets nearby known as 'Little Ireland'.

In 2025, Network Rail began consulting on a proposed rationalisation to provide two through platforms accommodating 8-coach trains, with a central west-facing turnback platform replacing the current Platform 5.

== Architecture ==
The station had become dilapidated by the 1950s and, in connection with the electrification and modernisation programme of the Manchester to London Euston line in 1960, the old buildings were replaced by the current structure by architects William Robert Headley and Max Clendinning and structural engineer Hugh Tottenham. It was designed in a distinctive style in concrete and wood with curves bringing to mind the Sydney Opera House.

The station is a grade II listed building. Pevsner calls it "One of the most interesting and innovative buildings of the period ... the most ambitious example in this country of timber conoid shell roofing" (p. 36) and "One of the most remarkable and unusual stations in the country both for the architectural form and the technological interest...it is the most dramatic and it is an important example of the deployment of timber to achieve large roof spans incorporating clerestory lighting."(p. 178)

The choice of timber was forced by the weak viaduct on which the station is situated; anything heavier could have compromised its structural strength. The station has three overlapping conoid structures although they are only viewable from above. The light conoid roofs allow for a column-free interior space, maximising space and reducing load.

Despite its architectural acclaim, the structure began to deteriorate within ten years. The roof started to leak and for years the station's platform buildings were encased in scaffolding and other metalwork, partly to support the structure and prevent material falling on the platforms and passengers. Partial remedial refurbishment was completed in 2004.

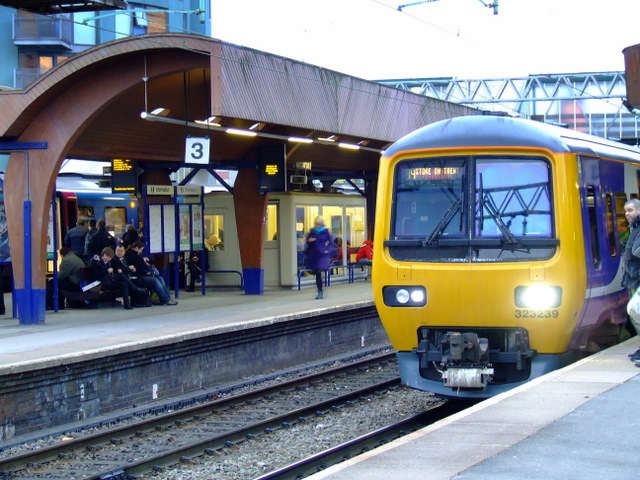
A Class 323 and the distinctive canopies

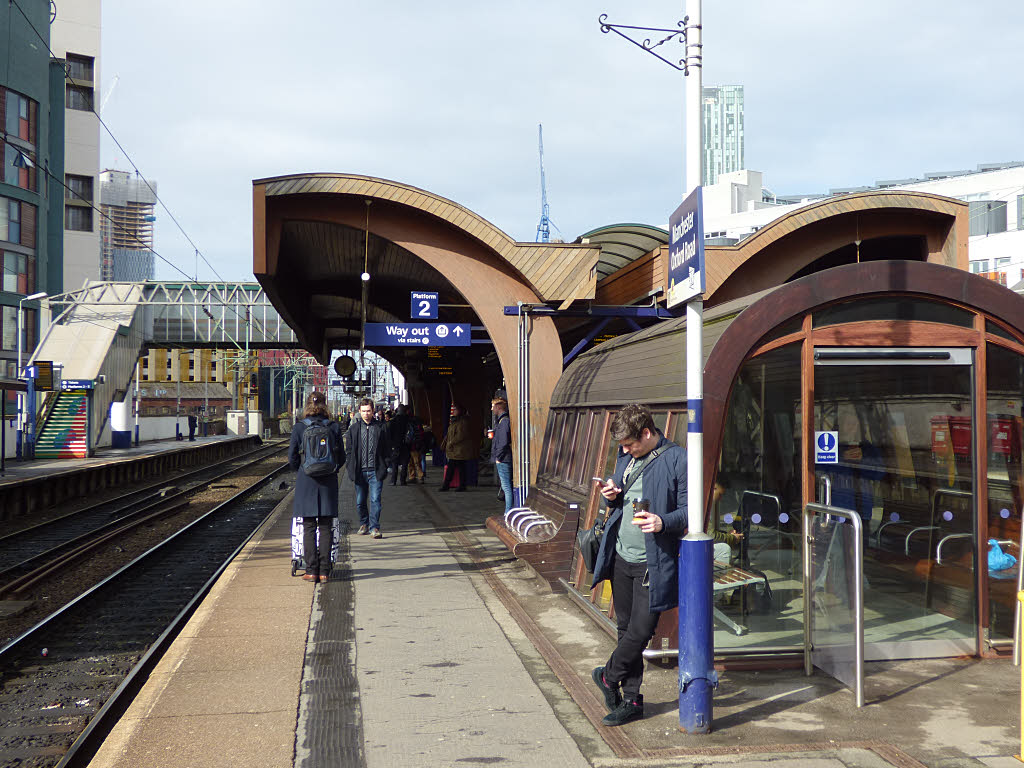
Platform 2

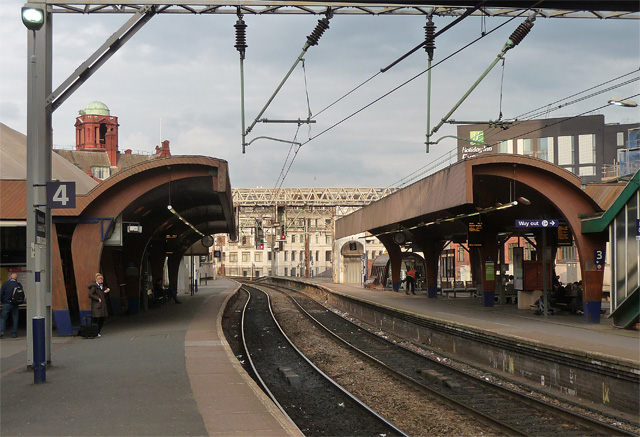
Platform 4

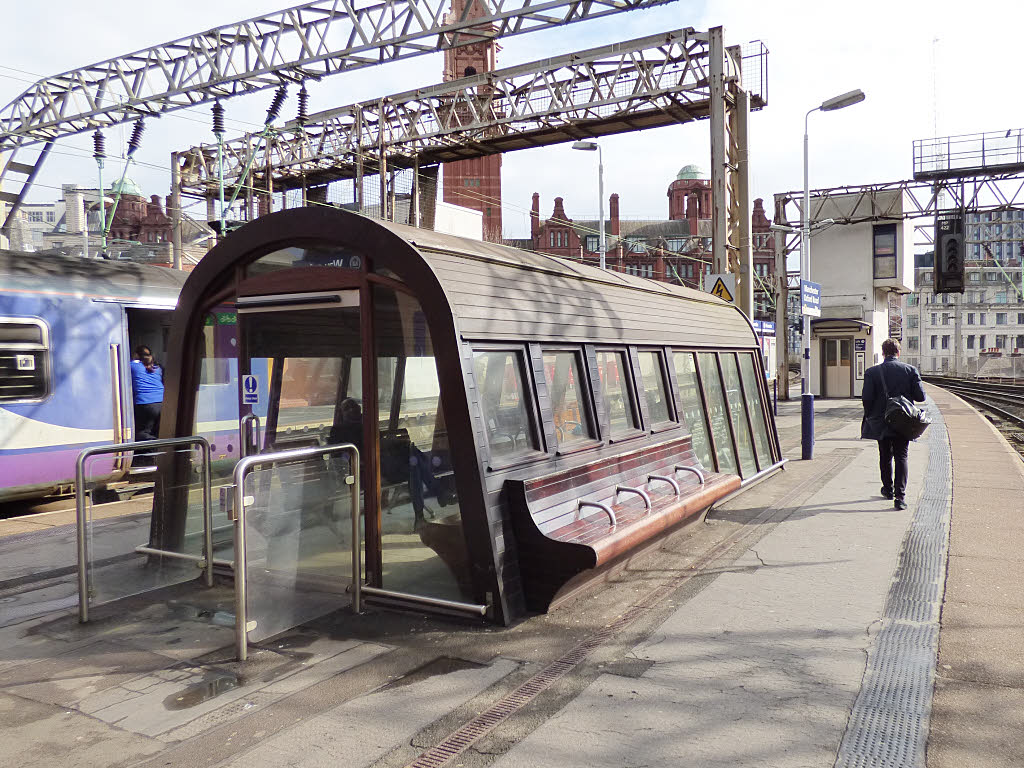
Waiting shelter

== Services ==
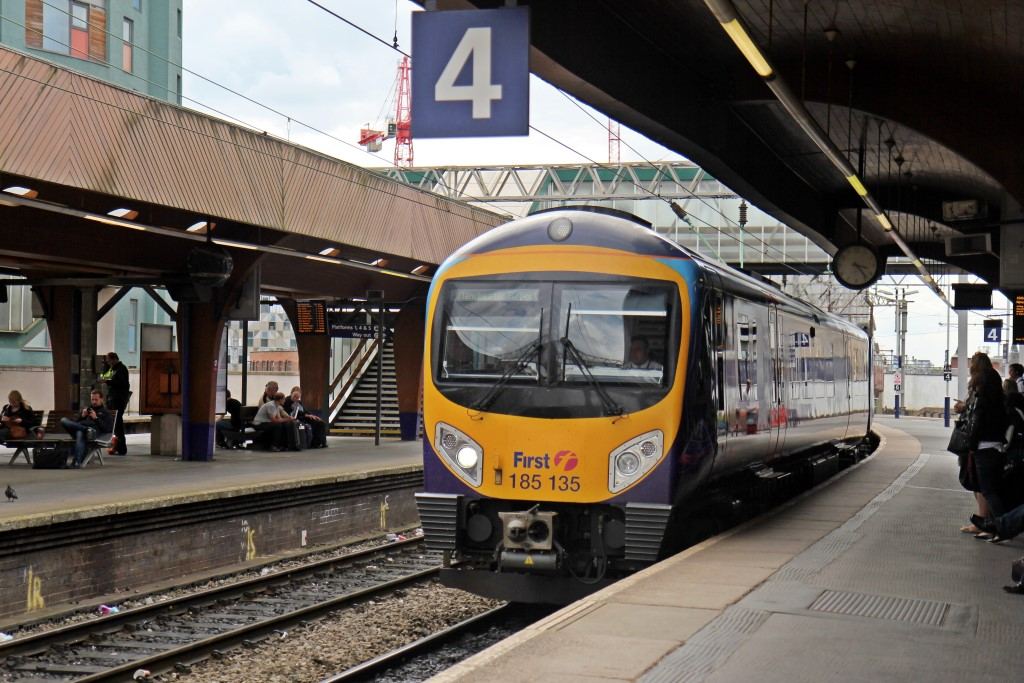
A First TransPennine Express Class 185 Desiro at platform 4, with a service to Manchester Airport

The station is served by four train operating companies:

- Northern Trains
  - 1tph to Southport, via Bolton
  - 2tph to Blackpool North via Bolton
  - 1tph to Liverpool Lime Street via Newton-le-Willows
  - 1tph to Liverpool Lime Street, via Warrington Central (stopping service)
  - 11tpd to Barrow-in-Furness
  - 4tpd to Windermere
  - 4tph to Manchester Airport
- TransPennine Express
  - 1tph to Redcar Central
  - 1tph to Cleethorpes
  - 1tph to Liverpool Lime Street, via Warrington Central (semi-fast)
  - 2tph to Manchester Airport
  - 1tp2h to Glasgow Central
  - 1tp2h to Edinburgh Waverley
- Transport for Wales
  - 1tph to Llandudno or Holyhead (2 trains per day, weekdays only; 1 to Bangor on Saturdays only), via Chester (some services terminate at Chester)
  - 1tph to Manchester Airport
- East Midlands Railway
  - 1tph to Liverpool Lime Street via Warrington Central (fast)
  - 1tph to Norwich via Nottingham

Services are reduced on Sundays, with most routes operating hourly. All trains departing eastbound from the station (those to Norwich, Cleethorpes and Manchester Airport) also call at Manchester Piccadilly.

Preceding station	National Rail	Following station
Newton-le-Willows	Transport for Wales Rail Manchester to North Wales	Manchester Piccadilly
Warrington Central	East Midlands Railway Liverpool to Norwich	Manchester Piccadilly
Manchester Victoria	TransPennine Express North TransPennine	Manchester Piccadilly
Urmston	TransPennine Express South TransPennine	Manchester Piccadilly
Birchwood	TransPennine Express South TransPennine	Manchester Piccadilly
Bolton	TransPennine Express Anglo-Scottish Route	Manchester Piccadilly
Deansgate	Northern Trains Blackpool North to Manchester Airport	Manchester Piccadilly
Deansgate	Northern Trains Liverpool Lime Street to Manchester Airport	Manchester Piccadilly
Deansgate	Northern Trains Barrow-in-Furness/Windermere to Manchester Airport	Manchester Piccadilly
Deansgate	Northern Trains Manchester to Southport	Terminus
Deansgate	Northern Trains Liverpool to Manchester via Warrington	Terminus
	Disused railways	
Old Trafford; 1969–89; Line closed, station open	BR (London Midland Region); Mid-Cheshire Line	Terminus

== See also ==
- Listed buildings in Manchester-M1
